= Mustardé technique =

- Specialty: Plastic and reconstructive surgery; otorhinolaryngology

The Mustardé technique is an otoplastic surgery (otoplasty) for pinning protruding ears. The method belongs together with the Stenström and Converse methods to the traditional otoplasties. It is antihelix plastic surgery performed with the suturing technique.

== History ==
The technique of this surgery was first described by Mustardé in 1960. Further publications by him appeared in 1963 and 1967.

== Surgical procedure ==
The Mustardé technique involves making a long incision on the back of the ear and removing a strip of skin. The skin is dissected from the cartilage between he edge of the ear (helix) and the place where the ear is attached to the head (sulcus posterior), thus exposing the cartilage on the back of the ear. It is therefore assigned to the open ear pinning methods. The antihelix fold is bent more strongly or formed anew with mattress sutures that are anchored in the cartilage. The cartilage is left completely intact, that is, it is not scored, cut or excised as in the ear pinning technique of Stenström, Converse and versions deriving from these. The skin is then closed with sutures and sometimes a drainage tube is inserted for 1 to 2 days. A head bandage is applied for 1 or 2 weeks, or longer in exceptional cases. The Mustardé ear pinning surgery is, according to the opinion of Weerda not suitable for all ears.

A similar method, by which the cartilage is left intact, is the so-called Stitch method. But the ear is not cut open with the stitch method, which is why it belongs to the closed and minimally invasive otoplasties.

== Complications ==
Bleeding, ear lying too close to the head, stronger asymmetry of the ear distances, hypertrophic scar, keloid, pressure damage (necrosis) caused by the bandage, recurrence.
