= EarFold =

EarFold or EarFold method is a surgical method for pinning protruding ears. In contrast to all the other ear-pinning procedures (otoplasty), metal implants are used instead of sutures. As far as the invasiveness of the surgery is concerned, the Earfold method ranks between the open, invasive conventional ear-pinning procedures (6, 7, 8, 9), and the closed, minimally invasive stitch method (4, 5) or other variations of minimally invasive procedures (10, 11, 12, 13, 14, 15, 16, 17, 18). The ears are cut open and the skin is detached from the cartilage as in conventional ear-pinning operations, but to a lesser extent. Occasionally, the cartilage under the detached skin is also scored or perforated with a needle to weaken it.

== History ==
The Earfold technique was first described by Norbert V. Kang and Ryan L. Kerstein in 2016 (1). Kang and his colleagues reported on the results and possible complications of the method in 2018 (2).

== Surgical procedure ==
One or several incisions of approximately 1 cm in length are made in the skin on the front of the ear, depending on the number of metal implants to be inserted in the ear. Starting here, the skin on the front of the ear is raised from the cartilage to create pockets in which the metal implants are inserted with the aid of an Earfold introducer 3).

The metal implants are called Earfolds. They are 5x15 mm large and 0.15 mm thick. They are made of Nitinol, an alloy of titanium and nickel, and have a 24-carat gold plating. On the side facing the cartilage, the implants have short, triangular, thornlike tips that penetrate the cartilage and thus fix the implant in place after several weeks. Because of their U-shape, the implants reshape a poorly developed antihelix or create a new one if it is non-existent, thereby moving the ear towards the head. The ear cartilage lying beneath the implants is either left intact or is scored or perforated with a needle - the latter is done to weaken it. The patient is allowed to check the new position of his ears in a mirror before the operation by having a Prefold positioner, of the same size, shape and tension as the implant, placed temporarily on the antihelix fold. The extent of the ear pinning is determined by the curvature of the Earfolds and their position along the antihelix. The resulting new head-to-ear distance doesn’t always meet the individual expectations of the patient because it is determined by the constant, preset curvature of the implant. The incisions in the skin are sewn up and covered with a strip of plaster. The method is not suitable for all patients. If their ears have a large, deep Cavum conchae, which in combination with a poorly formed antihelix is often the cause of a protruding ear, ear pinning in the lower half of the ear is not possible or the ear-pinning result is unsatisfactory. Protruding earlobes can’t be pinned. In comparison to the conventional ear-pinning operations (see traditional ear surgery and otoplasty) and the Stitch method, there are no publications available on long-term results. The authors of the Earfold method point out that late complications, such as relapse, secondary deformations, defects, shifts in position or rejection of the implants, could only be assessed to a limited degree due to the short follow-up time of the patients in the study carried out (1, 2).

== Post-operative treatment ==
The patients should not sleep on their ears for the first 4 weeks, so that the metal implants are not shifted out of place. One may not smoke for 3 months, so that there are no circulatory disturbances leading to skin erosion of the very thin skin over the implant. Earrings should not be worn for 2 weeks. One should not swim during the first 4 weeks.

== Risks and complications ==
They are comparable to the methods of the traditional otoplasty: irregularities; undesired results; top of ear is pointed (the so-called Spock ear); post-operative bleeding with haematoma in the pockets of the skin; pain; infection; erosion of the skin; allergic reaction to the implants; rejection of the implants; hypertrophic scars; keloid on the skin incisions; cosmetically disfiguring edge formations on the front of the ear when the implants turn; asymmetry in the position of the ears; shifting of the implants in the first weeks when lying on the ears; visibility of the implants under the skin; removal of the implants more complex and difficult than removing sutures with other surgical methods.
