= Stenström technique =

- Specialty: Otorhinolaryngology

The Stenström technique or method is otoplastic surgery (otoplasty) for pinning protruding ears. The method belongs together with the Mustardé technique and the Converse technique to the traditional or conventional otoplasties.

== History ==
The technique of this surgery was described by Stenström in 1963 and was slightly altered by him in 1973.

== Surgical method ==
This is a plastic surgery of the antihelix that is carried out with the scratch or scoring technique. Underlying this method is the evidence that the cartilage bends itself convexly to the opposite side after scratching or scoring.

A long incision is made on the back of the ear and a strip of skin is removed. Through an incision in the cartilage in the cauda helicis (lower end of the ear cartilage) or in the scapha the skin, together with the perichondrium is raised on the anterior surface of the antihelix. A rasp is inserted in the resulting skin-perichondrium tunnel to blindly score or scratch the cartilage of the anterior (front side) of the antihelix. The skin wound on the back of the ear is sutured and finally a bandage is applied for 1 or 2 weeks, or longer in exceptional cases. The hollows of the ear on the front (anterior) side of the ear (cavum conchae, scapha) are modelled with ointment-containing swabs for several days and supported this way. According to the opinion of Weerda this method is not suitable for older patients due to the limited elasticity of the cartilage.

== Complications ==
According to Weerda: cosmetically disfiguring cartilage edges along the anterior surface of the antihelix if the cartilage is scratched or scored too deeply or is injured; post-operative bleeding; haematoma; relapse (ears protrude again); too closely pinned ear; hypertrophic scar; keloid; hypersensitivity; pressure damage (necrosis) if hard bandages are applied too tightly; perichondritis (inflammation of the cartilage); stronger asymmetry of the ears.
