= Cropping (animal) =

Removal of portions of an animal's ears

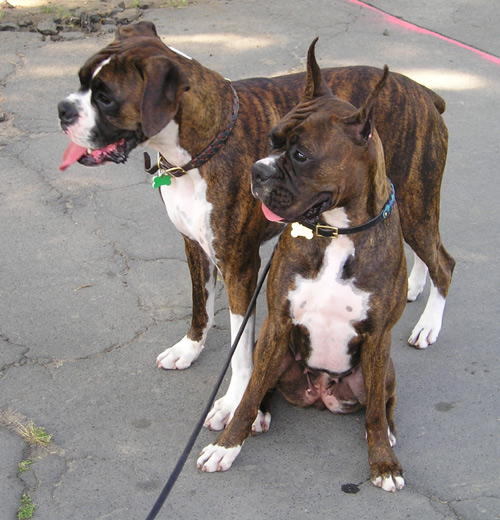
Boxers, showing natural and cropped ears

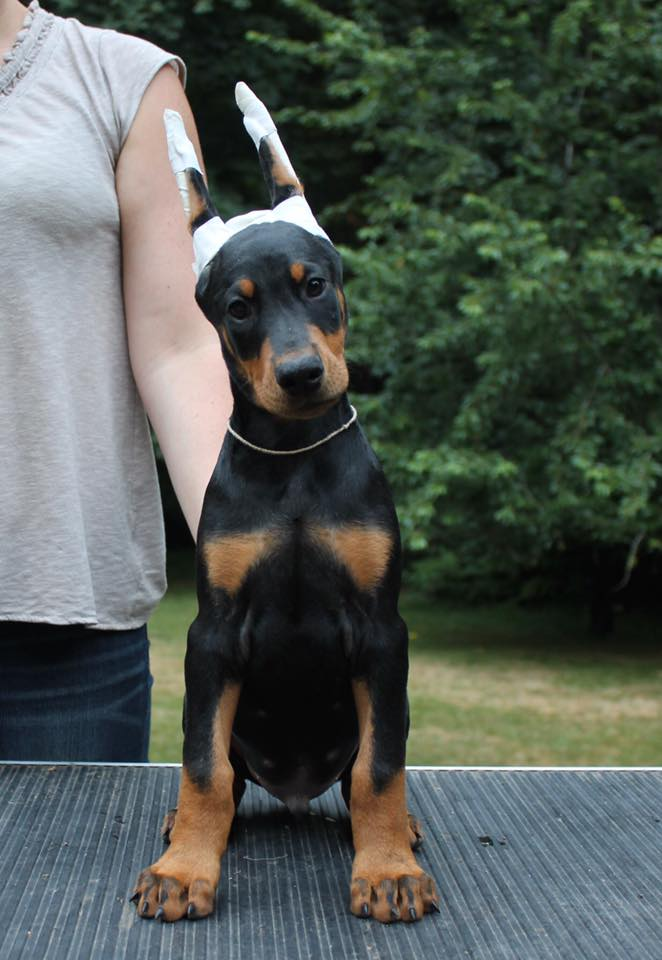
A Doberman Pinscher puppy with its ears taped to train them into the desired shape and carriage after cropping

Cropping is the removal of part or all of the external flaps of an animal's ear. The procedure sometimes involves bracing and taping the remainder of the ears to train them to point upright. Almost exclusively performed on dogs, it is an old practice that was once done for perceived health, practical or cosmetic reasons. Veterinary science states there is no medical or physical advantage to the animal from the procedure, leading to concerns of animal cruelty over performing unnecessary surgery on animals. In modern times, cropping is banned in many nations, but is still legal in a limited number of countries. Where permitted, it is seen only in certain breeds of dog, such as pit bull and bull terrier type breeds, the Doberman Pinscher, Schnauzer, Great Dane, Boxer and Cane Corso.

== History and purposes ==
Historically, cropping was performed on working dogs as it was believed it would decrease the risk of health complications, such as ear infections or hematomas. Crops were also performed on dogs that might need to fight, either while hunting animals that might fight back or while defending livestock herds from predators, or because they were used for pit-fighting sports such as dog fighting or bear-baiting.

=== Early history ===
Roman practices were to crop dogs' ears to avoid damage and injury in fighting and hunting, with tail docking practiced to avoid the transmission of rabies.

=== Guardian breeds ===
Cropping the ears of livestock guardian dogs was, and may still be, traditional in some pastoral cultures. The ears of these guardian dogs—such as the Caucasian Shepherd Dog and the Maremmano-Abruzzese Sheepdog—were traditionally cropped to reduce the possibility of wolves or opponent-dogs getting a grip on them.

According to one description, cropping was carried out when puppies were weaned, at about six weeks. It was performed by an older or expert shepherd, using the ordinary blade shears used for shearing, well sharpened. The ears were cut either to a point like those of a fox, or rounded like those of a bear. The removed auricles were first grilled, then given to the puppy to eat, in the belief that it would make him more "sour". An alternative method was to remove the ears from newborn puppies by twisting them off; however, this left almost no external ear on the dog. Both ear-cropping and the use of spiked collars were described more than three hundred years ago, as a defense against wolves.

=== Fighting ===
Similar to guardian breeds, in sport fighting, cropping is used to minimize the risk of ears being bitten and held. The ears were an easy target for an opposing animal to grab or tear. Dogs may have their ears cropped, legally or not, for participation in dogfights, themselves illegal in many jurisdictions.

=== Modern practices ===
In 2000, veterinarian Bruce Fogle wrote:

[D]ogs have their ears partly amputated—'cropped' is the benign word people like to use—for no other reason than to make them look fierce. This is primarily a German tradition, born out of the military origins and uses of breeds like Great Danes, Boxers, Doberman Pinschers, and Schnauzers. This mutilation—I am sorry to be so blunt, but that is what cropping is—is banned in its country of origin, and in most other FCI countries. North America remains the only significant region in the world where ear and tail amputations are still routinely performed. There is no medical or work-related justification for these procedures to be performed on pet dogs. Many dedicated, dog-loving veterinarians will no longer carry out these alterations.

== The procedure ==
The veterinary procedure is known as "cosmetic otoplasty", and involves the removal of a portion of the pinnae, the external flap of the ear. Cropping is usually performed on puppies at 7 to 12 weeks of age. After 16 weeks, the procedure is more painful and the animal has greater pain memory. Usually up to 2/3 of the ear flap is removed in a cropping operation, and the wound edges are closed with stitches. The ears are then bandaged. Long crops are taped until they heal into the proper shape. The procedure is recommended to be undertaken under general anaesthesia; opponents' primary concerns revolve around post-operative pain.

American veterinary schools do not generally teach cropping (or docking), and thus veterinarians who perform the practice have to learn on the job. There are also problems with amateurs performing ear-cropping, particularly at puppy mills.

In the last 100 years or so, ear cropping has been performed more often for cosmetic purposes. In nations and states where it remains legal, it is usually practiced because it is required as part of a breed standard for exhibition at dog shows. In the US, although tail-docking, dewclaw removal, and neutering procedures remain common, ear-cropping is declining, except within the dog show industry. Some show ring competitors state they would discontinue the practice altogether if they could still "win in the ring."

=== Examples of cropping styles ===
Examples of cropping styles
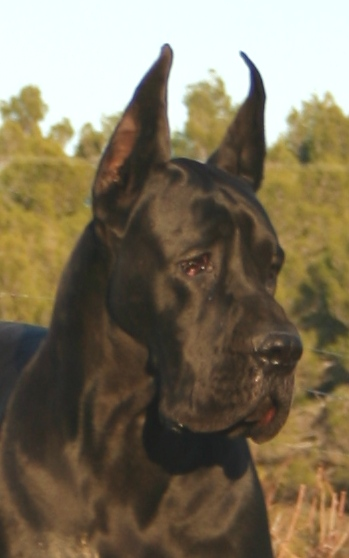
Long ear crop on a Great Dane

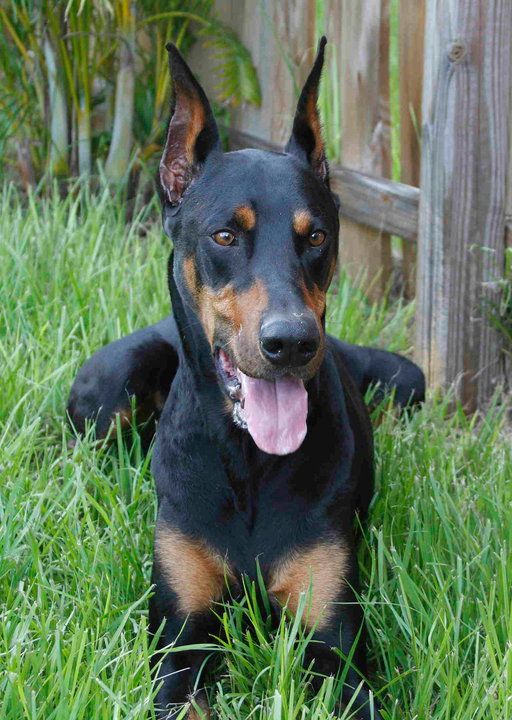
Long ear crop on a Doberman

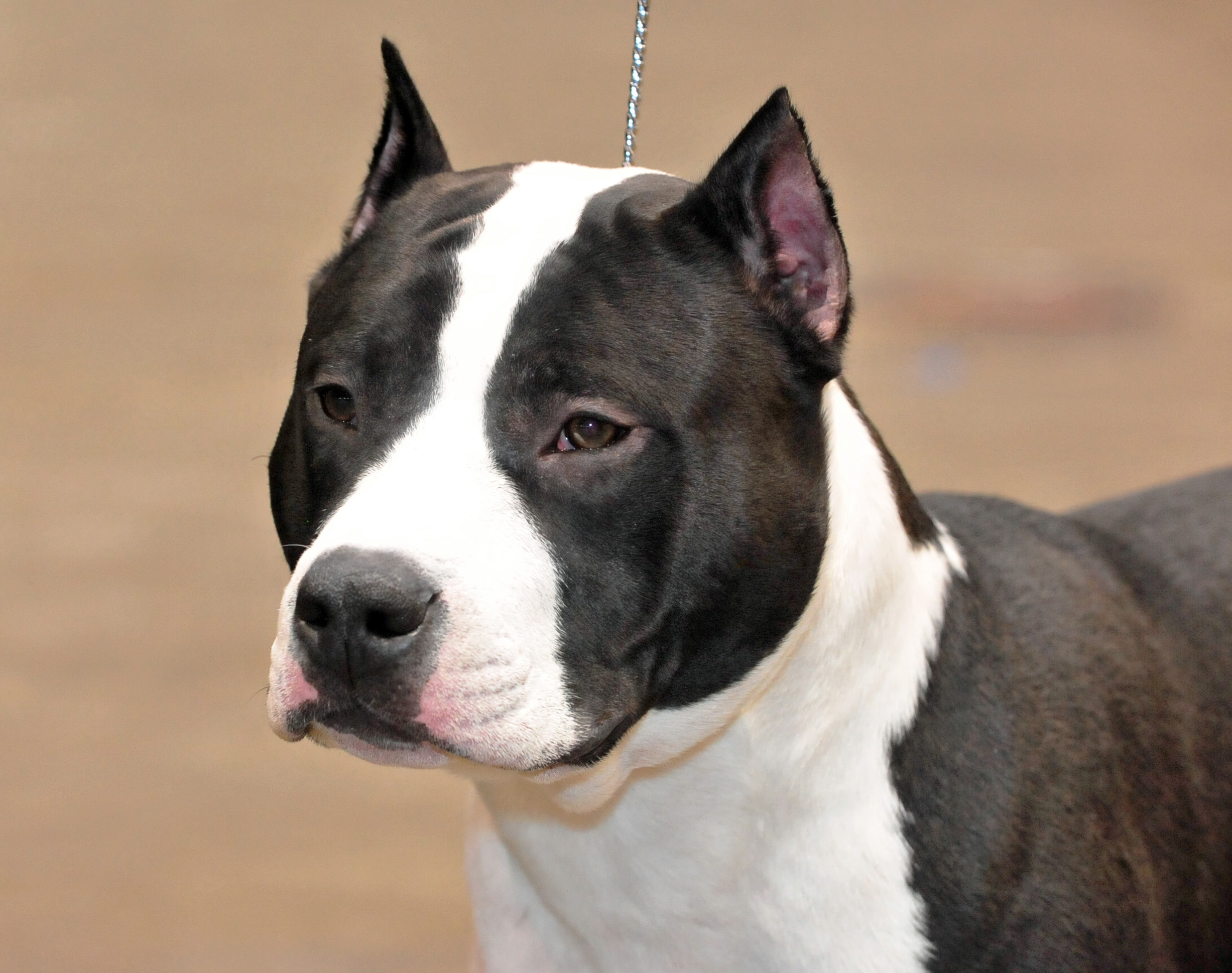
Medium crop on an American Staffordshire Terrier

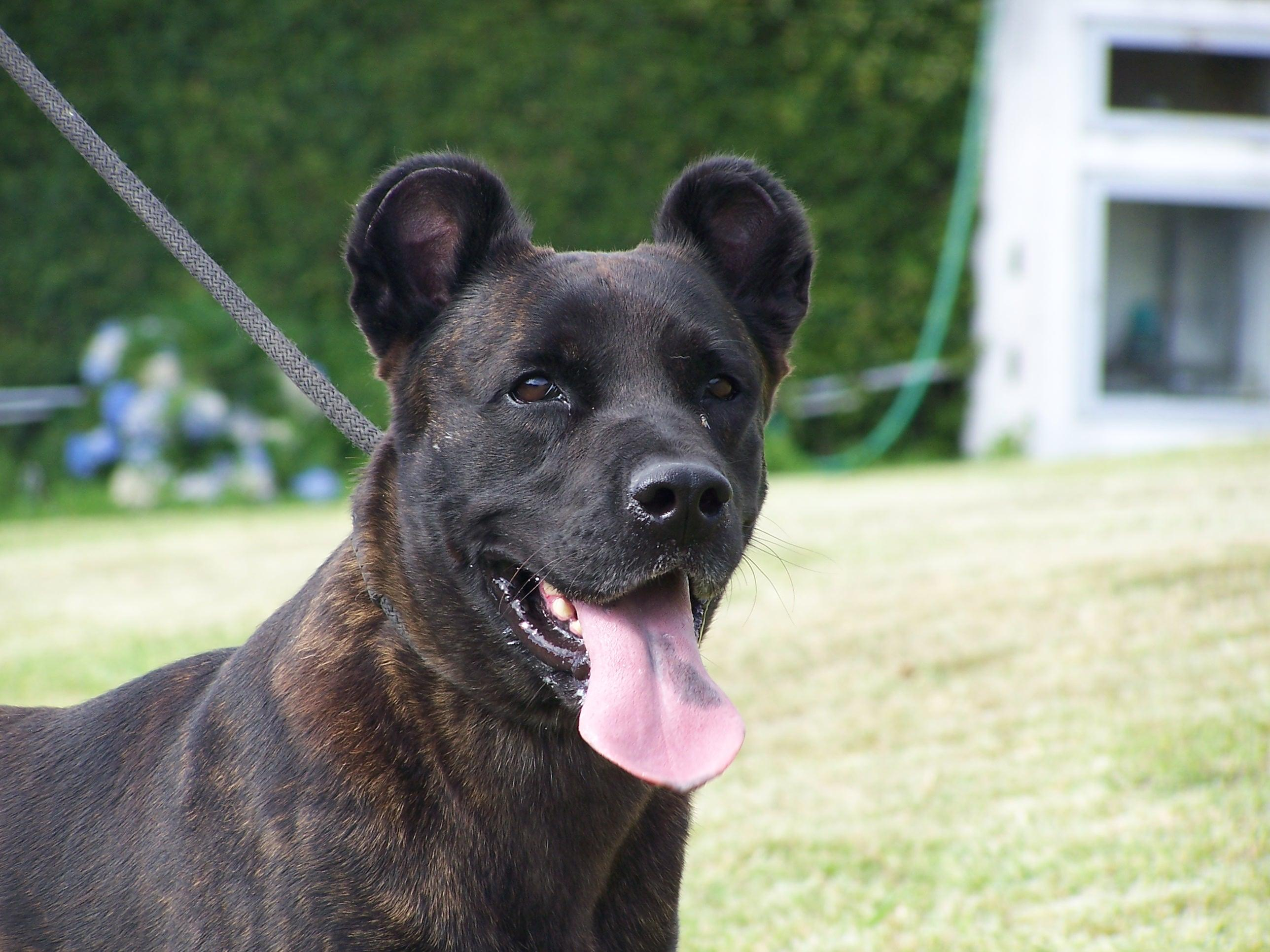
Rounded crop on a Saint Miguel Cattle Dog

== Animal welfare and law ==
The practice is illegal across most of Europe, including all countries that have ratified the European Convention for the Protection of Pet Animals, and most member countries of the Fédération Cynologique Internationale. It is illegal in regions of Spain and in some Canadian provinces.

Ear-cropping is still widely practiced in the United States and parts of Canada, with approximately 130,000 puppies in the United States thought to have their ears cropped each year. The American Kennel Club (AKC) and Canadian Kennel Club both permit the practice. The AKC position is that ear cropping and tail docking are "acceptable practices integral to defining and preserving breed character and/or enhancing good health." While some individual states have attempted to ban ear-cropping, there is strong opposition from some dog breed organizations, who cite health concerns and tradition.

The American Veterinary Medical Association "opposes ear cropping and tail docking of dogs when done solely for cosmetic purposes" and "encourages the elimination of ear cropping and tail docking from breed standards".

In 2009, veterinary chain Banfield Pet Hospital announced they would no longer do tail docking, ear cropping or devocalization on dogs.

It has been suggested the cropping may interfere with a dog's ability to communicate using ear signals, however there has been no scientific comparative study of ear communication in cropped and uncropped dogs.

=== Legal status by country ===
Country	Status	Ban/restriction date (if applicable)
Australia	Banned	
Austria	Banned	1 January 2005
Belgium	Banned	1 January 2006
Bosnia and Herzegovina	Banned	
Brazil	Banned for cosmetic purposes	
Bulgaria	Banned	1 February 2005
Canada	Canada has no federal law banning pet cosmetic surgery. The Canadian Veterinary Medical Association opposes all cosmetic alterations. Two provinces have provincial legislation prohibiting ear cropping, tail docking, and most cosmetic surgeries: Prince Edward Island (☨1) and Newfoundland and Labrador (☨2). Three provinces' veterinary associations ban all veterinarians from performing cosmetic surgeries on pets: New Brunswick (☨3), Nova Scotia (☨4), and Quebec (☨5) Three provincial veterinary associations have bans on ear cropping alone: Manitoba (☨6), British Columbia (☨7), and Saskatchewan (☨8).	☨1: 10 July 2015 ☨2: 1978 ☨3: 15 October 2008 ☨4: 1 April 2010 ☨5: 1 January 2017 ☨6: 3 February 2012 ☨7: 2015 ☨8: 2013
Colombia	Banned	
Croatia	Banned	2007
Cyprus	Banned	1993
Czech Republic	Banned	1 April 1999
Denmark	Banned	1 June 1996
England and Wales	Banned	1899
Estonia	Banned	2001
Finland	Banned	15 February 1971
France	Banned	1 January 2010
Germany	Banned	1 May 1992
Guatemala	Banned for cosmetic purposes	2017
Greece	Banned	27 February 1992
Hungary	Banned	
Iceland	Banned	2001
India	Previously restricted, currently unrestricted	
Ireland	Banned	
Israel	Banned	2000
Italy	Banned	1 November 2011
Latvia	Banned	
Lithuania	Banned	
Luxembourg	Banned	1 May 1992
Netherlands	Banned	1 September 2001
New Zealand	Banned	2004
Northern Ireland	Banned	2011
Norway	Banned	1954
Poland	Banned	1997
Portugal	Banned	1 January 1994
Romania	Banned	2008
Russia	Restricted	
Scotland	Banned	1899
Serbia	Banned	2019
Slovakia	Banned	1 January 2003
Slovenia	Banned	April 2007
South Africa	Banned	June 2008
Spain	Banned in autonomies of Catalonia and Andalucia	
Sweden	Banned	1989
Switzerland	Banned	1997
Turkey	Banned	2004
United States	Unrestricted (Note: Some states, including New York and Vermont, have considered bills to make the practice illegal)	2003
Virgin Islands	Banned	2005

== Non-canine animals ==
Cropping of large portions of the pinnae of other animals is rare, although the clipping of identifying shapes in the pinnae of livestock, called earmarks, was common prior to the introduction of compulsory ear tags. Removal of portions of the ear of laboratory mice or neutered feral cats for identification, i.e. ear-notching or ear-tipping, is still used. The practice of cropping for cosmetic purposes is rare in non-canines, although some selectively bred animals have naturally small ears which can be mistaken for cropping. (Note: Some animals, such as the Lamancha goat, have ears which are naturally small as the result of selective breeding, and some people mistakenly believe their ears to be cropped. In other animals, small ears may result from a genetic mutation or the emergence of a genetically recessive trait, such as in Highland cattle, where the appearance of small ears, appearing to have their pinnae cropped, is viewed as a defect.)

== See also ==
- Docking (dog tails)
- Ear shaping (human ears)
- Overview of discretionary invasive procedures on animals
