= Converse technique =

Surgical method

- Specialty: Otolaryngologist

The Converse technique, together with the Mustardé technique and Stenström technique, belongs to the standard methods of traditional otoplasty. Numerous variations for pinning ears have been derived from them.

== History ==
Converse described his method in 1955 and 1963.

== Surgical procedure ==
This antihelix plastic surgery is performed with the incision-suture technique. A long incision is made on the back of the ear and a strip of skin is removed. The cartilage is completely cut through in several places. With thick cartilage, the back of the antihelix is made thinner by using a scalpel to remove cartilage. If the cavum conchae (hollow before the ear canal entrance) is large, it is made smaller by additionally removing a crescent-shaped piece of cartilage from the concha. Or a so-called conchal rotation is performed by first removing muscle and connective tissue from the sulcus posterior (region where the ear is attached to the head), and then the ear is turned towards the head with sutures running between the pericranium and the cartilage of the concha, thus reducing its distance to the head. Using several mattress sutures that are anchored in the cartilage, a new antihelix fold is formed, or a weakly developed antihelix fold is bent more strongly. After the insertion of a drainage tube for 1 or 2 days, the skin wound on the back of the ear is sutured. Occasionally the newly formed antihelix is additionally fixed with outer mattress sutures that are made over small swabs so that they don’t cut into the skin. Dressing is usually applied for 1 or 2 weeks.

== Complications ==
According to Weerda, the possibilities are: deformation of the ear leading to deformation at all levels through the destruction of cartilage (so-called “catastrophe ear” after Staindl)[4]; ear lying too close to the head; telephone ear and the reverse of the telephone ear; visible, cosmetically disfiguring cartilage edges and skin retractions along the front surface of the antihelix and in the cavum conchae; infection with abscess or inflammation of the cartilage (perichondritis); fistula of the suture; suture rejection; granuloma; atheroma; bleeding; haematoma; relapse (ears protrude again); hypertrophic scarring or keloids along the skin incision; hypersensitivity and pain with pressure and cold; tissue destruction (necrosis) through pressure from too closely fitting, hard bandages; constriction of the ear canal entrance; stronger asymmetry of the ear distances.
