= Otoplasty =

Surgery to correct the deformities and defects of the auricle

Otoplasty, from Ancient Greek οὖς (oûs), meaning "ear", and πλαστός (plastós), meaning "moulded", is a procedure for correcting the deformities and defects of the auricle (external ear), whether these defects are congenital conditions (e.g. microtia, anotia, etc.) or caused by trauma. Otoplastic surgeons may reshape, move, or augment the cartilaginous support framework of the auricle to correct these defects.

Congenital ear deformities occasionally overlap with other medical conditions (e.g. Treacher Collins syndrome and hemifacial microsomia).

== History ==
=== Antiquity ===
Otoplasty (surgery of the ear) was developed in ancient India and is described in the medical compendium, the Sushruta Samhita (Sushruta's Compendium, c. 500 AD). The book discussed otoplastic and other plastic surgery techniques and procedures for correcting, repairing and reconstructing ears, noses, lips, and genitalia that were amputated as criminal, religious, and military punishments. The ancient Indian medical knowledge and plastic surgery techniques of the Sushruta Samhita were practiced throughout Asia until the late 18th century; the October 1794 issue of the contemporary British Gentleman's Magazine reported the practice of rhinoplasty, as described in the Sushruta Samhita. Moreover, two centuries later, contemporary practices of otoplastic praxis were derived from the techniques and procedures developed and established in antiquity by Sushruta.

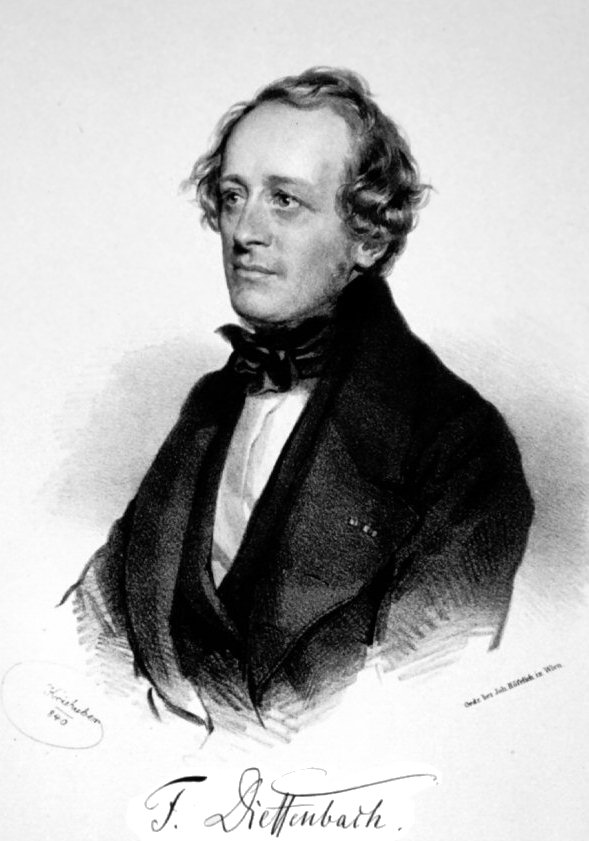
The German polymath Johann Friedrich Dieffenbach was a pioneer in the fields of plastic surgery. (c. 1840)

=== 19th century ===
In Die operative Chirurgie (Operational Surgery, 1845), Johann Friedrich Dieffenbach (1794–1847) reported the first surgical approach for the correction of prominent ears — a combination otoplasty procedure that featured the simple excision (cutting) of the problematic excess cartilage from the posterior sulcus (back groove) of the ear, and the subsequent affixing, with sutures, of the corrected auricle to the mastoid periosteum, the membrane covering the mastoid process at the underside of the mastoid portion of the temporal bone, at the back of the head.

=== 20th and 21st centuries ===
In 1920, Harold D. Gillies (1882–1960) first reproduced the auricle by burying an external-ear support framework, made of autologous rib cartilage, under the skin of the mastoid region of the head, which reconstructed the auricle; he then separated this from the skin of the mastoid area by means of a cervical flap. In 1937, Dr. Gillies also attempted a similar pediatric ear reconstruction with an auricle support framework fabricated from maternal cartilage. This otoplasty correction technique proved inadequate, due to the problems inherent to the biochemical breakdown and elimination (resorption) of the cartilage tissue by the patient's body.

In 1964, Radford C. Tanzer (1921–2004) re-emphasized the use of autologous cartilage as the most advantageously reliable organic material for resolving microtia (abnormally small ears), because of its great histologic viability, resistance to shrinkage, and resistance to softening, and lower incidence of resorption.

The development of plastic surgery procedures, such as the refinement of J.F. Dieffenbach's ear surgery techniques, has established more than 170 otoplasty procedures for correcting prominent ears, and for correcting defects and deformities of the auricle; as such, otoplasty corrections are in three surgical-technique groups:

- Group I - Techniques that leave intact the cartilage support-framework of the ear, and reconfigure the distance and the angle of projection of the auricle from the head, solely by means of sutures, as in the permanent suture-insertion of the Mustardé technique the Merck stitch method and the incisionless Fritsch otoplasty for creating an anti helical fold:
  - Mustardé technique: An open invasive method, whereby the retroauricular cartilage is extensively exposed, a part of the skin is excised, and mattress sutures are inserted.
  - Merck stitch method: a minimally invasive method, by which the ear is no longer cut open and the cartilage is left completely intact. The mattress sutures are inserted in the ear through 2 to 3 small stab incisions on the back of the ear.
  - Incisionless Fritsch otoplasty: It is a combination of the minimally invasive technique and the Stenström technique, whereby the cartilage on the front of the ear is scored with superficial incisions.
- Group II — Techniques that resect (cut and remove) the pertinent excess cartilage from the support-framework of the auricle, which then render it pliable to being re-molded, reconfigured, and affixed to the head at the projection distance-and-angle characteristic of a normal ear; the relevant procedures are the cartilage-incision Converse technique and the Chongchet–Stenström technique for the anterior-correction of prominent ears.
- Group III — Techniques that combine the excision of cartilage portions from the support framework of the auricle, in order to reduce the degree of projection and the distance of the external ear from the head.

== Surgical anatomy of the external ear ==
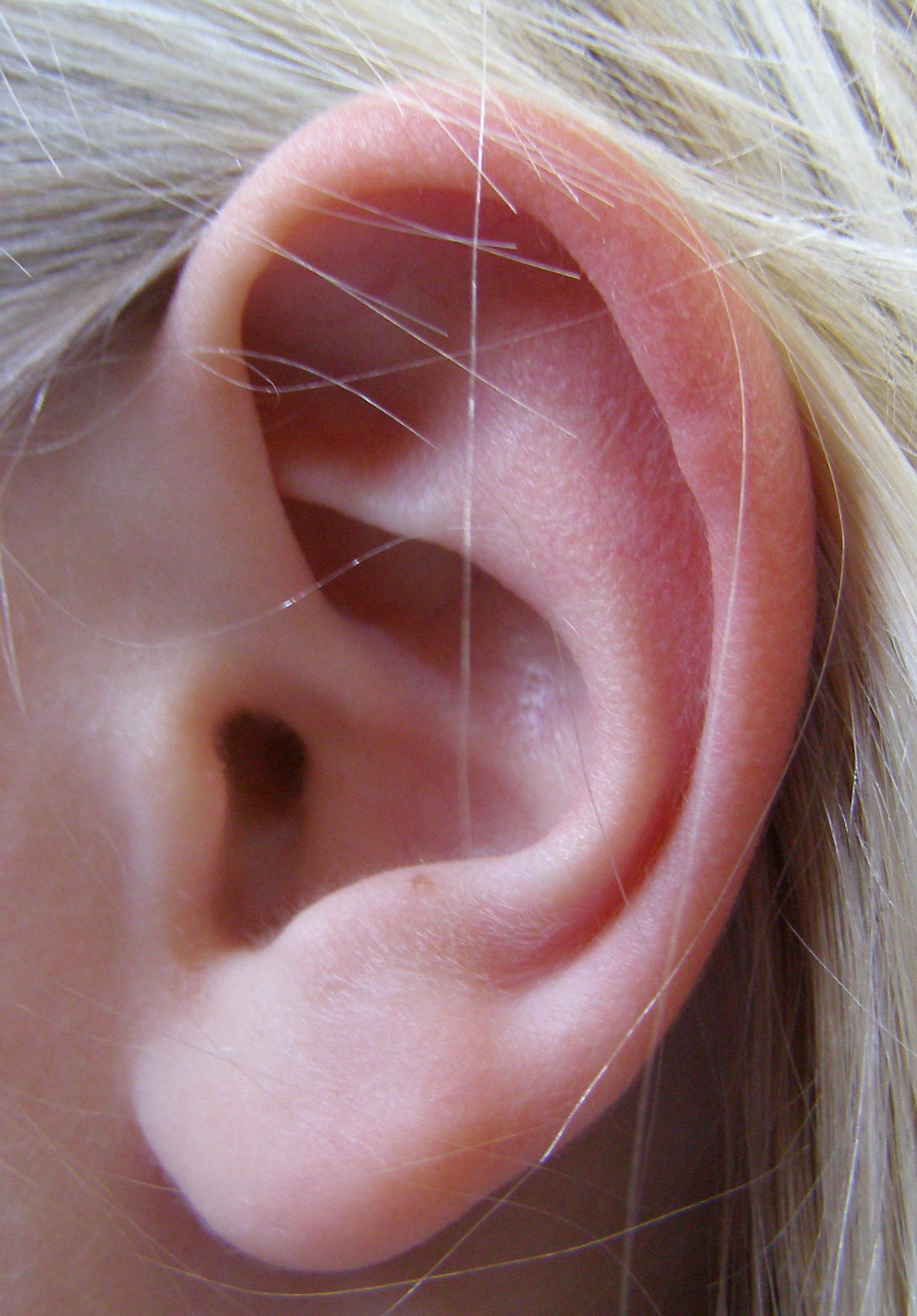
The auricle is an anatomic structure composed of a cartilage support framework covered with thin, hairless skin.

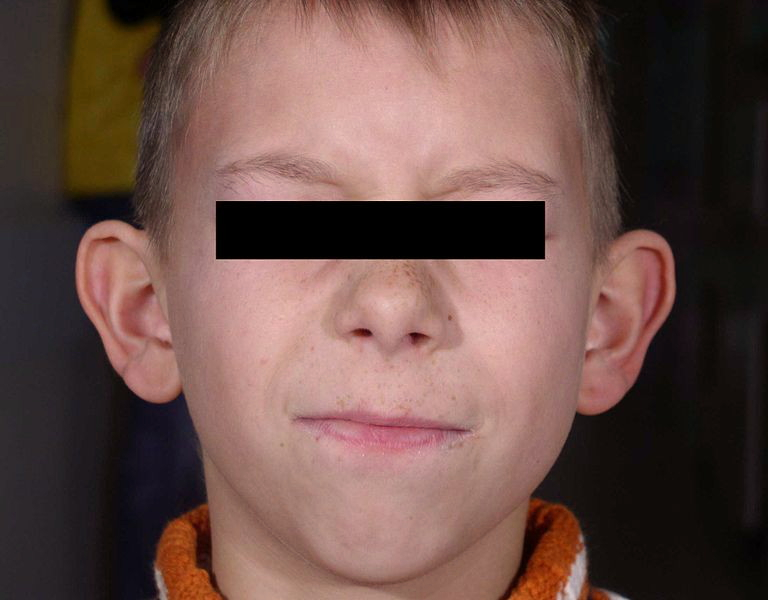
Prominent ears: the bat-wing type, which extend outwards and to the front, can be corrected with an otopexy procedure.

=== The auricle ===
The external ear (auricle) is a surgically challenging area in terms of anatomy, composed of a delicate and complex framework of shaped cartilage that is covered, on its visible surface, with thin, tightly adherent, hairless skin. Although of small area, the surface anatomy of the external ear is complex, consisting of the auricle and the external auditory meatus (auditory canal). The outer framework of the auricle is composed of the rim of the helix, which arises from the front and from below (anteriorly and inferiorly), from a crus (shank) that extends horizontally above the auditory canal. The helix merges downwards (inferiorly) into the cauda helices (tail of the helix), and connects to the lobule (earlobe). The region located between the crura (shanks) of the antihelix is the triangular fossa (depression), while the scapha (elongated depression) lies between the helix and antihelix. The antihelix borders in the middle (medially) to the rim of the concha (shell) and the concha proper, which is composed of the conchal cymba above (superiorly) and the conchal cavum below (inferiorly), which are separated by the helical crus, and meet the antihelix at the antihelical rim. The tragus (auditory canal lobule) and the antitragus (counterpart lobule) are separated by the intertragal notch; the auditory canal lobule does not contain cartilage, and displays varied morphologic shapes and attachments to the adjacent cheek and scalp.

=== Blood supply and innervation ===
The superficial temporal and posterior auricular arteries preserve the arterial blood supply of the external ear. The sensory innervation involves the front and back (anterior and posterior) branches of the greater auricular nerve, and is reinforced by the auricular temporal and lesser occipital nerves. The auricular branch of the vagus nerves supplies a portion of the posterior wall of the external auditory canal.

=== Otoplastic praxis ===
The support framework of the reconstructed auricle must be more rigid than the natural cartilage framework of a normal ear, in order for it to remain of natural size, proportion, and contour. If the reconstructed auricle framework were as structurally delicate as the cartilage framework of a natural auricle, its anatomic verisimilitude as an ear would gradually be eroded by a combination of the pressure of the tight skin-envelope in the temporal region of the head, and of the pressure of the progressive contracture of the surgical scar(s).

=== Prominent ears ===
In the practice of otoplasty, the term "prominent ears" describes external ears (auricles) that, regardless of their size, protrude from the sides of the head. The abnormal appearance exceeds the normal head-to-ear measures, wherein the external ear is less than 2 cm (0.79 in), and at an angle of less than 25 degrees, from the side of the head. Ear configurations, of distance and angle, that exceed the normal measures, appear prominent when the man or the woman is viewed from either the front or the back perspective. In the occurrence of prominent ears, the common causes of anatomic defect, deformity, and abnormality can occur individually or in combination; they are:

1. Underdeveloped antihelical fold
  This anatomic deformity occurs consequent to the inadequate folding of the antihelix, which causes the protrusion of the scapha and the helical rim. The defect is manifested by the prominence of the scapha (the elongated depression separating the helix and the antihelix) and the upper-third of the ear; and occasionally of the middle third of the ear.
2. Prominent concha
  This deformity is caused either by an excessively deep concha, or by an excessively wide concha-mastoid angle (<25 degrees). These two anatomic abnormalities can occur in combination, and produce a prominent concha (the largest, deepest concavity of the auricle), which then causes the prominence of the middle third of the external ear.
3. Protruding earlobe
  This defect of the earlobe causes the prominence of the lower third of the auricle.

Although most prominent ears are anatomically normal, morphologic defects, deformities, and abnormalities do occur, such as the:

- Constricted ear which features an abnormally small auricle, and protrudes from the head because of the inadequate development of the circumference of the helical rim, which, in turn, causes the auricle to collapse forwards, and form a 'cup ear.
- Cryptotic ear which is hidden in the side of the head. The condition of a hidden ear is produced when the developed helix of the auricle is contained under the skin of the scalp in the temporal region. (see Cryptotia)
- Macrotic ear, a prominent external ear that features an oversized auricle, but is otherwise morphologically normal. (see Macrotia)
- Question mark ear describes the ear that features a deformity of the supralobular region (upper area of the auricle), and has the appearance of a question mark.
- Stahl's ear deformity describes the presence of a third crus (shank) in the auricle, which produces a pointed elfin ear. The third crus is additional to the two crura (shanks) of the normal triangular fossa (depression), which traverses the scapha (elongated depression separating the helix and the antihelix).

=== Angles of the ear ===
==== Cephaloauricular and scaphoconchal angles ====
The degrees of angle between the head and the ear, and the degrees of angle between the scapha and the concha, determine the concept of prominent ears. The study, Comparing Cephaloauricular and Scaphaconchal Angles in Prominent Ear Patients and Control Subjects (2008) reported that the comparisons of the head-to-ear angles and the scapaha-to-concha angles of a 15-patient cohort with prominent ears, with the analogous ear angles of a 15-person control group, established that the average head-to-ear angle was 47.7 degrees for the study group, and 31.1 degrees for the control group; and that the average scapha-to-concha angle was 132.6 degrees for the study cohort, and 106.7 degrees for the control group.

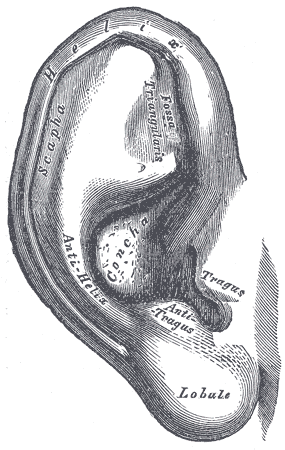
The angles of the ear determine the surgical anatomy of the auricle, as considered for otoplasty correction.

==== Antihelix ====
The antihelix normally forms a symmetric Y-shaped structure in which the gently rolled (folded) crest of the root of the antihelix continues upwards as the superior crus, and the inferior crus branches forwards, from the root, as a folded ridge. The root of the inferior crus of the antihelix sharply defines the rim of the concha. Moreover, the inferior crus also forms the wall that separates the concha from the triangular fossa. The root and superior crus of the antihelix form the anterior wall of the scaphoid fossa, and the helix forms the posterior wall. The triangular fossa dips within the Y-arms of the superior and inferior crura. The corrugated contours of these auricular crests and valleys provide a pillar effect (support) that stabilizes the auricle. The vertical walls of the conchal cup translate to a semi-horizontal plane as the concha merges with the folded crest of the antihelix. The scapha–helix is nearly parallel to the plane of the temporal surface of the head. If the roll of the antihelix and its crest are effaced and flat, rather than rolled or folded, the steep pitch of the conchal wall continues into the un-formed antihelix and scapha and ends at the helix, with little interruption. Said planar orientation places the scapha–helix complex nearly perpendicular to the temporal plane of the head — because of which the ear appears prominent, thus, such an ear also lacks the stability provided by the pillar effect, and so allows the superior auricular pole to protrude. In the literature, effacement (deficiency) of the antihelical fold is the foremost subject of most discussions of the prominent ear, because it is an aurical deformity manifested as a spectrum of defects and deformities — ranging from an indistinguishable antihelix (with a confluent concavity, from antihelix to scapha and the helical rim projected outwards and forwards) to loss of definition solely of the superior antihelix (with prominence of the upper pole of the ear).

==== Concha ====
The concha of the ear is an irregular hemispheric bowl with a defined rim. The normal scapha–helix surrounds the posterior part of the bowl (much as the brim of an inverted hat surrounds the crown). The pitch at which the scapha–helix projects from the conchal cup is determined:

1. By the acuteness of the fold of the crest of the antihelix
2. By the height of the posterior wall of the conchal bowl, and:
3. By the completeness of the hemisphere formed by the concha

If the posterior wall of the concha is excessively high, and the concha is excessively spherical, then there is an excessive angle and distance between the plane of the scapha–helix and the plane of the temporal surface of the head. Such protrusion usually is evenly distributed around the posterior conchal wall, however, the cephalad part of the concha can protrude disproportionately, another cause for a protruding upper pole. Similarly, the caudal part of the concha can project disproportionately, and cause a protruding lower auricular pole, therefore, these deformational features require special attention in the operating room.

Moreover, regarding the shape and projection of the ear, the importance of the concha must be considered in relation to the three-tiered configuration of the auricular cartilage framework, because the more delicate antihelix and helical complex are mounted upon the sturdier concha; therefore, changes in conchal size and shape greatly influence the overlying tiers, hence it is rare to see prominence of the ear that does not have a conchal element. The concha affects the prominence of the ear three-fold ways:

1. The overall enlargement of the concha projects the ear away from the mastoid surface;
2. An extension of the helical crus across the concha creates a firm cartilage bar that pushes the ear outwards
3. The effect of the angulation of the cartilage, at the junction between the cavum concha; and the sweep of cartilage up to the antitragal prominence, affects the position and prominence of the lobule (earlobe) and lower third of the ear.

Understanding the first deformational element is well recognized, and, despite limited attention to the second element, once seen, it is easily understood. Therefore, understanding the third element leads to understanding the surgical-technical approach to correcting the isolated lower-pole and lobule prominence. The latter feature of conchal shape, while not the sole cause of lobular prominence, appears to play a key role. As the cartilage angle, between the concha cavum and the antitragus, becomes more acute (i.e. as the antitragus tips closer towards the concha), this supporting structure outwardly projects the lobule and the lower-third of the ear. This feature has a greater influence upon the lobule position than does the commonly described helical tail.

==== Protruding antihelix and protruding concha combined ====
The combined effects of an effaced antihelix and a deep concha also contribute to severe auricular protrusion (a very prominent ear).

==== Protruding mastoid process ====
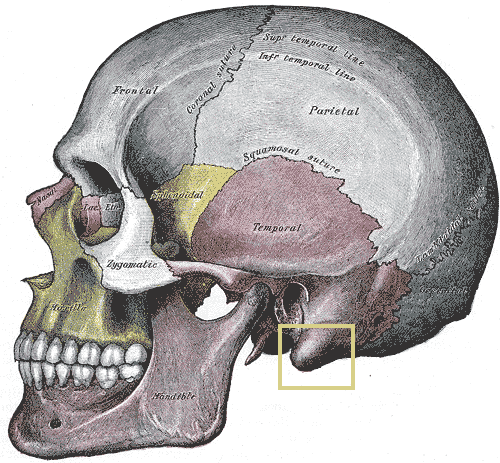
Auricular prominence: in the occipital area, behind the auricle, a protruding mastoid process is a proximate cause of bat ears.

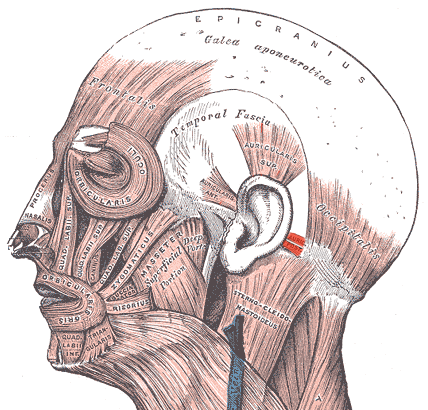
The soft tissues of the ear: the anatomic location of the posterior muscle of the ear (auricularis posterior) in relation to the auricle.

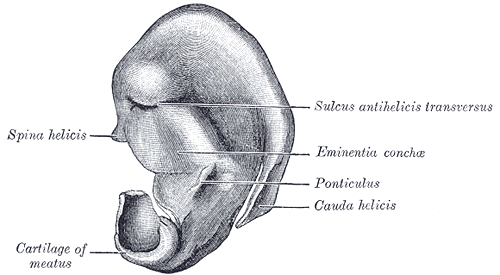
Otoplasty: The cranial surface cartilage of the right ear; the ponticulus (center right) and the cauda helicis (right) also can be proximate causes of prominent ears.

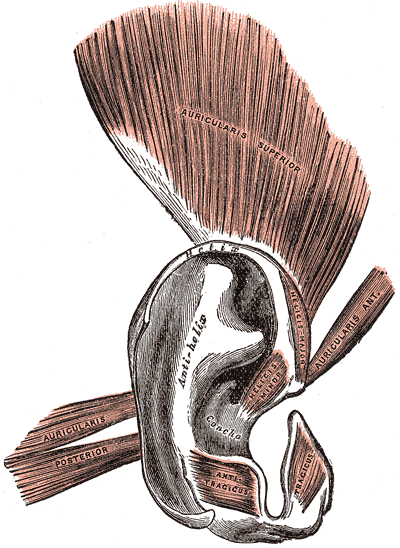
The soft tissues of the right ear: the three muscles that serve the auricle (external ear) the auricularis posterior (left), the auricularis superior (above), and the auricularis anterior (right) as considered for otoplasty correction.

==== Auricular prominence ====
The occurrence of a prominent mastoid process tends to push the concha forward, which extends the auricle (external ear) away from the side of the head. The external ear is mounted upon the bony base of the underlying temporal bone, therefore, anomalies and asymmetries of the skeletal shape can cause either auricle, or both auricles, to become prominent. In relation to the protruding mastoid process, the most recognizable skeletal anomaly is the change in the position and in the projection of the auricle, as associated with non-synostotic plagiocephaly (the positional flattening of the side of the head, not caused by the inappropriate union of two bones). Hence, in the occurrence of a flattening of the skull (parallelogram deformation of the cranial vault), the side of the head afflicted with occipital plagiocephaly presents a prominent ear. In subtle cases, the prominent ear might be more readily evident in an elder patient, whose ears are asymmetrically positioned, reason for which the residual occipital flattening (occipital plagiocephaly), and mild facial asymmetry, are unapparent at first view. This effect, of the shape of the patient's head, upon the outward and extended position of the ear is notably indicated in the 1881 illustrations that describe the Ely otoplasty technique.

==== Hemifacial microsomia ====
The undersized development of one side of a person's face, demonstrates the influence of skeletal development upon the position of the external ear on the head, as caused by the deficient morphologic development of the temporal bone, and by the medial positioning of the temporomandibular joint, the synovial joint between the temporal bone and the mandible (upper jaw). Moreover, in severe cases of hemifacial microsomia, without the occurrence of microtia (small ears), the normal external ear might appear to have been sheared off the head, because the upper half of the auricle is projecting outwards, and, at the middle point, the lower half of the auricle is canted inwards, towards the hypoplastic, underdeveloped side of the face of the patient. A similar type of asymmetric development of the head and face features a relatively broad head, a narrow face, and a narrow mandible; when observed from the front perspective, the head and face of the person present a triangular configuration. Such wide-to-narrow skeletal sloping, from the head to the face, might create the bone promontory upon which rests and from which projects the upper anatomy of the auricle, which otherwise is an external ear of normal proportions, size, and contour.

==== Protruding cauda helicis ====
The cauda helicis (tail of the helix) is bound to the fibrofatty tissues of the earlobe by a network of connective tissue. The tail of the helix (cauda helicis), which projects outwards from the concha, carries the earlobe with it, causing it to protrude, which physical condition contributes to prominence of the lower pole of the auricle.

==== Protruding earlobe ====
Given the morphological diversity of the earlobes found among men, women, and children, some earlobes are large, some earlobes are pendulous, and some earlobes are large and pendulous, but some are prominent because of the structure and form of the dense, interlacing connective tissue fibers that shape the earlobe anatomy independent of the tail of the helix (cauda helicis).

==== Soft tissues ====
Functionally, the external ear is served by three ear muscles, the auricularis posterior muscle (rear ear-muscle), the auricularis superior muscle (upper ear-muscle), and the auricularis anterior muscle (front ear-muscle), the most notable of which is the auricularis posterior muscle, which functions to pull the ear backwards, because it is superficially attached to the ponticulus (bridge) of the conchal cartilage, and to the posterior auricular ligament (rear ligament of the ear). The posterior muscle of the ear is composed of two to three fascicles (skeletal-muscle fibers contained in perimysium connective tissue), originates from the mastoid process of the temporal bone and is inserted to the lower part of the cranial surface of the concha, where it is surrounded by fibroareolar tissue deep within the temporal fascia. The posterior auricular artery irrigates the ear tissues with small, branch-artery blood vessels (rami). Likewise, the rear muscle of the ear is innervated with fine rami of the posterior auricular nerve, which is a branch of the facial nerve. Deep within these muscle and ligament structures lie the mastoid fascia and the tendinous origin of the sternomastoid muscle.

== Surgical otoplasty ==
The corrective goal of otoplasty is to set back the ears so that they appear naturally proportionate and contoured without evidence or indication of surgical correction. Therefore, when the corrected ears are viewed, they should appear normal, from the:

1. Front perspective: when the ear (auricle) is viewed from the front, the helical rim should be visible, but not set back so far (flattened) that it is hidden behind the antihelical fold.
2. Rear perspective: when the auricle is viewed from behind, the helical rim is straight, not bent, as if resembling the letter 'C' (the middle-third to flat), or crooked, as if resembling a hockey stick (the earlobe is insufficiently flat). If the helical rim is straight, the upper-, middle-, and lower-thirds of the auricle will be proportionately setback in relation to each other.
3. Side perspective: the contours of the ear should be soft and natural, not sharp and artificial.

The severity of the ear deformity that is to be corrected determines the advantageous timing of an otoplasty; for example, in children with extremely prominent ears, 4 years old is a reasonable age. In cases of macrotia associated with prominent ears, the child's age might be 2 years. Nonetheless, it is advantageous to restrict the further growth of the deformed ear. Regardless of the patient's age, the otoplasty procedure requires that the patient be under general anaesthesia.

=== Ear reconstruction ===
Generally, for reconstructing an entire ear, or a portion of the rim cartilage, the surgeon first harvests a costal cartilage graft from the patient's rib cage, which then is sculpted into an auricular framework that is emplaced under the temporal skin of the patient's head, so that the skin envelope encompass the cartilage framework, the ear prosthesis. Once placed and anchored with sutures, the surgeon then creates an auricle (outer ear) of natural proportions, contour, and appearance. In the next months, in follow-up surgeries, the surgeon then creates an earlobe, and also separates the reconstructed auricle from the side of the head (15–18 millimetres (0.59–0.71 in)), in order to create a tragus, the small, rounded projection located before the external entrance to the ear canal.

In the case of the patient encumbered with several congenital defects of the ear or who has insufficient autologous cartilage to harvest, it might be unfeasible to effect the corrections with grafts of rib cartilage. In such a case, the reconstructive Antia–Buch helical advancement technique may instead be used, wherein tissue is moved from behind the ear rim and then around and forward to repair the defective front of the ear rim. To perform the Antia–Buch helical advancement, the surgeon first designs the incision inside the helical rim and around the crus (shank) of the helix with ink. The surgeon then cuts the skin and the cartilage, but does not pierce the posterior skin of the ear. The helical rim then is advanced to allow the suturing (closure), and a dog-ear-shaped graft of skin is removed from the back of the ear. The closure of the sutures advances the crus of the helix into the helical rim.

=== Indications ===
The ear defect or deformity to be corrected determines the otoplasty techniques and procedures to be applied: for example, a torn earlobe can be repaired solely with sutures; a slight damage to the rim of the auricle might be repaired with an autologous skin graft harvested from the scalp; and conversely, a proper ear reconstruction might require several surgeries. In the correction of infantile ear defects and deformities, the otoplasty usually is performed when the child is about six years old, as the healthy ear is almost adult-sized, and thus can act as a corrective template for the auricular reconstruction.

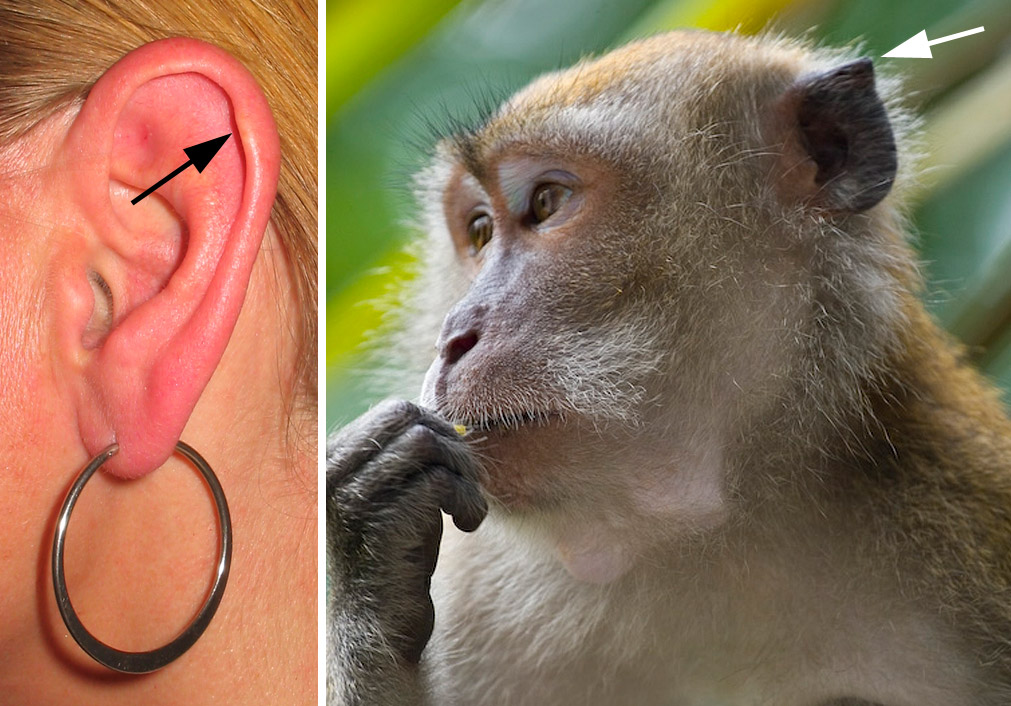
Ear showing Darwin's tubercle, an evolutionary human-ear vestige in a woman, and the like morphologic feature in a macaque monkey.

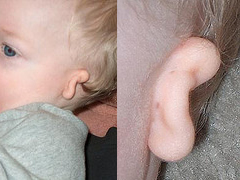
Grade III microtia affecting the left ear of a boy.

The otoplastic technique(s) applied to correct, reconstruct, or replace a deformed, defective, or a missing ear, is determined by the indications that the patient presents; some are:

- Cagot ear — A congenital defect characterized by ears without an earlobe; the name of the defect derives from the Cagot minority of northern Spain and western France, where it was a common belief that they had no earlobes.
- Cat's ear — A defect characterized by the outer edges of the ears folded forward, away from the sides of the head, and towards the face; hence the person's feline appearance. The plastic correction anchors, and thus flattens, the ear against the head.
- Cauliflower ear — An ear deformed by repeated trauma (injury) to the tissues as occurs to boxers and wrestlers; the name of deformity derives from its resemblance to a cauliflower. A hematoma might also result from an acute trauma, and, unless evacuated, the blood in the ear tends to become cartilaginous, resulting in a "cauliflower ear", which, once fully developed, is very difficult to correct. The successful management of a hematoma might require either repeated aspirations or an incision to fully evacuate the accumulated blood. After evacuation of the blood, the management of an acute othematoma of the concha features through-and-through bolster sutures to compress the skin against the cartilage, which usually prevents recurrence.
- Cleft earlobe — A defect characterized by an indentation (notch) to the fleshy portion of the earlobe. The usual correction is transplantation of an autologous tissue graft.
- Constricted ear — In mild cases of constricted ear, the crus (shank) of the helix is advanced out of the concha, and into the helical rim in order to increase its circumference. In severe cases of constricted ear, some of the cartilage is discarded and a complete reconstruction of the auricle is performed, as in the procedure for correcting microtia.
- Cryptotia — The hidden ear features the rim of the helix cartilage buried under the skin of the scalp in the temporal region. After making an incision, the upper portion of the ear is exposed by outward traction on the auricle, after making an incision around the visible helical rim. Then, the medial surface of the freed helical-rim cartilage is resurfaced either with a skin graft or with a skin flap. In most cases of cryptotia, the upper-ear cartilage that is buried under the scalp is developmentally normal, but occasionally, it is abnormal and might also require correction.
- Darwinian ear — A defect wherein the rim cartilage of the conchal bowl of the ear is flat, rather than folded inwards; it is an evolutionary remnant from when the human head muscles permitted the person to voluntarily prick up the ears in a given direction. The 'Darwinian ear' eponym derives from Charles Darwin (1809–1882), the British biologist and evolutionary theoretician (see Darwin's tubercle).
- Lop ear — A protruding ear characterized by the defects of a too-small helix (the cartilage-stiffened rim of the auricle) and a large, central depression around the auricular canal (ear opening); the combined effects of the deformations produce a "cup ear" appearance. The usual plastic correction is enlargement of the helix and closer anchoring to the head.
- Macrotia — Ears that are proportionately oversized to the person's head; the surgeon reduces them by making an incision on the lateral surface of the auricle, just inside the helical rim. The scapha (elongated hollow) is reduced, and a segment of the helical rim is excised, and the incision is closed primarily to avoid redundancy.
- Microtia — A congenital defect characterized by either the severe underdevelopment or the absence of the auricle. At one end of the spectrum is an auricle slightly smaller than normal, but of normal appearance, and at the other end of the spectrum is anotia, the absence of the auricle. The 'Nagata classification' correlates the ear deformity with the surgical approach thus:
  - Lobule type — The patient has an ear remnant and malpositioned lobule, but no concha, acoustic meatus, or tragus.
  - Concha type — The patients presents an ear remnant, malpositioned earlobe, concha (with or without acoustic meatus), tragus, and antitragus with an incisura intertragica.
  - Small concha type — The patient presents an ear remnant, malpositioned lobule, and a small indentation instead of a concha.
  - Anotia — The patient presents either no ear remnant, or a minute, ear remnant. (v) Atypical microtia — The patient presents deformities of the ear that are not comprehended in the four preceding Nagata classifications.
- Question mark ear — A rare congenital defect characterized by a protuberant auricle with a cleft (indentation) between the earlobe and the outer cartilage rim, between the fifth and sixth hillocks. This deformity also is known as 'Cosman ear', after Dr. Bard Cosman (1931–1983), the American plastic surgeon who identified it. The degree of anatomical deficiency is variable, and usually can be corrected with a cartilage graft and a V-Y advancement-flap of retroauricular skin, harvested from the back of the ear, because there often is excess skin in the upper-third of the ear being corrected. To reconstruct a 'Question mark' ear featuring a severely deformed auricle, the otoplastic procedure for correcting microtia is applied.
- Scroll ear — A congenital defect characterized by the outer edge of the ear curling forward, inwards (like a curled scroll), and towards the head.
- Skin cancer and melanoma — Cutaneous malignancies of the helical rim can be excised and closed with the Antia–Buch helical advancement technique. Cancerous lesions in the concha or over the antihelix can usually be excised and skin grafted. If the cartilage is involved, it can be excised and the graft placed directly on the posterior skin. Melanomas should be excised with the same margins as melanomas of the equivalent depth in other parts of the body. Melanoma in situ does not require a full-thickness excision, and is excised with a 5 mm (0.20 in) margin, to preserve the perichondrium, and then covered with a skin graft. Invasive melanomas of the helical rim require wedge resection to achieve adequate margins; these defects might be large and require secondary reconstruction.
- Stahl's ear deformity — A pointed-ear defect characterized by an abnormal folding of the skin and cartilage of the auricle, which produce an "elfin ear" characterized by an ear-rim with a pointed upper-edge, rather than a rounded upper-edge.
- Wildermuth's ear — A congenital defect characterized by a backwards-oriented helix (the auricle's curved, cartilage border), which deforms the ear by protruding the ante-helix (inner ridge of the auricle). The eponym derives from Hermann A. Wildermuth (1852–1907), the German neurologist who identified the defect.

=== Surgical procedures ===
Otoplastic surgery can be performed upon a patient under anesthesia — local anesthesia, local anesthesia with sedation, or general anesthesia (usual for children). In order to correct a lop ear with a small helix (the cartilage-supported outer rim of the auricle), an incision to one side of a flat cartilage piece leaves unopposed elastic forces on the opposite side, which permits the evolution of the ear contour; thus, a small incision on one side of the lop-ear cartilage, along the new anti-helical fold, can be a technical element of the corrective ear surgery. Yet, when done without an incision, the procedure is deemed an 'incisionless otoplasty', wherein the surgeon places a needle through the skin, to model the cartilage and to emplace the retention sutures that will affix the antihelix and conchal bowl areas.

==== Surgical otoplasty techniques ====
Depending upon the auricular defect, deformity, or reconstruction required, the surgeon applies these three otoplastic techniques, either individually or in combination to achieve an outcome that produces an ear of natural proportions, contour, and appearance:

- Antihelical fold manipulation
  - Suturing of the cartilage: the surgeon emplaces mattress sutures on the back of the ears, which are tied with sufficient tension to increase the definition of the antihelical fold, thereby setting back the helical rim. The cartilage is not treated. This is the technique of Mustardé and Merck, though each method differs: whereas the Mustardé method is an open invasive method, by which the cartilage on the back of the ears is extensively exposed and an area of skin is excised, the Merck method is a closed minimally invasive procedure, by which the cartilage is not exposed anywhere and skin is also not removed.
  - Stenström technique of anterior abrasion: the abrasion (roughening or scoring) of the anterior (front) surface of the anti helical fold cartilage causes the cartilage to bend away from the abraded side (per the Gibson principle), towards the side of intact perichondrium, the membrane of fibrous connective tissue.
  - Full-thickness incisions: one full-thickness incision along the desired curvature of the antihelix permits folding it with slight force, thereby creating an antihelical fold (as in the Luckett procedure). Yet, because such a fold is sharp and unnatural in appearance, the technique was modified as the Converse–Wood-Smith technique, wherein two incisions are made, running parallel to the desired antihelical fold, and tubing sutures are emplaced to create a more defined fold of natural contour and appearance.
- Conchal alteration
  - Suturing: the surgeon decreases the angle (-25 degrees) between the concha and the mastoid process of the head with sutures emplaced between the concha and the mastoid fascia.
  - Conchal excision: from either an anterior or a posterior approach, the surgeon removes a full-thickness crescent of cartilage from the posterior wall of the concha (ascertaining to neither violate nor deform the antihelical fold), to thereby reduce the height of the concha. Moreover, to avoid producing a noticeable surgical scar in the concha, the surgeon meticulously closes the conchal defect with sutures. The design of the cartilage-crescent excision means to produce a closing incision will lay at the junction of the conchal floor and the posterior conchal wall — where it is least noticeable, and causes minimal distortion of the normal contours of the ear.
  - Combination of suturing and conchal excision: the surgeon applies a corrective technique that combines the pertinent technical aspects of the Furnas suture technique and of the conchal excision techniques.
  - Medialisation of the conchal part of the antihelix: with this method, the antihelix is moved in the direction of the ear canal entrance with the fingers and fixed in this position by mattress sutures. Thus, a large cavum conchae is reduced without any excision of cartilage and the ear moves towards the head to the desired degree.

==== Correction of earlobe prominence ====
Repositioning the earlobe is the most difficult part of the otoplasty, because when an auricle that has been repositioned in its upper two-thirds, and that yet retains a prominent lobule (earlobe) will appear disproportionate to and malpositioned upon the head — as it did in the original, uncorrected deformity. The otoplastic technique most effective for lobular repositioning is the Gosain technique (or a variant), wherein the surgeon cuts the skin on the medial surface of the earlobe, and, in suturing it closed, takes a bite of the conchal undersurface to pull the earlobe towards the head.

Another prominent-earlobe correction technique is suturing the helical-cartilage tail to the concha, yet, because the tail of the helix does not extend much into the lobule, setting it back does not reliably correct the set back of the earlobe proper; other techniques involve skin excision and sutures, between the fibrofatty tissue of the lobule and the tissues of the neck.

==== Alteration of the position of the auricular upper pole ====
Depending upon the pre-surgical degree of prominence of the upper-third of the auricle, the surgical creation of the antihelical fold might be inadequate to fully correct the position of the helical rim, near the root of the helix.

=== Types of otoplastic correction ===
- Ear augmentation, addressing microtia (underdeveloped auricle) and anotia (absent auricle) involves adding structural elements to replace the missing structures. The cartilage tissue grafts for such extensive reconstructions usually are harvested either from the ear (auricular cartilage) or from the rib cage (costal cartilage).
- Ear pinback — An otopexy that "flattens" protuberant ears against the head (15–18 millimetres (0.59–0.71 in)), wherein the surgeon makes an incision to the natural crease behind (retroauricular sulcus) the external ear, and cuts a small tunnel along the front of the poorly folded antihelix. Once the cartilage is loosened, the concha (bowl) is moved closer to the head, after removing the excess skin and cartilage from the ear rim, and is sutured to reshape the antihelical fold, to balance the ear lobe (lobule) with the proportions of the auricle. The corrected ear then is emplaced and sutured closer to the head. Surgical ear pinback can be performed upon an anesthetized patient (local or general anesthesia), and usually is performed as an outpatient procedure that allows the patient to convalesce at home. The post-operative bruising and swelling usually subside within two weeks, and the narrow, surgical scars are hidden in the posterior skin folds of the ear; yet the outcome is not fully noticeable until the swelling and bruising have gone. Historically, otopexy dates from 1881, when Edward Talbott Ely first performed ear pinback plastic surgery at the Eye, Ear, and Throat Hospital, Manhattan, New York City.
- Ear reduction, addressing macrotia, might involve reducing one or more of the components of oversized ears; the incisions usually are hidden in, or near, the front folds of the auricle.

=== Post-surgical recovery ===
The internal sutures usually are permanent (non-absorbable), but the surgical wound or wounds can be sutured with either absorbable sutures or with non-absorbable sutures that the plastic surgeon removes when the surgical wound has healed. Depending upon the deformity to be corrected, the otoplasty can be performed either as an outpatient surgery or at hospital; while the operating room time varies between 1.5 and 5 hours.

For several days after the surgery, the otoplasty patient wears a voluminous, non-compressive dressing upon the corrected ear(s), and must avoid excessive bandage pressure upon the ear during the convalescent period, lest it cause pain and increased swelling, which might lead to the abrasion, or even to the necrosis of the ear's skin. After removing the dressing, the patient then wears a loose headband whilst sleeping for a 3–6-week period; it should be snug, not tight, because its purpose is preventing the corrected ear(s) from being pulled forward, when the sleeping patient moves whilst asleep. An overly-tight headband can abrade and erode the side surface of the ear, possibly creating an open wound. A dressing does not have to be worn if the patient was operated upon with the stitch method.

=== Complications ===
- Hematoma: a hematoma can be immediately addressed if the patient complains of excessive pain, or when the surgical wound bleeds. The dressing is immediately removed from the ear to ascertain the existence of a hematoma, which then is immediately evacuated. If the surgical wound is infected, antibiotic therapy helps avoid the occurrence either of abscess or of perichondritis (inflammation).
- Infection: cellulitis is rare after otoplasty, but it is treated aggressively, with antibiotics in order to avoid chondritis, a condition potentially requiring debridement, and which may permanently disfigure the ear.
- Suture complications: suture extrusion in the retroauricular sulcus (the groove behind the ear) is the most common otoplastic complication following corrective surgery. Such extruded sutures are easy to remove, but the extrusion occurrence might be associated with granulomas, which are painful and unattractive. This complication might be avoided by using absorbable sutures; to which effect, monofilament sutures are likelier to protrude, but have a lesser incidence rate of granulomas, whereas braided sutures are unlikely to protrude, but have a greater incidence rate of granulomas.
- Overcorrection and unnatural contour: the most common, but significant, complication of otoplasty is overcorrection, which can be minimized by the surgeon's detailed attention to the functional principles of the surgical technique employed. Hence, function over form minimizes the creation of the unnatural contours characteristic of the "technically perfect ear".

== Non-surgical otoplasty ==
=== Indications ===
==== Incidence of ear deformity ====
Approximately 20–30 per cent of newborn children are born with deformities of the external ear (auricle) that can occur either in utero (congenitally) or in the birth canal (acquired). The possible defects and deformities include protuberant ears ("bat ears"); pointed ears ("elfin ears"); helical rim deformity, wherein the superior portion of the ear lacks curvature; cauliflower ear, which appears as if crushed; lop ear, wherein the upper portion of the auricle is folded onto itself; and others. Such deformities usually are self-correcting, but, if at 1 week of age, the child's external ear deformity has not self-corrected, then either surgical correction (otoplasty 5–6 years of age) or non-surgical correction (tissue molding) is required to achieve an ear of normal proportions, contour, and appearance.

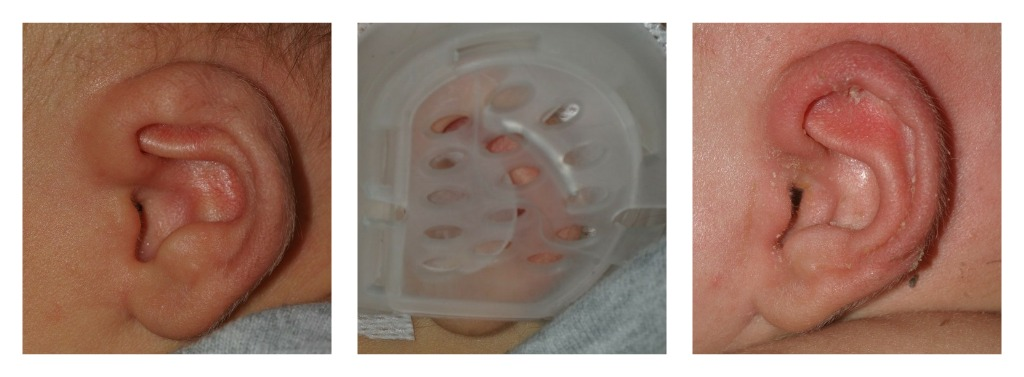
Non-surgical otoplasty: the therapeutic aspects, before (left), during (center), and after (right), of a tissue-molding procedure performed with an EarWell device.If detected early, Infant’s ear molding can permanently correct ear shape without the need for surgery. However, if ear deformities go unnoticed or untreated during infancy, surgical otoplasty might be considered later in childhood to achieve long-lasting results.

=== Tissue molding ===
In the early weeks of infancy, the cartilage of the infantile auricle is unusually malleable, because of the remaining maternal estrogens circulating in the organism of the child. During that biochemically privileged period, prominent ears, and related deformities, can be permanently corrected by molding the auricles (ears) to the correct shape, either by the traditional method of taping, with tape and soft dental compound (e.g. gutta-percha latex), or solely with tape; or with non-surgical tissue-molding appliances, such as custom-made, defect-specific splints designed by the physician. Therapeutically, the splint-and-adhesive-tape treatment regimen is months-long, and continues until achieving the desired outcome, or until there is no further improvement in the contour of the auricle, likewise, with the custom and commercial tissue-molding devices.

==== Taping ====
The traditional, non-surgical correction of protuberant ears is taping them to the head of the child, in order to "flatten" them into the normal configuration. The physician effects this immediate correction to take advantage of the maternal estrogen-induced malleability of the infantile ear cartilages during the first 6 weeks of their life. The taping approach can involve either adhesive tape and a splinting material, or only adhesive tape; the specific deformity determines the correction method. This non-surgical correction period is limited, because the extant maternal estrogens in the child's organism diminish within 6–8 weeks; afterwards, the ear cartilages stiffen, thus, taping the ears is effective only for correcting "bat ears" (prominent ears), and not the serious deformities that require surgical re-molding of the auricle to produce an ear of normal size, contour, and proportions. Furthermore, ear correction by splints and tape requires the regular replacement of the splints and the tape, and especial attention to the child's head for any type of skin erosion, because of the cumulative effects of the mechanical pressures of the splints proper and the adhesive of the fastener tape.

==== Physician-designed splints ====
Congenital ear deformities are defined as either malformations (microtia, cryptotia) or deformations, wherein the term "ear deformation" implies a normal chondrocutaneous component with an abnormal auricular architecture. The conditions are categorized as constricted ears, Stahl's ear deformity, and prominent ears, which derive from varied causes, such as the abnormal development and functioning of the intrinsic and extrinsic ear muscles, which might generate forces that deform the auricle; and external forces consequent to malpositioning of the head during the prenatal and neonatal periods of the child's life. A study, Postpartum Splinting of Ear Deformities (2005), reported the efficacy of splinting the ears of a child during the early neonatal period as a safe and effective non-surgical treatment for correcting congenital ear deformities. The study used a variety of physician-designed, physician-fabricated and commercially fabricated splints, such as a wire core segment in 6-French silastic tubing, self-adhering foam, temporary stopping with dental material, dental waxes, thermoplastic materials and other commercial ear-splint devices.

== See also ==
- Ear shaping
- Plastic surgery
- Maxillofacial surgery
- Otolaryngology

== Bibliography ==
- Thorne, Charles (2007). Thorne, Charles (ed.). Grabb and Smith's Plastic Surgery (6th ed.). Lippincott Williams & Wilkins. doi:10.1097/01.prs.0000238227.88345.ae. ISBN 978-0781746984.
- Rinzler, CA (2009). The Encyclopedia of Cosmetic and Plastic Surgery. New York City: Facts on File.
