= Cryptotia =

- Other names: Familial cryptotia
- This condition is inherited in an autosomal dominant manner

Cryptotia is the condition where an ear appears to have its upper portion buried underneath the side of the head. The condition also involves underdeveloped scapha and antihelical crura. Cryptotia is also known as buried ear or hidden ear.

== Signs and symptoms ==
The invagination of the upper portion of the auricle beneath the auricular cartilage deformity is one of the most prevalent characteristics of cryptotia.

== Diagnosis ==
Based on the kind of antihelix deformity and the condition of the intrinsic auricular muscle, there are two types of cryptotia. Type I cryptotia is characterized by compression of the antihelix's body and superior crus, burying the upper portion beneath the skin. The inferior crus of the antihelix is severely bent over in type II cryptotia, and the antihelix's body has contracted grossly.

== Treatment ==
Cyptotia can easily be treated with ear molds when the child is still a newborn as the maternal estrogen still present in baby helps to reshape the ear. If cryptotia isn't corrected in infancy it can be treated later in life when the ears are fully grown (around age 5 or 6) through surgery which involves releasing the ear from its buried position, reshaping the cartilage and using local tissue to resurface the released cartilage.

== Epidemiology ==
Cryptotia is common amongst Asians but rare in Europeans. Based on studies the incident of cryptotia in Japan is about 1 in every 400 births.

== See also ==
- Otoplasty
- Ear shaping
- Otolaryngology
