= Docking (dog) =

Removal of a dog's tail

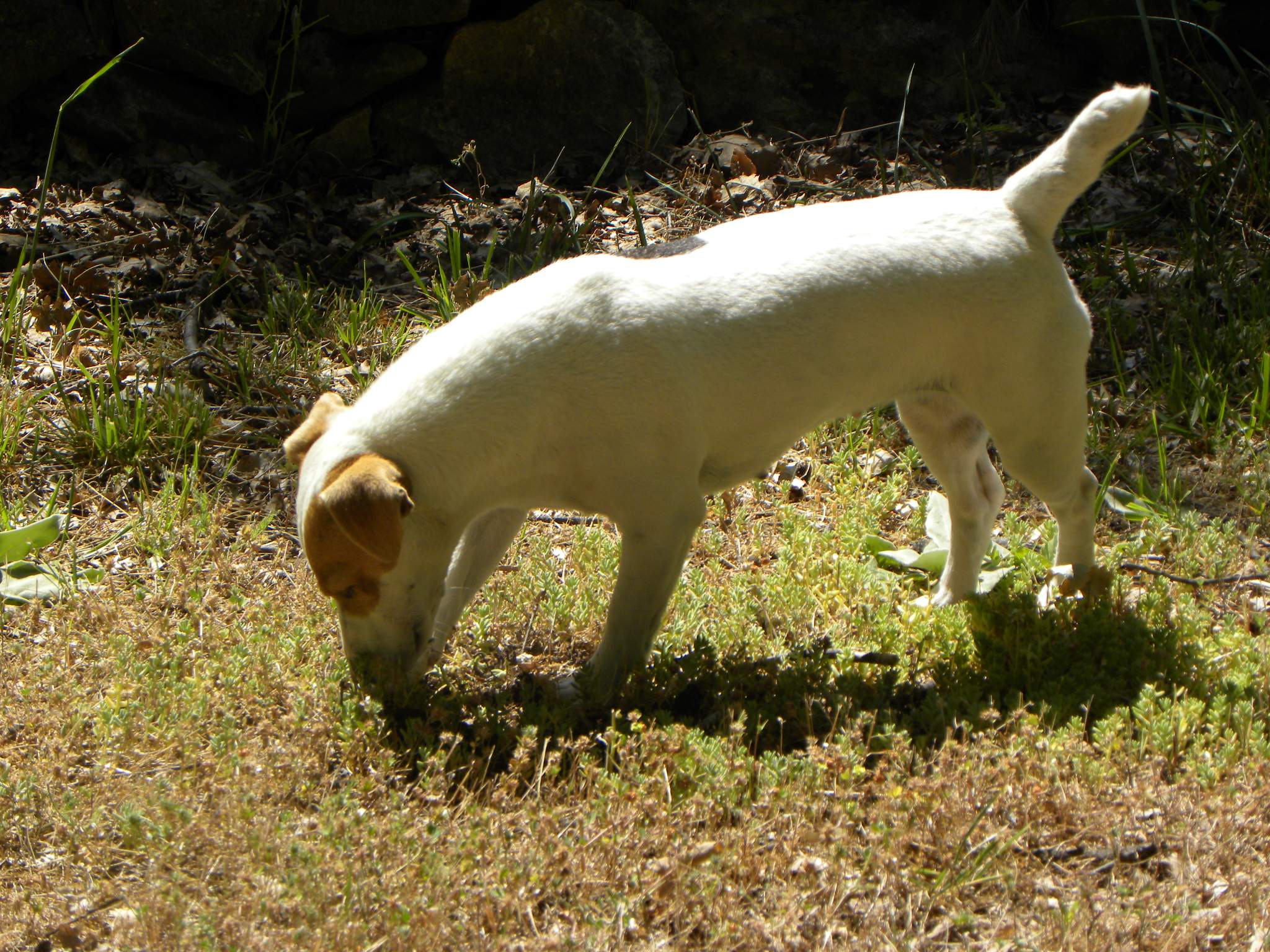
Dog with partially docked tail.

Docking or bobbing is the removal of portions of an animal's tail. It should not be confused with cropping, the amputation of ears. Tail docking may be performed cutting the tail with surgical scissors (or a scalpel) or constricting the blood supply to the tail with a rubber ligature for a few days until the tail falls off. The length to which tails are docked varies by breed, and is often specified in the breed standard. Docking is illegal, or restricted, in many countries. Some dog breeds have naturally occurring bobtail lines. These appear similar to docked dogs but are a distinct naturally occurring phenotype.

== History ==
=== Purpose ===
Historically, tail docking was thought to prevent rabies, strengthen the back, increase the animal's speed, and prevent injuries when ratting, fighting, and baiting.

Tail docking is done in modern times either for prophylactic, therapeutic, cosmetic purposes, and/or to prevent injury. For dogs that work in the field, such as some hunting dogs, herding dogs, or terrier dogs, tails can collect burrs and foxtails, causing pain and infection and, due to the tail's wagging, may be subject to abrasion or other injury while moving through dense brush or thickets. Bones in the tail can also be broken by pulling or impact in the field, causing spinal injury to the tail. The American Veterinary Medical Association (the largest veterinary professional organization in the United States), disputes these justifications, saying "These justifications for docking working dogs' tails lack substantial scientific support. In the largest study to date on tail injuries in dogs the incidence was 0.23% and it was calculated that approximately 500 dogs need to be docked to prevent one tail injury."

=== Modern practice ===
Docking of puppies at 3 to 5 days old is routinely carried out by both breeders and veterinarians without anesthesia.

While the tails of some working dogs are docked to prevent injury or infection, the tails of larger dogs commonly used for guard work or protection work (not to be confused with patrol work where a handler can provide secondary aid) may be docked to prevent their tails from being grabbed in a fight. This is most common in the Rottweiler, Doberman Pinscher, Bandog, Cane Corso, Boerboel, etc.

=== Criticism ===
Robert Wansborough found in a 1996 paper that docking tails puts dogs at a disadvantage in several ways. First, dogs use their tails to communicate with other dogs (and with people); a dog without a tail might be significantly handicapped in conveying fear, caution, aggression, playfulness, and so on. Leaver and Reimchen, in 2007, found that longer tails were more effective than shorter tails at "conveying different intraspecific cues, such as those provided by tail motion".

It has also been suggested that certain breeds use their tails as rudders when swimming, and possibly for balance when running; so active dogs with docked tails might be at a disadvantage compared to their tailed peers. Videos comparing docked and undocked dogs running and jumping show that dogs who are docked have to work harder to compensate for the loss of the tail. Canine pathologist and sports-medicine expert Prof. Chris Zink believes the extra stress imposed on the joints can have long-term health consequences.

In 2007, Stephen Leaver, a graduate student at the University of Victoria, published a paper on tail docking which found that tail length was important in the transmission of social cues. The study found that dogs with shorter tails (docked tails) would be approached with caution, as if the approaching dog was unsure of the emotional state of the docked dog. The study goes on to suggest that dogs with docked tails may grow up to be more aggressive. The reasoning postulated by Tom Reimchen, UVic Biologist and supervisor of the study, was that dogs who grew up without being able to efficiently transmit social cues would grow up to be more anti-social and thus more aggressive.

Docking has been condemned by the American Veterinary Medical Association, the American Animal Hospital Association, and the Canadian Veterinary Medical Association. These organizations have also called on breed organizations to remove docking from all breed standards.

=== Influence of kennel clubs ===
Critics point out that kennel clubs with breed standards that do not make allowance for uncropped or undocked dogs put pressure on owners and breeders to continue the practice. Although the American Kennel Club (AKC) says that it has no rules that require docking or that make undocked animals ineligible for the show ring, standards for many breeds put undocked animals at a disadvantage for the conformation show ring. The American breed standard for boxers, for example, recommends that an undocked tail be "severely penalized".

The AKC position is that ear cropping and tail docking are "acceptable practices integral to defining and preserving breed character and/or enhancing good health", even though the practice is currently opposed by the American Veterinary Medical Association.

== Legal status ==
Today, many countries ban cropping and docking because they consider the practices unnecessary, painful, cruel or mutilation. In Europe, the cropping of ears is prohibited in all countries that have ratified the European Convention for the Protection of Pet Animals. Some countries that ratified the convention made exceptions for tail docking.

=== United Kingdom ===
Show dogs are no longer docked in the United Kingdom. A dog docked before 28 March 2007 in Wales and 6 April 2007 in England may continue to be shown at all shows in England, Wales, Scotland and Northern Ireland throughout its life. A dog docked on, or after, the above dates, regardless of where it was docked, may not be shown at shows in England and Wales where the public is charged a fee for admission. Where a working dog has been docked in England and Wales under the respective regulations, however, it may be shown where the public is charged a fee, so long as it is shown "only to demonstrate its working ability." It will thus be necessary to show working dogs in such a way as to demonstrate their working ability and not conformity to a standard. A dog legally docked in England, Wales, Northern Ireland, or abroad may be shown at any show in Scotland or Northern Ireland.

==== England and Wales ====
In England and Wales, ear cropping is illegal, and no dog with cropped ears can take part in any Kennel Club event (including agility and other non-conformation events). Tail docking is also illegal, except for a few working breeds; this exemption applies only when carried out by a registered veterinary surgeon.

The Animal Welfare Act 2006 makes the docking of dogs' tails a criminal offence, except for working dogs such as those used by the police force, the military, rescue services, pest control, and those used in connection with lawful animal shooting. Three options were presented to Parliament in March 2006 with Parliament opting for the second:

- An outright ban on docking dogs' tails (opposed by a majority of 278 to 267)
- A ban on docking dogs' tails with an exception for working dogs (supported by a majority of 476 to 63)
- Retention of the status quo.

Those convicted of unlawful docking are liable to a fine of up to £20,000, up to 69 weeks of imprisonment, or both.

Prior to the ban, the Royal College of Veterinary Surgeons (RCVS), the regulatory body for veterinary surgeons in the United Kingdom, had stated in the 1990s that they considered tail docking to be "an unjustified mutilation and unethical unless done for therapeutic or acceptable prophylactic reasons." In 1995, a veterinary surgeon was brought before the RCVS disciplinary council for "disgraceful professional conduct" for carrying out cosmetic docking. The surgeon claimed that the docking was performed to prevent future injuries, and the case was dismissed for lack of evidence otherwise. Although cosmetic docking was still considered unacceptable by the RCVS, no further disciplinary action was taken against vets performing docking prior to the implementation of the ban.

==== Northern Ireland ====
In Northern Ireland, legislation known as Welfare of Animals Act (Northern Ireland) 2011 made tail docking illegal except for certain working dogs.

==== Scotland ====
In Scotland, docking of any breed is illegal. The Animal Health and Welfare (Scotland) Act 2006 contains provisions prohibiting the mutilation of domesticated animals. However, the Scottish government has carried out a consultation on this issue and declared that they intend to legislate to bring the law in Scotland in line with the law in England and Wales, meaning that there will be an exemption for certain breeds of working dogs. This is due to the increase in serious spinal trauma reported in field dogs with undocked tails.

=== Legal status of dog tail docking and ear cropping by country ===
Status of docking as of 2017 Unrestricted Restricted (can only be performed by a vet) Ear cropping banned, tail docking permitted or restricted Banned for cosmetic purposes Banned with few exceptions

Country	Status	Ban/restriction date (if applicable)
Afghanistan	Unrestricted	
Argentina	Unrestricted	
Australia	Banned in all states and territories.	June 2004 (East); 16 March 2010 (WA)
Austria	Banned	1 January 2005
Belgium	Banned	1 January 2006
Bolivia	Unrestricted	
Bosnia and Herzegovina	Restricted: allowed for "dogs that benefit from the procedure"	
Brazil	Banned for cosmetic purposes	
Canada	Canada has no federal law banning pet cosmetic surgery. The Canadian Veterinary Medical Association opposes all cosmetic practices. Several provinces have provincial legislation against tail docking, ear cropping, and most cosmetic surgeries: Illegal since 2015 in Prince Edward Island; Illegal in Newfoundland and Labrador under the Newfoundland and Labrador Regulation 35/12 on 2 May 2012.; Illegal in Nova Scotia since October 2018. Previously the practice had been banned for veterinarians.; Three provincial veterinary associations have bans on their veterinarians performing tail docking, ear cropping, and most cosmetic surgeries: Since 2008 by the New Brunswick Veterinary Medical Association (NBVMA); To take effect first of January 2017, a total ban on cosmetic surgery, by the Ordre des médecins vétérinaires du Québec (OMVQ); The Alberta Veterinary Medical Association voted to forbid the practices in February 2019.; Three Provincial veterinary associations with ear cropping bans are open to a future ban of tail docking: Since 2013 the Saskatchewan Veterinary Medical Association banned cosmetic ear cropping (bylaw 33.6); Since 2015 the College of Veterinarians of British Columbia (CVBC)); Since 2012, Bylaw 31, by Manitoba Veterinary Medical Association (MVMA)	
Chile	Banned	
Colombia	Banned	
Costa Rica	Unrestricted	
Croatia	Banned	
Cyprus	Banned	1991
Czech Republic	Ear cropping banned, tail docking unrestricted	
Denmark	Banned, with exceptions for five gun dog breeds	1 June 1996
Egypt	Unrestricted	
England	Ear cropping banned in 1899. Tail docking restricted since 2007, can only be done by a vet on certain working dog breeds.	2006
Estonia	Banned	2001
Finland	Banned	1 July 1996
France	Tail docking is unrestricted (France opted out of the rule regarding docking when it ratified the European Convention for the Protection of Pet Animals) Any other surgery for aesthetic purposes (such as ear cropping) is banned since 2009	
Germany	Banned, with exceptions for working gun dogs.	1 May 1998
Greece	Banned	1991
Guatemala	Banned for cosmetic purposes.	2017
Hungary	Ear cropping is banned, tail docking is allowed until the puppy is 7 days old.	2012
Iceland	Banned	2001
India	Unrestricted, from Madras High Court ruling (WP No. 1750/2012)	
Indonesia	Unrestricted	
Iran	Unrestricted – tail docking and ear trimming are still taught in veterinary faculties in Iran	
Ireland	Banned	7 March 2014
Israel	Banned for cosmetic purposes.	2000
Italy	Banned	
Japan	Unrestricted	
Kuwait	Unrestricted	
Latvia	Banned	
Lebanon	Unrestricted	
Lithuania	Banned	
Luxembourg	Banned	1991
Malaysia	Unrestricted	
Morocco	Unrestricted: Morocco has no animal protection laws	
Mauritius	Unrestricted	
Mexico	Unrestricted	
Nepal	Unrestricted	
Netherlands	Banned	1 September 2001
New Zealand	Cropping ears and docking is banned.	1 October 2018
Northern Ireland	Ear cropping illegal. Tail docking restricted since 2013, can only be done by a vet on certain working dog breeds.	
Norway	Banned	1987
Peru	Unrestricted	
Philippines	Unrestricted	
Portugal	Cropping ears is banned. Docking tails is allowed, as long as it's performed by a veterinarian.	2001
Poland	Banned	1997
Russia	Restricted	
Scotland	Banned	2006
Serbia	Ear cropping banned, tail docking banned for cosmetic purposes but allowed for medical purposes and some working breeds	2011
Slovakia	Banned	1 January 2003
Slovenia	Banned	April 2007
South Africa	The South African Veterinary Council has banned veterinarians from performing this procedure (unless for medical purposes). Ear cropping is also banned.	1 June 2008
Spain	Banned in some autonomies	
Sri Lanka	Unrestricted	
Sweden	Banned	1989
Switzerland	Banned	1 July 1981 (ears); 1988 (tails)
Taiwan	Unrestricted	
Thailand	Unrestricted	
Tunisia	Unrestricted	
Turkey	Banned	24 June 2004
United States	Unrestricted. Some states, including New York and Vermont, have considered bills to make the practice illegal.	
Virgin Islands, British	Banned	2005
Wales	Restricted: can only be done by vet on a number of working dog breeds.	2006

== See also ==
- Debeaking
- Declawing
- Dubbing (poultry)
- Ear cropping
- Natural bobtail
