= Ponticulus =

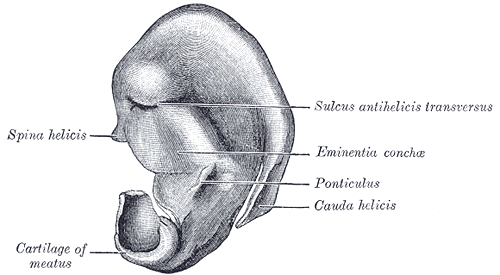
- Cranial surface of cartilage of right auricula. (Ponticulus visible at center right.)

Details

Identifiers
- Latin: p. auriculae

The ponticulus is a vertical ridge that crosses the eminentia conchae, which gives attachment to the auricularis posterior muscle.

Some researchers suggest it is a remnant of a protective bony canal found in lower primates.
