= Macrotia =

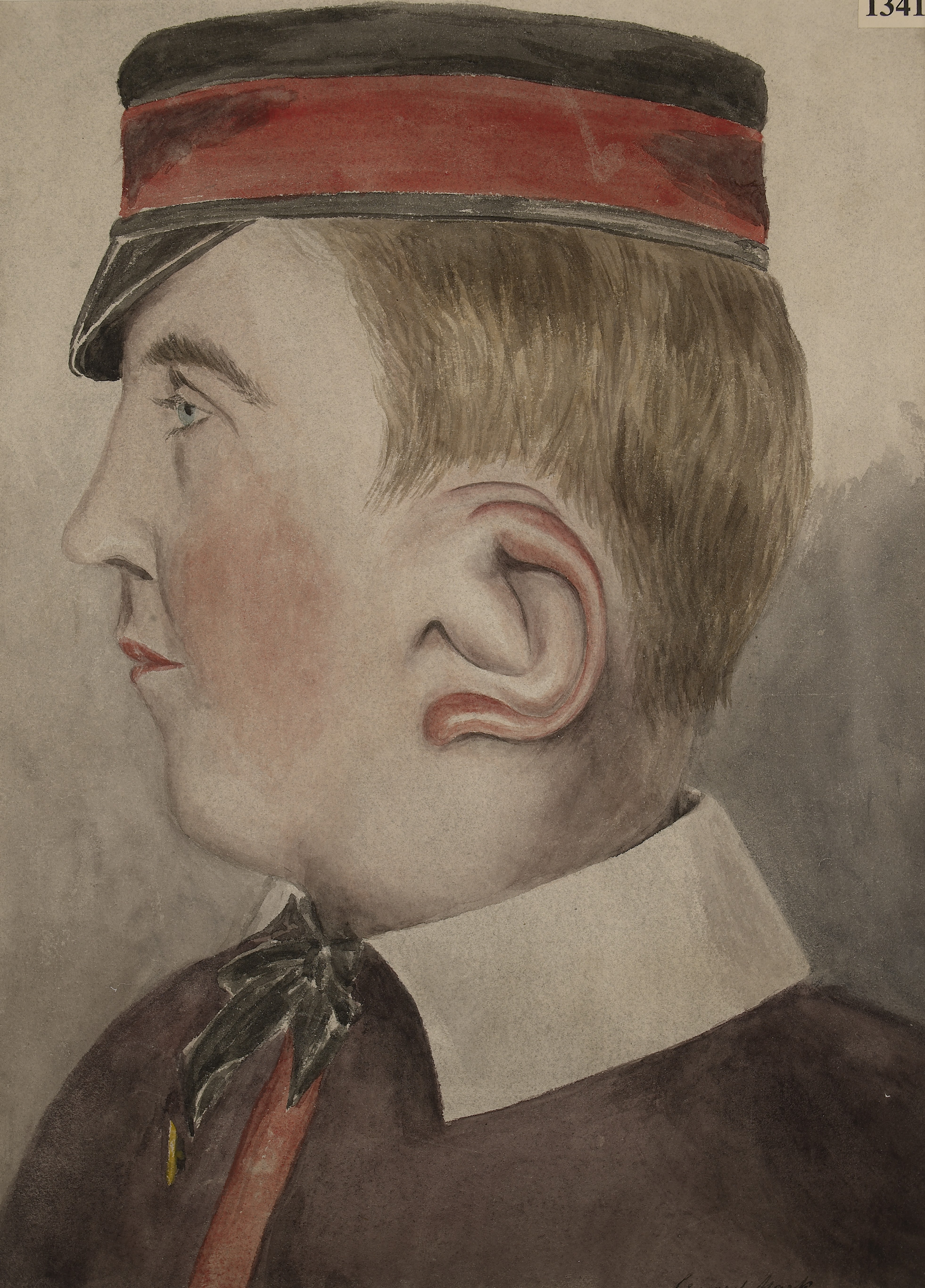
- 14-year-old boy with macrotia from hypertrophy
- Specialty: Medical genetics, ENT surgery

Macrotia refers to an ear that is larger than would be expected. The normal auricular axis length is 58–62 mm (2.3–2.4 in) among females and 62–66 mm (2.4–2.6 in) among males. The average width of an adult ear, specifically the distance between the helix root (inner front edge) and the posterior auricle (outer front edge), is between 30 and 40 mm (1.2 and 1.6 in).

== Treatment ==
Macrotia is an external ear malformation and is not known to cause any hearing impairment on its own, although it may occasionally occur simultaneously with other developmental disorders that do affect hearing. Treatment is typically not necessary, although patients may seek cosmetic treatment. In some cases, surgery (otoplasty) is performed to reduce the ear size. While generally considered a cosmetic procedure, otoplasty for macrotia can improve overall quality of life, especially for young patients who may be able to avoid reduced self-esteem and social avoidance behavior due to large ears. Otoplasty for macrotia typically focuses on reducing the size of the scapha, which is the concave region of the ear between the helix and antihelix ridge, while preserving ear shape and contour.
