= Ear shaping =

Modification of the shape of the ear

Ear shaping is a form of body modification involving altering the shape of the ear. Ear shaping can be achieved through the medical procedure otoplasty, and is also performed by body modification artists.

== Types ==
=== Amputation ===
In this form of ear shaping, the lobe or other portions of the ear are amputated to give the desired look. This may also be undertaken to remove stretched portions that are no longer wanted. Sutures or cauterizing may be required.

=== Cropping ===
Ear cropping is commonly performed on animals, for both cosmetic and other reasons, but rarely on humans. In humans, cropping usually involves the removal of part of the upper ear with a scalpel. Suturing or cauterizing may be required.

=== Pointing ===
Ear pointing or "elfing" by various methods is undertaken to give them an appearance similar to that of elves or Vulcans. A common method is to remove a small wedge-shaped portion at the top of the ear, and then suture the two edges. The development of this procedure is generally credited to Steve Haworth.

Originally the shape was achieved by folding and trimming the client's helix and sutured together to achieve a pointed look. But a new procedure has been developed by Samppa Von Cyborg, which gives the pointed ears a far more natural look.
