= Merck stitch method =

Surgical procedure for pinning protruding ears

- Specialty: Otorhinolaryngology

The Merck stitch method is a minimally invasive procedure for pinning protruding ears, developed by W. H. Merck. The method belongs to the special types of ear pinning surgeries. In contrast to other variations of minimally invasive procedures the stitch method does not use additional techniques from the traditional ear pinning surgeries (otoplasty). It belongs to the closed ear pinning surgeries because the ear is not cut open for the placement of the sutures. According to the experience of the author the Stitch Method is suitable for all protruding ears. The stitch method is the most frequently performed otoplasty among the minimally invasive methods.

== History ==
The technique of the stitch method, as well as its results and possible risks, was described by Merck in 2013. According to his information, he developed it in 1995 and used it on a great number of patients from 1996. Fritsch also operated on 13 patients with this technique, but did not restrict himself solely to it, and combined it with the conventional Furnas method. In his later publications Fritsch abandoned this method in the belief that permanent results could only be obtained if the anterior surface of the antihelix fold was pierced, scored or deeply incised, and cut through completely at times. He did this with the aim of reducing the tension in the cartilage in this way. According to Merck, this is not necessary and he proved this on several thousand operated ears.

== Surgery ==
Through stab incisions in the retroauricular sulcus (the groove behind the ear), permanent, non-absorbable sutures are placed invisible under the skin around the cartilage of the antihelix using a special technique, pulled tight and knotted. When the sutures are tightened, the ear moves towards the head. The cartilage is not worked on. A protruding earlobe can be pinned closer to the head with the Merck stitch method if the cartilage of the ear extends a little into the earlobe.

== Complications ==
Pain; suture extrusion; infection; rare suture granuloma or atheroma; slight, harmless post-operative bleeding; relapse(recurrence of protruding ear).
