= Helix (ear) =

Part of the human ear

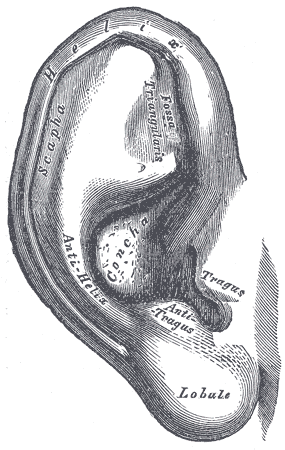
- The auricle seen from the side

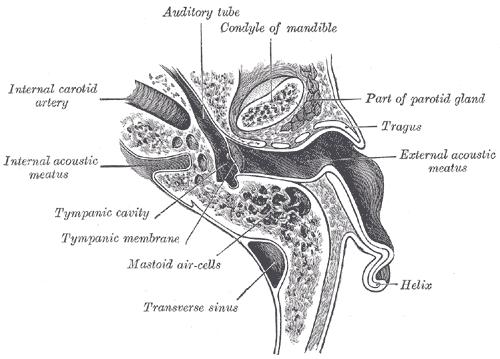
- Horizontal section through left ear; upper half of section (helix labeled at bottom right)

Details

Identifiers
- Latin: helix
- TA98: A15.3.01.005
- TA2: 106
- FMA: 60992

The helix is the prominent rim of the auricle. Where the helix turns downwards posteriorly, a small tubercle is sometimes seen, namely the auricular tubercle of Darwin.

== Additional images ==
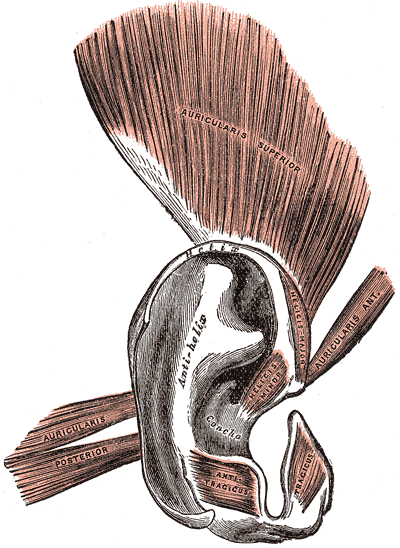
The muscles of the auricula.

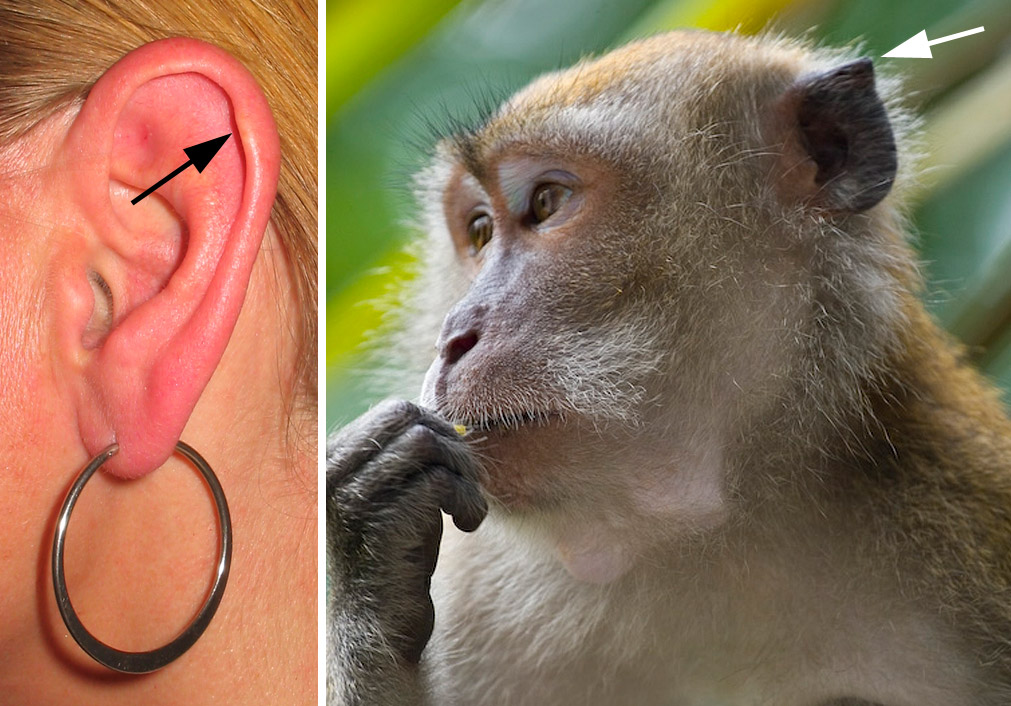
Left: Darwin's tubercle. Right: the homologous point in a macaque.

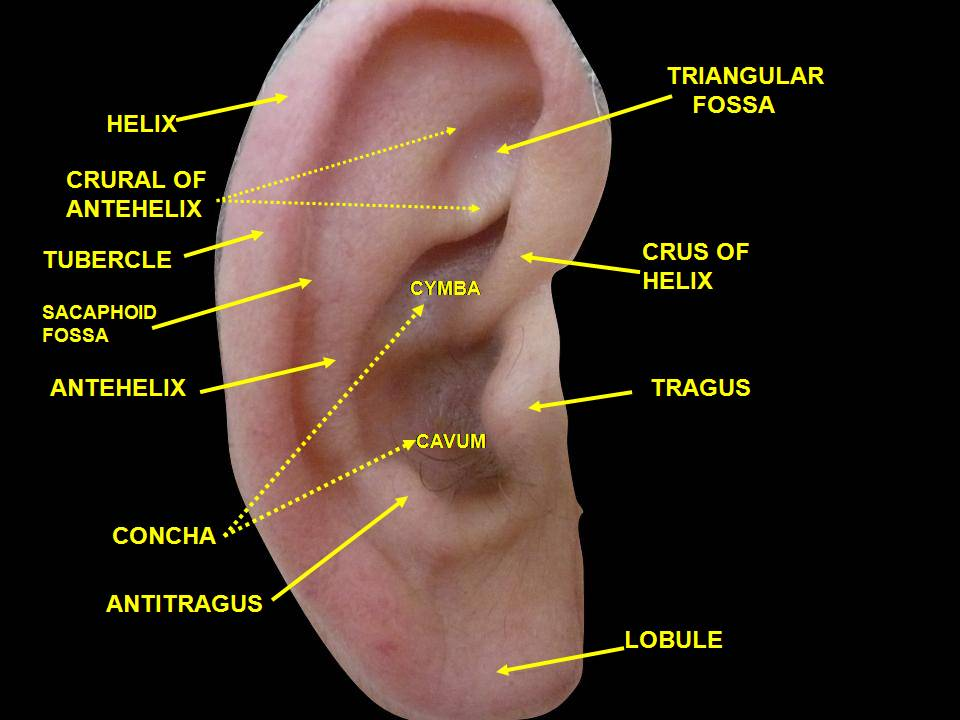
External ear. Right auricle. Lateral view.

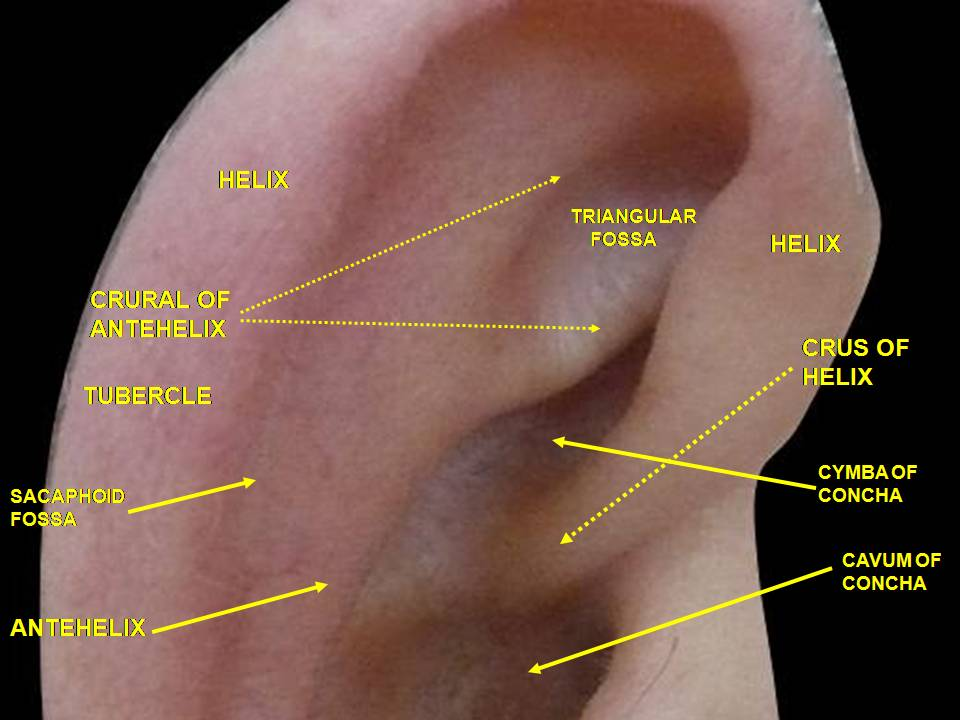
External ear. Right auricle. Lateral view.

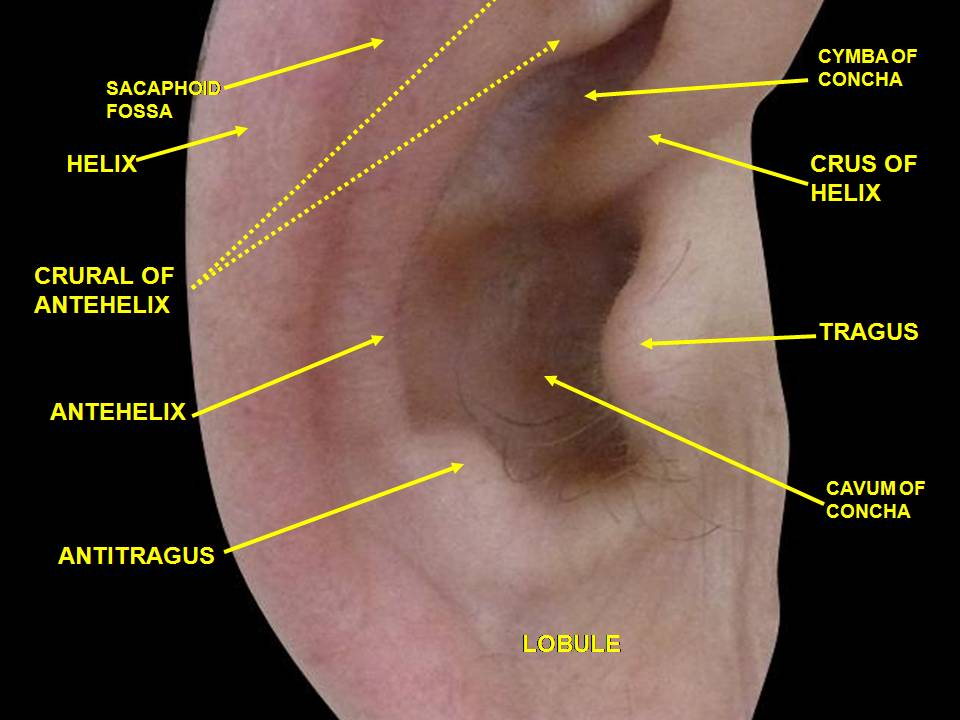
External ear. Right auricle. Lateral view.
