= Auricle (anatomy) =

Visible part of the ear that is outside the head

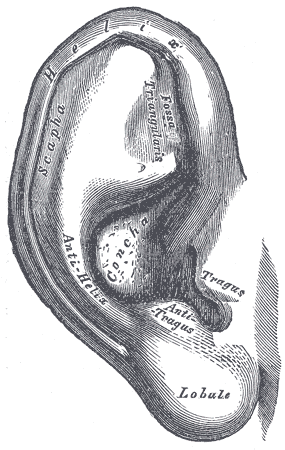
- The auricula. Lateral surface.

Details
- Artery: Posterior auricular, anterior auricular
- Nerve: Trigeminal nerve, great auricular nerve, lesser occipital nerve
- Lymph: To pre- and post-auricular nodes, nodes of parotid and cervical chains

Identifiers
- Latin: auricula
- MeSH: D054644
- TA98: A15.3.01.002
- TA2: 104, 6863
- FMA: 56580

The auricle or auricula is the visible part of the ear that is outside the head. It is also called the pinna (Latin for 'wing' or 'fin', pl.: pinnae), a term that is used more in zoology.

== Structure ==
The diagram shows the shape and location of most of these components:

- antihelix forms a 'Y' shape where the upper parts are:
  - Superior crus (to the left of the fossa triangularis in the diagram)
  - Inferior crus (to the right of the fossa triangularis in the diagram)
- Antitragus is below the tragus
- Aperture is the entrance to the ear canal
- Auricular sulcus is the depression behind the ear next to the head
- Concha is the hollow next to the ear canal
- Conchal angle is the angle that the back of the concha makes with the side of the head
- Crus of the helix is just above the tragus
- Cymba conchae is the narrowest end of the concha
- External auditory meatus is the ear canal
- Fossa triangularis is the depression in the fork of the antihelix
- Helix is the folded over outside edge of the ear
- Incisura anterior auris, or intertragic incisure, or intertragal notch, is the space between the tragus and antitragus
- Lobe (lobule)
- Scapha, the depression or groove between the helix and the anthelix
- Tragus

=== Development ===
The developing auricle is first noticeable around the sixth week of gestation in the human fetus, developing from the auricular hillocks, which are derived from the first and second pharyngeal arches. These hillocks develop into the folds of the auricle and gradually shift upwards and backwards to their final position on the head. En route accessory auricles (also known as preauricular tags) may be left behind. The first three hillocks are derived from the 1st branchial arch and form the tragus, crus of the helix, and helix, respectively. Cutaneous sensation to these areas is via the trigeminal nerve, the attendant nerve of the 1st branchial arch. The final three hillocks are derived from the second branchial arch and form the antihelix, antitragus, and lobule, respectively. These portions of the ear are supplied by the cervical plexus and a small portion by the facial nerve. This explains why vesicles are classically seen on the auricle in herpes infections of the facial nerve (Ramsay Hunt syndrome type II).

The auricle's functions are to collect sound and transform it into directional and other information. The auricle collects sound and, like a funnel, amplifies the sound and directs it to the auditory canal. The filtering effect of the human pinnae preferentially selects sounds in the frequency range of human speech.

=== Amplification and modulation ===
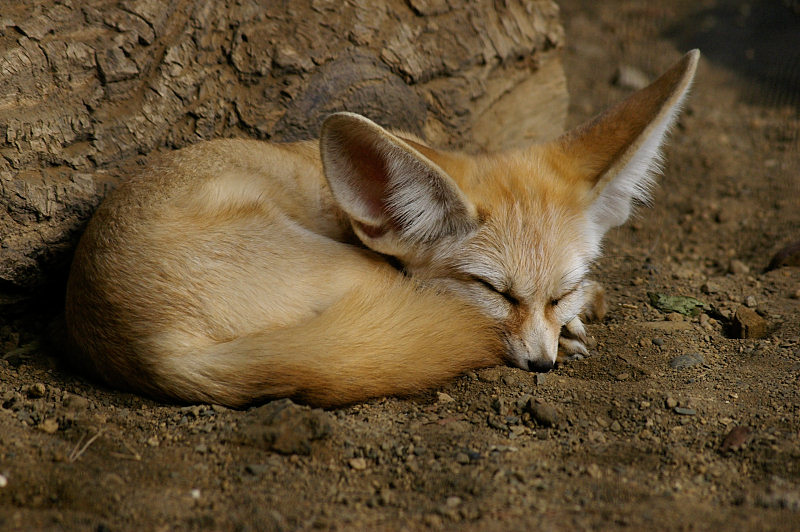
The fennec fox uses its distinctive oversized pinnae to radiate excess heat and to amplify the sound of small prey burrowing under the desert sand.

Amplification of sound by the pinna, tympanic membrane and middle ear causes an increase in level of about 10 to 15 dB in a frequency range of 1.5 kHz to 7 kHz. This amplification is an important factor in inner ear trauma resulting from elevated sound levels.

Non-electrical hearing apparatuses which were designed to protect hearing (particularly that of musicians and others who work in loud environments) which fit snugly in the concha have been studied by the Institute of Sound and Vibration Research (ISVR) at the University of Southampton in the U.K.

=== Notch of pinna ===
Due to its anatomy, the pinna largely eliminates a small segment of the frequency spectrum; this band is called the pinna notch. The pinna works differently for low and high frequency sounds. For low frequencies, it behaves similarly to a reflector dish, directing sounds toward the ear canal. For high frequencies, however, its value is thought to be more sophisticated. While some of the sounds that enter the ear travel directly to the canal, others reflect off the contours of the pinna first: these enter the ear canal after a very slight delay. This delay causes phase cancellation, virtually eliminating the frequency component whose wave period is twice the delay period. Neighboring frequencies also drop significantly. In the affected frequency band – the pinna notch – the pinna creates a band-stop or notch filtering effect. This filter typically affects sounds around 10 kHz, though it can affect any frequencies from 6 – 16 kHz. It also is directionally dependent, affecting sounds coming from above more than those coming from straight ahead. This aids in vertical sound localization.

== Functions ==
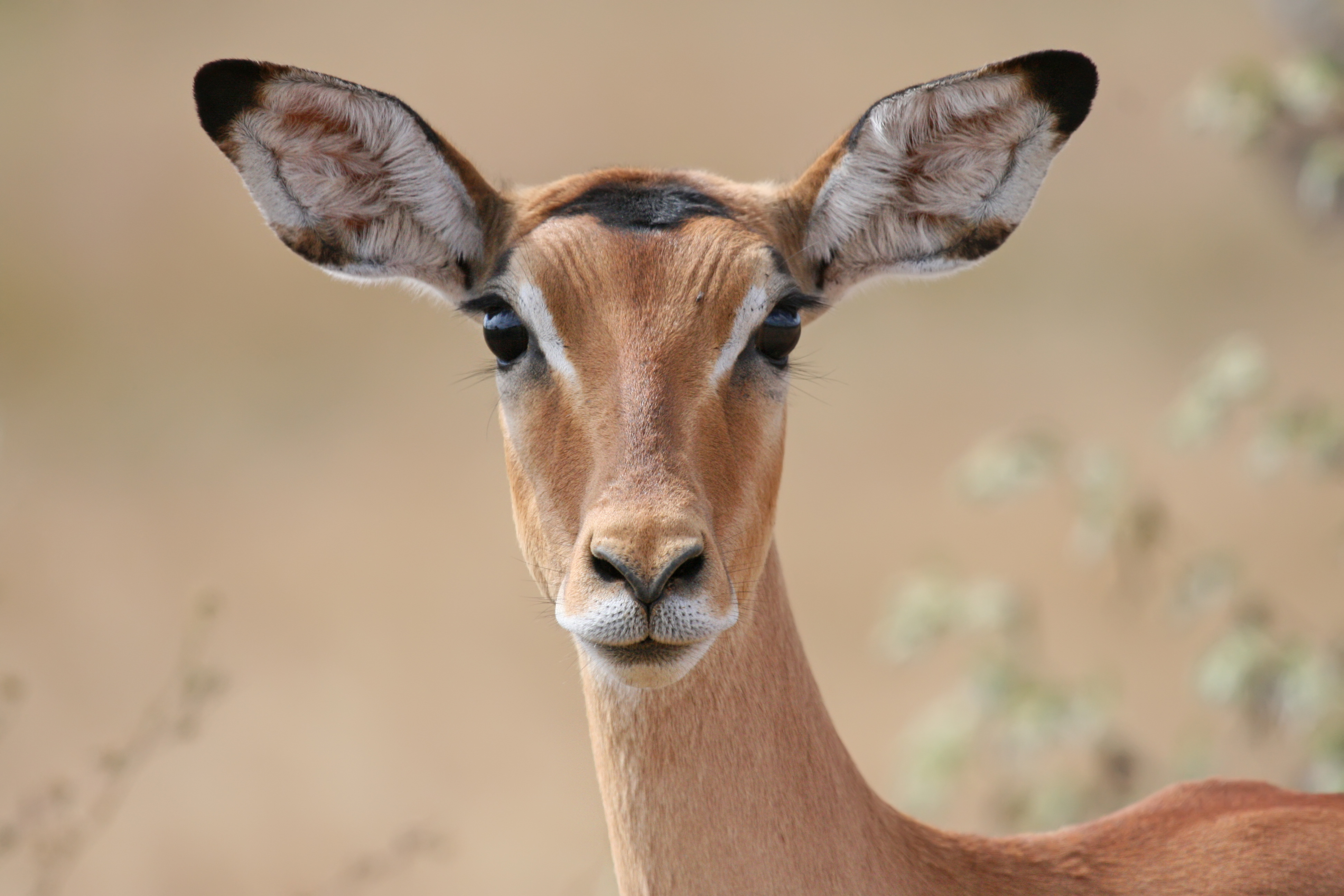
To an impala, the pinna is useful in collecting sound.

In animals, the function of the pinna is to collect sound, and perform spectral transformations to incoming sounds which enable the process of vertical localization to take place. It collects sound by acting as a funnel, amplifying the sound and directing it to the auditory canal. While reflecting from the pinna, sound also goes through a filtering process, as well as frequency dependent amplitude modulation which adds directional information to the sound (see sound localization, head-related transfer function, pinna notch). In various species, the pinna can also signal mood and radiate heat.

== Clinical significance ==
There are various visible ear abnormalities:

- traumatic injury
- infection
- wart, mole, birthmark
- scars, including keloids
- cyst
- skin tag
- sunburn, frostbite
- pressure ulcer, often from a poorly fitting hearing aid
- anotia, absent pinna
- microtia, underdeveloped pinna
- cryptotia, a pinna covered beneath the skin of the scalp
- Stahl's deformity, pointed pinna due to an extra fold of cartilage
- cupped or constricted ear deformity, a hooded superior helix
- preauricular pit
- preauricular tag
- Darwin's tubercle, protuberance on the anterior helix
- hypertrichosis, including hypertrichosis lanuginosa acquisita, a hairy pinna
- cauliflower ear, post-traumatic cartilage deformity
- tophus, nodule on the pinna related to gout
- chondrodermatitis nodularis chronica helicis (Winkler's nodule), a nodule initiated by solar damage
- actinic keratosis and cutaneous horn, premalignant lesions caused by solar damage
- benign and malignant neoplasm, including tumors, keratoacanthoma, carcinoma

== In other species ==
Visible pinnae are a common trait in therian mammals (placentals and marsupials), but are poorly developed or absent in monotremes. Marine mammals usually have either reduced pinnae or no pinnae due to sound travelling differently in water than in air, as well as the fact that auricles would potentially slow them down in the water. Skin impressions show large, mouse-like pinnae in Spinolestes.

External pinnae are absent in other tetrapod groups such as reptiles, amphibians, and birds.

== Additional images ==
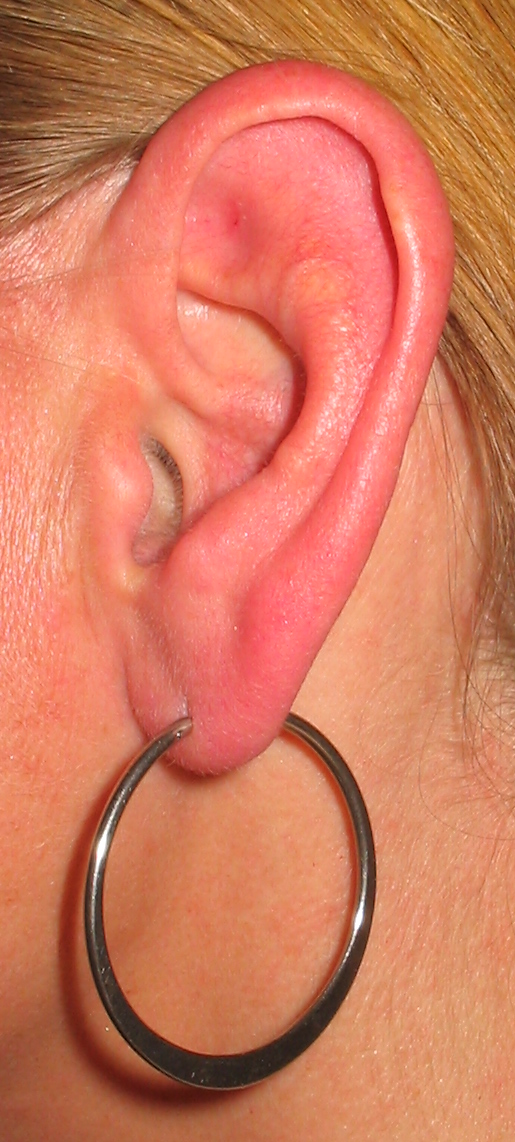
Left human auricle

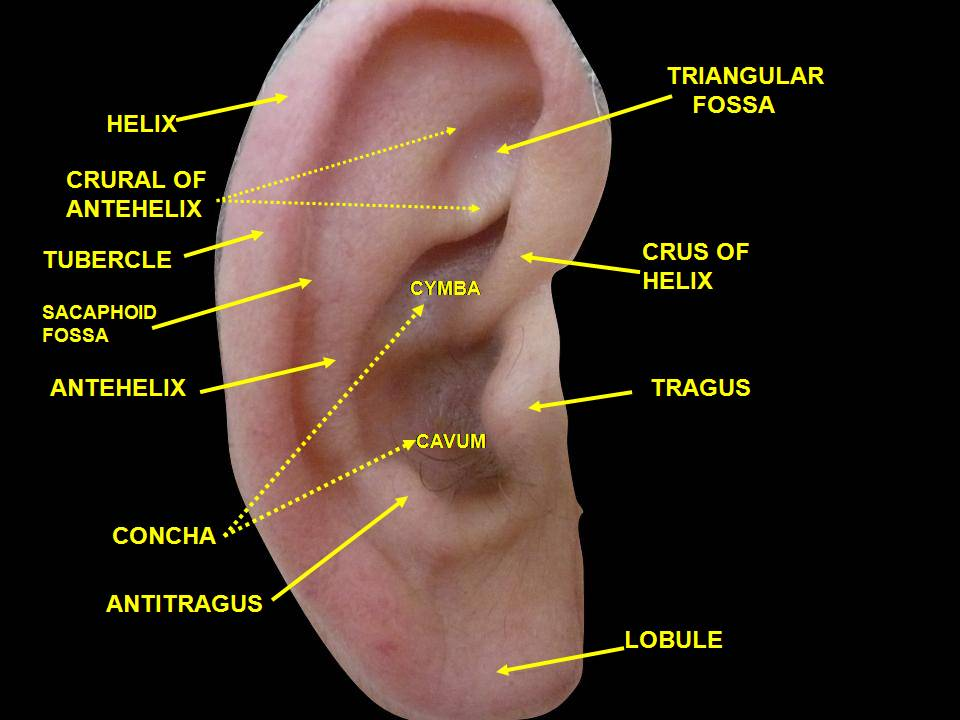
External ear. Right auricle. Lateral view.

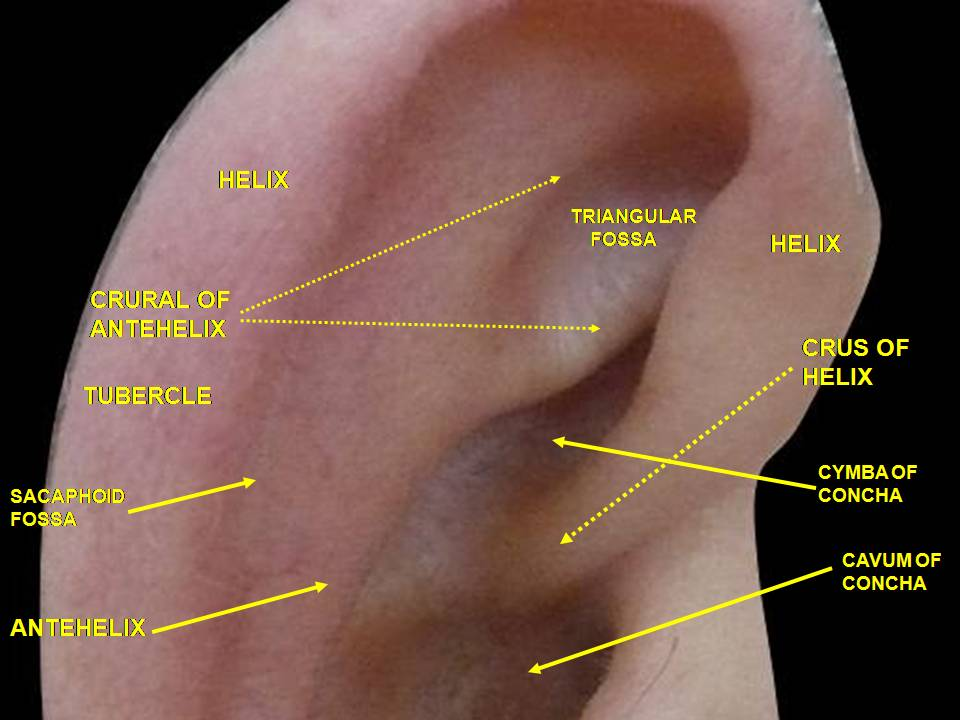
External ear. Right auricle. Lateral view.

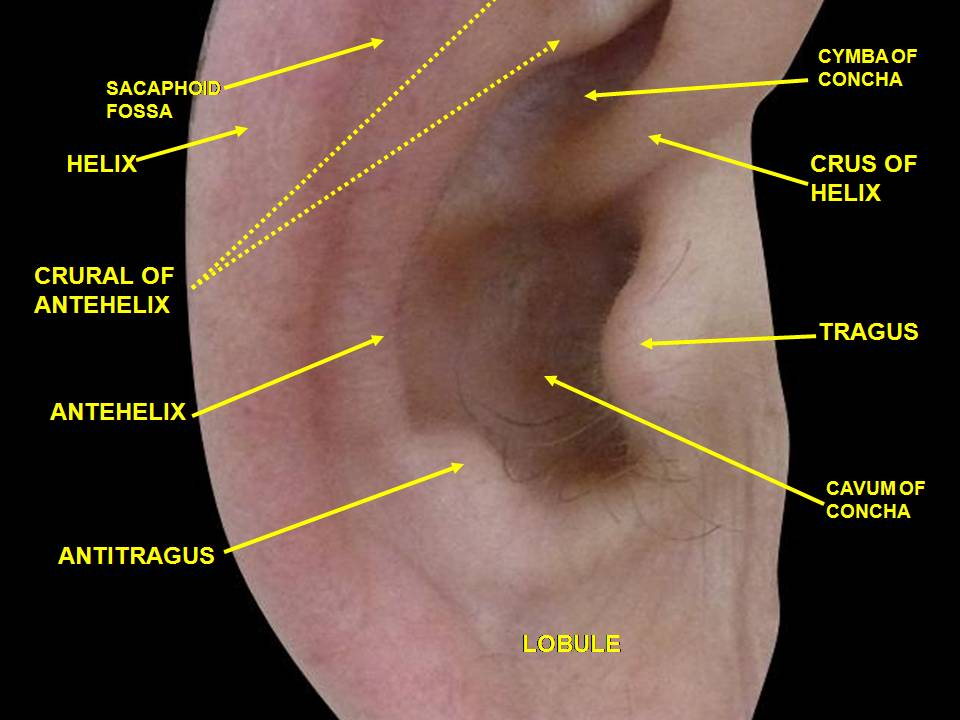
External ear. Right auricle. Lateral view.

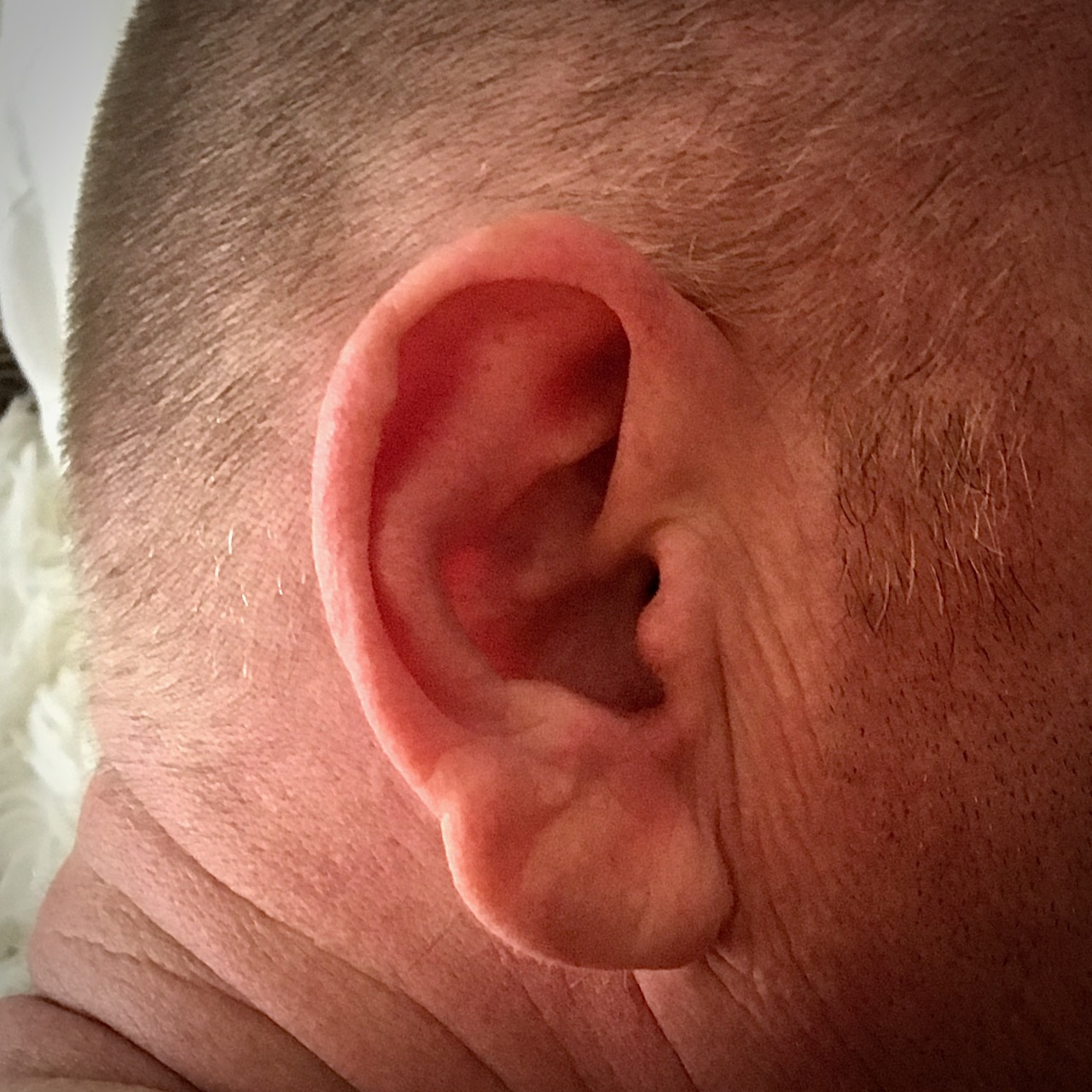
Male right auricle

== See also ==
- Earrings for pierced ears
- Auriculotherapy
