= Antihelix =

Part of the visible ear

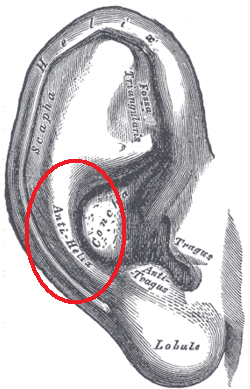
- The auricula. Lateral surface.

Identifiers
- TA98: A15.3.01.009
- TA2: 109
- FMA: 60995

The antihelix (anthelix) is a part of the visible ear; the pinna. The antihelix is a curved prominence of cartilage parallel with and in front of the helix on the pinna.

The antihelix divides above into two legs or crura; the crura antihelicis, between which is a triangular depression, the fossa triangularis.

== Additional images ==
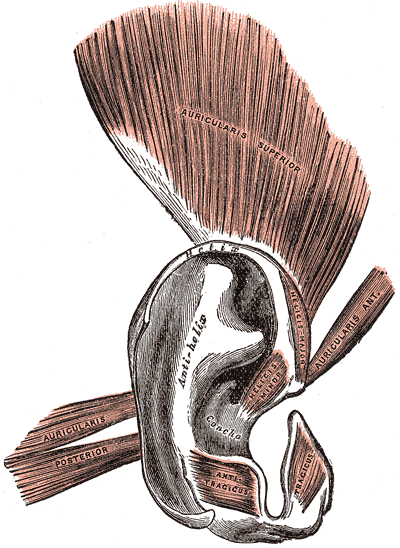
The muscles of the auricula.

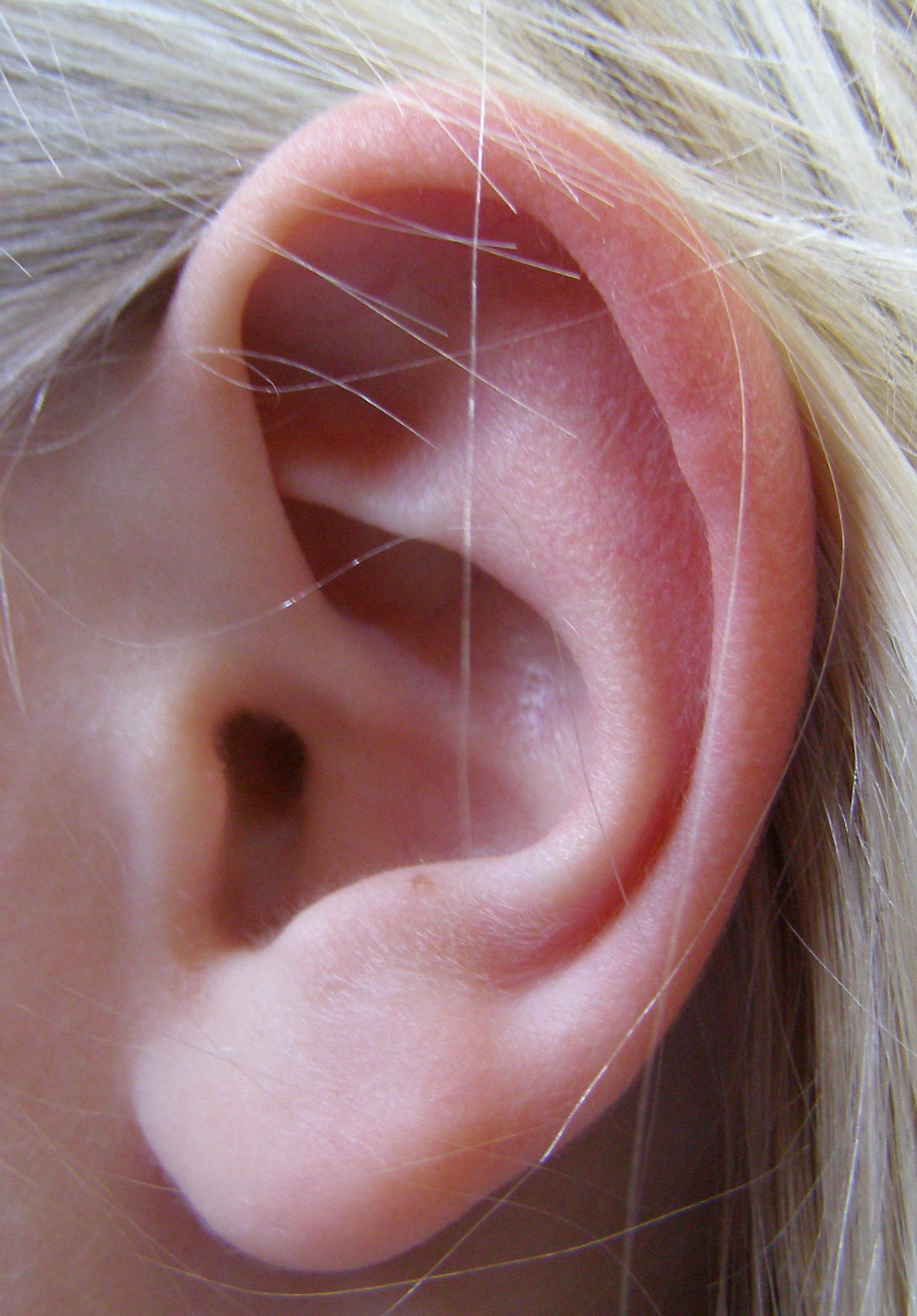
Left human ear

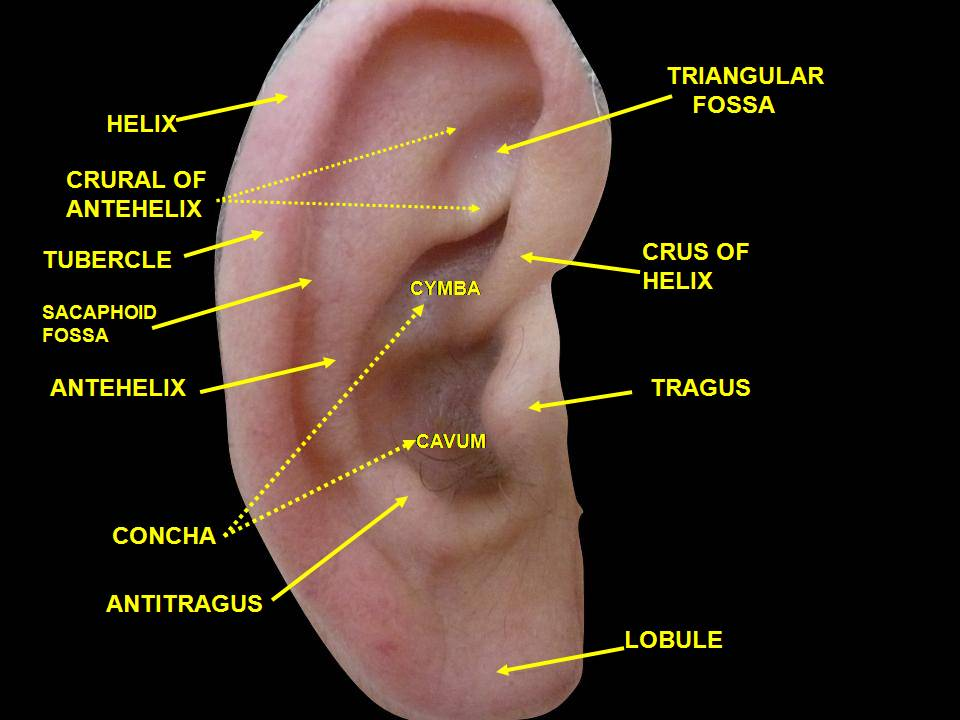
External ear. Right auricle. Lateral view.

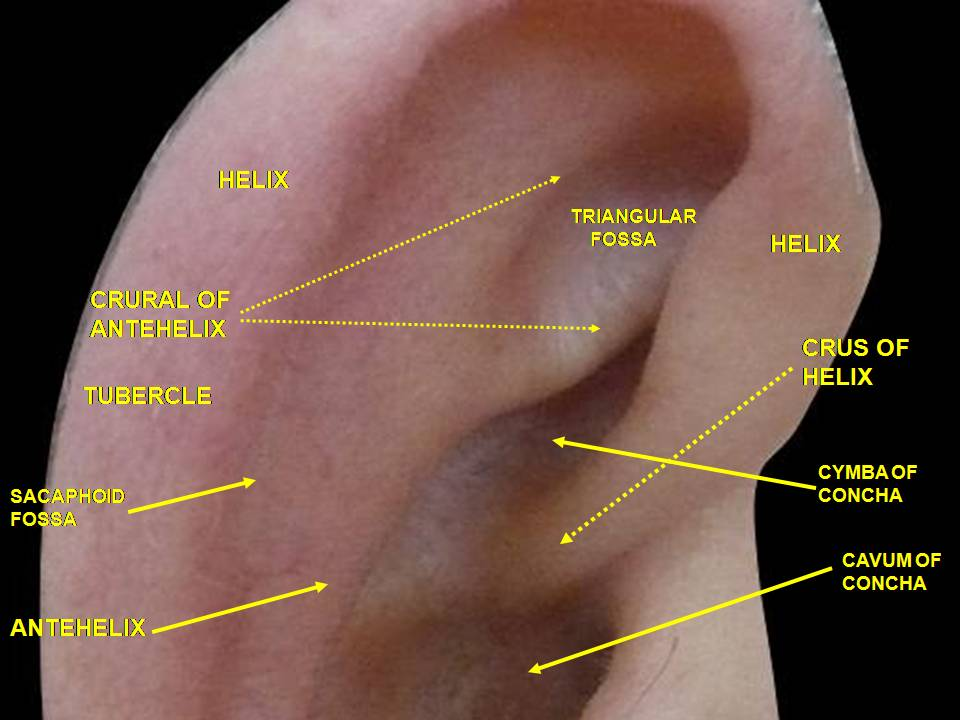
External ear. Right auricle. Lateral view.

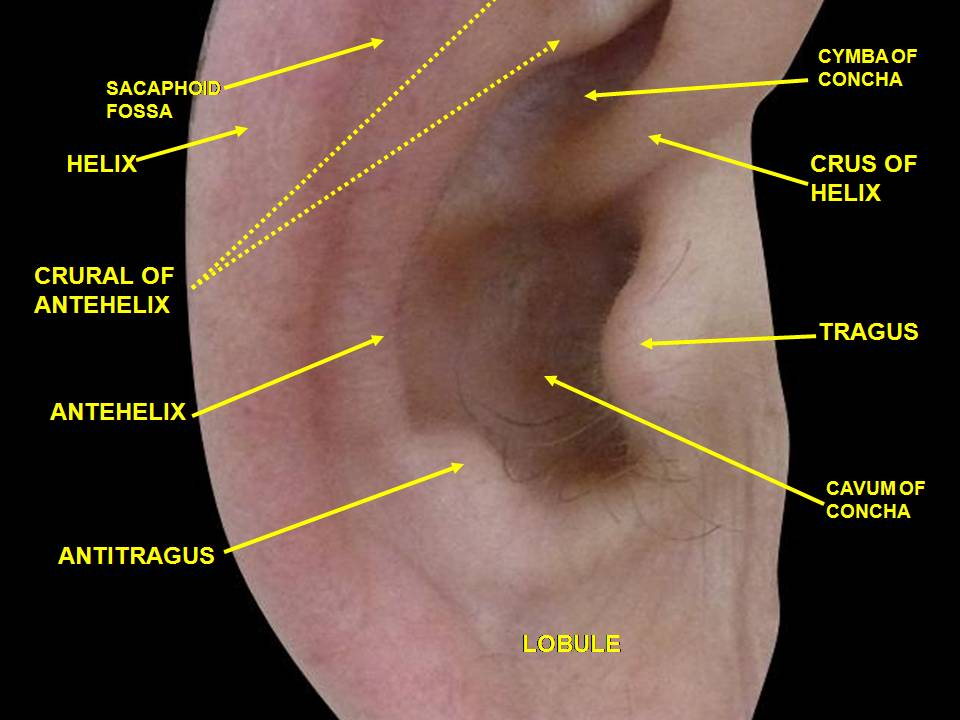
External ear. Right auricle. Lateral view.
