= Facial Action Coding System =

System of classifying human facial movements

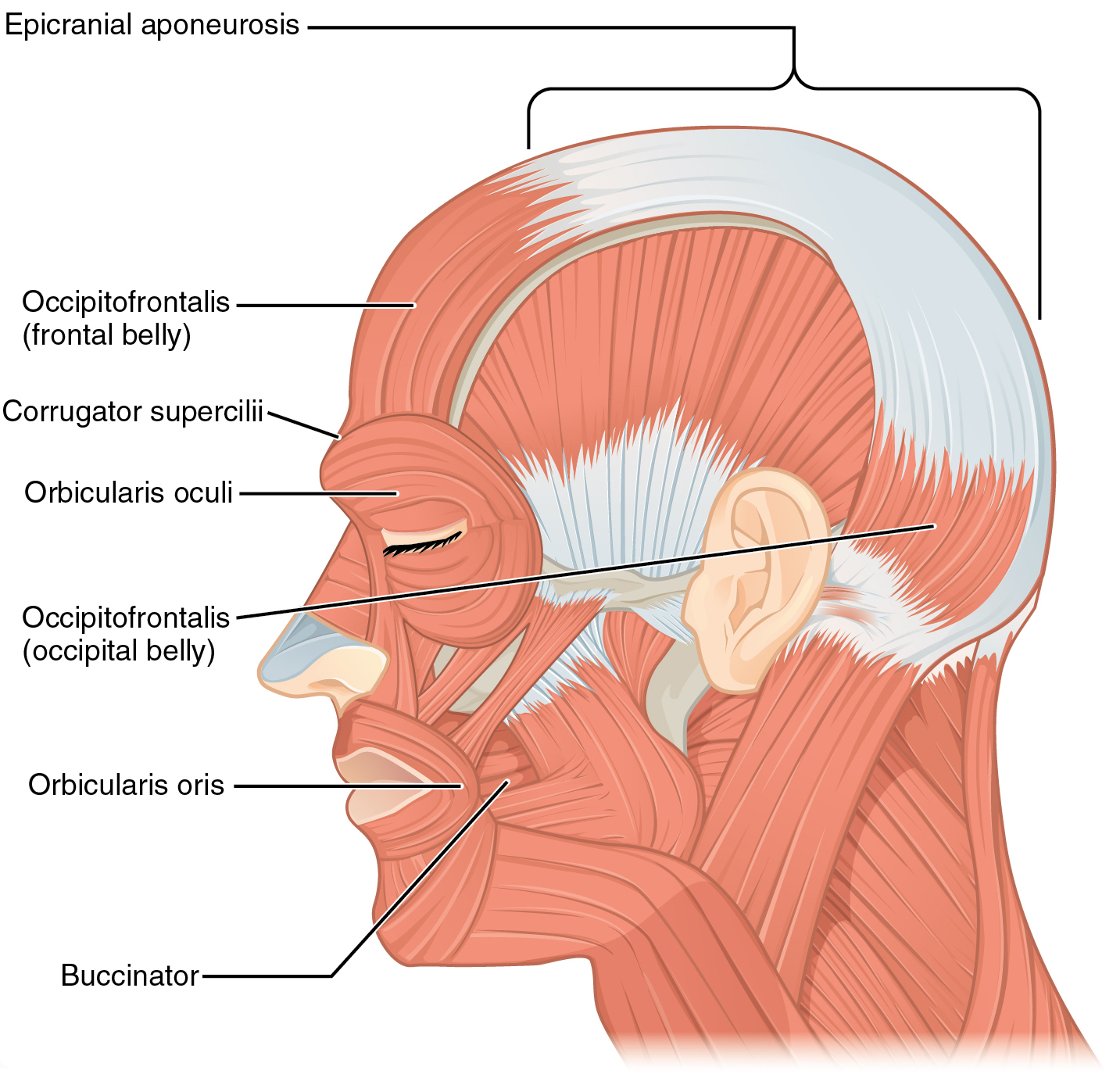
Muscles of head and neck

The Facial Action Coding System (FACS) is a system to taxonomize human facial movements by their appearance on the face, based on a system originally developed by a Swedish anatomist named Carl-Herman Hjortsjö. It was later adopted by Paul Ekman and Wallace V. Friesen, and published in 1978. Ekman, Friesen, and Joseph C. Hager published a significant update to FACS in 2002. Movements of individual facial muscles are encoded by the FACS from slight different instant changes in facial appearance. It has proven useful to psychologists and to animators.

== Method ==
Using the FACS, human coders can manually code nearly any anatomically possible facial expression, deconstructing it into the specific "action units" (AU) and their temporal segments that produced the expression. As AUs are independent of any interpretation, they can be used for any higher-order decision-making process including recognition of basic emotions, or pre-programmed commands for an ambient intelligent environment. The FACS manual is over five hundred pages in length and provides the AUs, as well as Ekman's interpretation of their meanings.

The FACS defines AUs as contractions or relaxations of one or more muscles. It also defines a number of "action descriptors", which differ from AUs in that the authors of the FACS have not specified the muscular basis for the action and have not distinguished specific behaviors as precisely as they have for the AUs.

For example, the FACS can be used to distinguish two types of smiles as follows:

- the insincere and voluntary Pan-Am smile: contraction of zygomatic major alone
- the sincere and involuntary Duchenne smile: contraction of zygomatic major and inferior part of orbicularis oculi.

The FACS is designed to be self-instructional. People can learn the technique from a number of sources including manuals and workshops, and obtain certification through testing.

Although the labeling of expressions currently requires trained experts, researchers have had some success in using computers to automatically identify the FACS codes. One obstacle to automatic FACS code recognition is a shortage of manually coded ground truth data.

== Uses ==
=== Baby FACS ===
Baby FACS (Facial Action Coding System for Infants and Young Children) is a behavioral coding system that adapts the adult FACS to code facial expressions in infants aged 0–2 years. It corresponds to specific underlying facial muscles, tailored to infant facial anatomy and expression patterns.

It was created by Dr. Harriet Oster and colleagues to address the limitations of applying adult FACS directly to infants, whose facial musculature, proportions and developmental capabilities differ significantly.

=== Use in medicine ===
The use of the FACS has been proposed for use in the analysis of depression, and the measurement of pain in patients unable to express themselves verbally.

=== Interspecial applications ===
The original FACS has been modified to analyze facial movements in several non-human primates, namely chimpanzees, rhesus macaques, gibbons, and siamangs, and orangutans. More recently, it was developed also for domesticated species, including dogs, horses and cats. Similarly to the human FACS, the non-human FACS has manuals available online for each species with the respective certification tests.

Thus the FACS can be used to compare facial repertoires across species due to its anatomical basis. A study conducted by Vick and others (2006) suggests that the FACS can be modified by taking differences in underlying morphology into account. Such considerations enable a comparison of the homologous facial movements present in humans and chimpanzees, to show that the facial expressions of both species result from extremely notable appearance changes. The development of FACS tools for different species allows the objective and anatomical study of facial expressions in communicative and emotional contexts. Furthermore, an interspecial analysis of facial expressions can help to answer interesting questions, such as which emotions are uniquely human.

The Emotional Facial Action Coding System (EMFACS) and the Facial Action Coding System Affect Interpretation Dictionary (FACSAID) consider only emotion-related facial actions. Examples of these are:

Emotion	Action units
Happiness	6+12
Sadness	1+4+15
Surprise	1+2+5B+26
Fear	1+2+4+5+7+20+26
Anger	4+5+7+23
Disgust	9+15+17
Contempt	R12A+R14A

=== Computer-generated imagery ===
FACS coding is also used extensively in computer animation, in particular for computer facial animation, with facial expressions being expressed as vector graphics of A.Us. FACS vectors are used as weights for blend shapes corresponding to each AU, with the resulting face mesh then being used to render the finished face. Deep-learning techniques can be used to determine the FACS vectors from face images obtained during motion capture acting, facial motion capture or other performances.

== Codes for action units ==
For clarification, the FACS is an index of facial expressions, but does not actually provide any biomechanical information about the degree of muscle activation. Though muscle activation is not part of the FACS, the main muscles involved in the facial expression have been added here.

Action units (AUs) are the fundamental actions of individual muscles or groups of muscles.

Action descriptors (ADs) are unitary movements that may involve the actions of several muscle groups (e.g., a forward‐thrusting movement of the jaw). The muscular basis for these actions has not been specified and specific behaviors have not been distinguished as precisely as for the AUs.

For the most accurate annotation, the FACS suggests agreement from at least two independent certified FACS encoders.

=== Intensity scoring ===
Intensities of the FACS are annotated by appending letters A–E (for minimal-maximal intensity) to the action unit number (e.g. AU 1A is the weakest trace of AU 1 and AU 1E is the maximum intensity possible for the individual person).

- A Trace
- B Slight
- C Marked or pronounced
- D Severe or extreme
- E Maximum

=== Other letter modifiers ===
There are other modifiers present in FACS codes for emotional expressions, such as "R" which represents an action that occurs on the right side of the face and "L" for actions which occur on the left. An action which is unilateral (occurs on only one side of the face) but has no specific side is indicated with a "U" and an action which is bilateral but has a stronger side is indicated with an "A" for "asymmetric".

=== List of AUs and ADs (with underlying facial muscles) ===
==== Main codes ====
AU number	FACS name	Muscular basis
0	Neutral face	
1	Inner brow raiser	frontalis (pars medialis)
2	Outer brow raiser	frontalis (pars lateralis)
4	Brow lowerer	depressor glabellae, depressor supercilii, corrugator supercilii
5	Upper lid raiser	levator palpebrae superioris, superior tarsal muscle
6	Cheek raiser	orbicularis oculi (pars orbitalis)
7	Lid tightener	orbicularis oculi (pars palpebralis)
8	Lips toward each other	orbicularis oris
9	Nose wrinkler	levator labii superioris alaeque nasi
10	Upper lip raiser	levator labii superioris, caput infraorbitalis
11	Nasolabial deepener	zygomaticus minor
12	Lip corner puller	zygomaticus major
13	Sharp lip puller	levator anguli oris (also known as caninus)
14	Dimpler	buccinator
15	Lip corner depressor	depressor anguli oris (also known as triangularis)
16	Lower lip depressor	depressor labii inferioris
17	Chin raiser	mentalis
18	Lip pucker	incisivii labii superioris and incisivii labii inferioris
19	Tongue show	
20	Lip stretcher	risorius with platysma
21	Neck tightener	platysma]
22	Lip funneler	orbicularis oris
23	Lip tightener	orbicularis oris
24	Lip pressor	orbicularis oris
25	Lips part	depressor labii inferioris, or relaxation of mentalis or orbicularis oris
26	Jaw drop	masseter; relaxed temporalis and internal pterygoid
27	Mouth stretch	pterygoids, digastric
28	Lip suck	orbicularis oris

==== Head movement codes ====
AU number	FACS name	Action
51	Head turn left	
52	Head turn right	
53	Head up	
54	Head down	
55	Head tilt left	
M55	Head tilt left	The onset of the symmetrical 14 is immediately preceded or accompanied by a head tilt to the left.
56	Head tilt right	
M56	Head tilt right	The onset of the symmetrical 14 is immediately preceded or accompanied by a head tilt to the right.
57	Head forward	
M57	Head thrust forward	The onset of 17+24 is immediately preceded, accompanied, or followed by a head thrust forward.
58	Head back	
M59	Head shake up and down	The onset of 17+24 is immediately preceded, accompanied, or followed by an up-down head shake (nod).
M60	Head shake side to side	The onset of 17+24 is immediately preceded, accompanied, or followed by a side to side head shake.
M83	Head upward and to the side	The onset of the symmetrical 14 is immediately preceded or accompanied by a movement of the head, upward and turned or tilted to either the left or right.

==== Eye movement codes ====
AU number	FACS name	Action
61	Eyes turn left	
M61	Eyes left	The onset of the symmetrical 14 is immediately preceded or accompanied by eye movement to the left.
62	Eyes turn right	
M62	Eyes right	The onset of the symmetrical 14 is immediately preceded or accompanied by eye movement to the right.
63	Eyes up	
64	Eyes down	
65	Walleye	
66	Cross-eye	
M68	Upward rolling of eyes	The onset of the symmetrical 14 is immediately preceded or accompanied by an upward rolling of the eyes.
69	Eyes positioned to look at other person	The 4, 5, or 7, alone or in combination, occurs while the eye position is fixed on the other person in the conversation.
M69	Head or eyes look at other person	The onset of the symmetrical 14 or AUs 4, 5, and 7, alone or in combination, is immediately preceded or accompanied by a movement of the eyes or of the head and eyes to look at the other person in the conversation.

==== Visibility codes ====
AU number	FACS name
70	Brows and forehead not visible
71	Eyes not visible
72	Lower face not visible
73	Entire face not visible
74	Unscorable

==== Gross behavior codes ====
These codes are reserved for recording information about gross behaviors that may be relevant to the facial actions that are scored.

AU number	FACS name	Muscular basis
29	Jaw thrust	
30	Jaw sideways	
31	Jaw clencher	masseter
32	[Lip] bite	
33	[Cheek] blow	
34	[Cheek] puff	
35	[Cheek] suck	
36	[Tongue] bulge	
37	Lip wipe	
38	Nostril dilator	nasalis (pars alaris)
39	Nostril compressor	nasalis (pars transversa) and depressor septi nasi
40	Sniff	
41	Lid droop	levator palpebrae superioris (relaxation)
42	Slit	orbicularis oculi muscle
43	Eyes closed	relaxation of levator palpebrae superioris
44	Squint	corrugator supercilii and orbicularis oculi muscle
45	Blink	relaxation of levator palpebrae superioris; contraction of orbicularis oculi (pars palpebralis)
46	Wink	orbicularis oculi
50	Speech	
80	Swallow	
81	Chewing	
82	Shoulder shrug	
84	Head shake back and forth	
85	Head nod up and down	
91	Flash	
92	Partial flash	
97*	Shiver/tremble	
98*	Fast up-down look	

== See also ==
- Computer facial animation
- Emotion classification
- Facial electromyography
- Facial feedback hypothesis
- Facial muscles
- Microexpression
