= Frown =

Facial expression

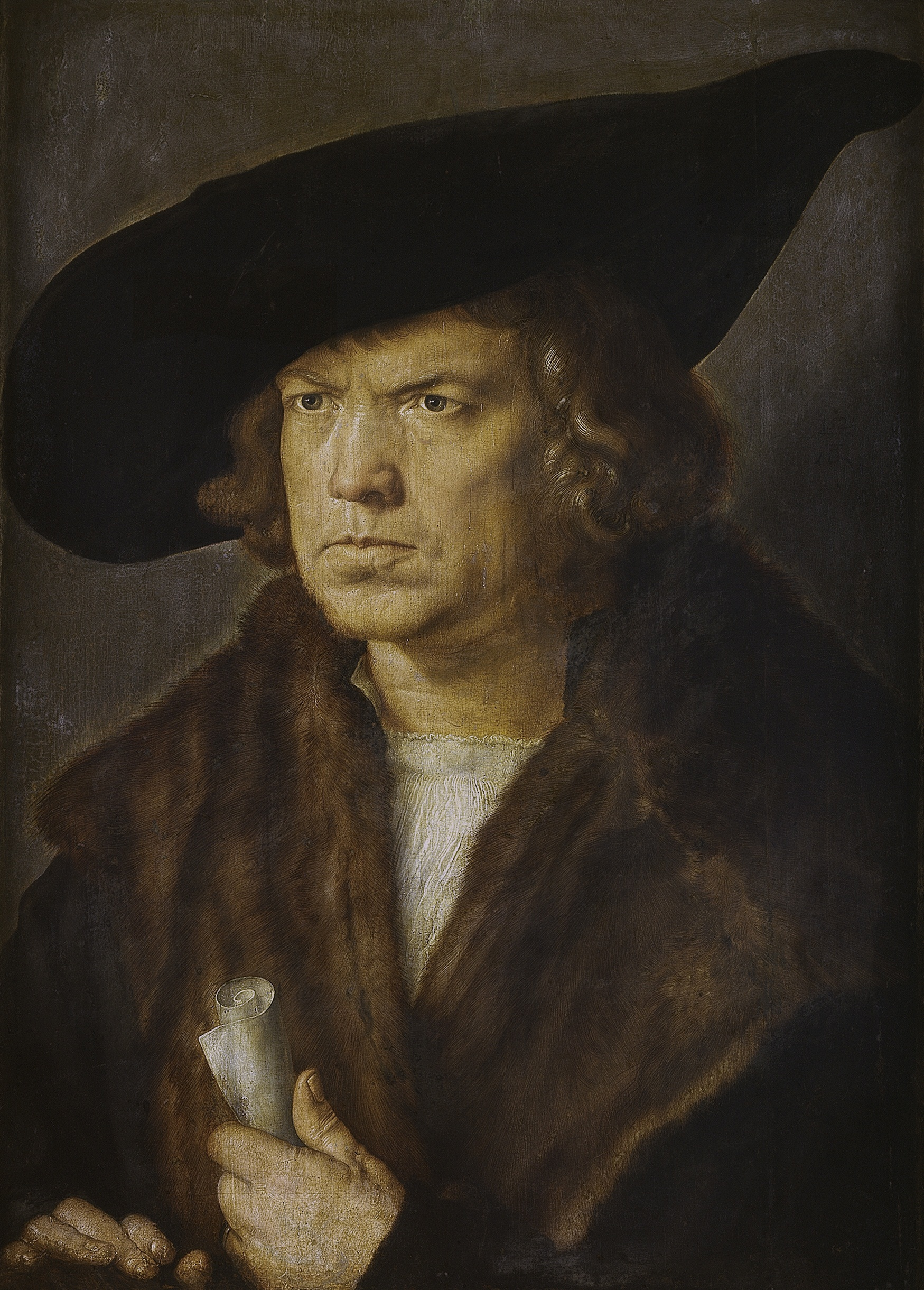
In his 16th-century portrait of an unidentified man, Albrecht Dürer powerfully captures personality through facial expression, body language, and clothing. Work: Bildnis eines unbekannten Mannes (1521)

A frown (also known as a scowl) is a facial expression in which the eyebrows are brought together, and the forehead is wrinkled, usually indicating displeasure, sadness or worry, or less often confusion or concentration. The appearance of a frown varies by culture. An alternative usage in North America is thought of as an expression of the mouth. In those cases when used iconically, as with an emoticon, it is entirely presented by the curve of the lips forming a down-open curve. The mouth expression is also commonly referred to in the colloquial English phrase, especially in the United States, to "turn that frown upside down" which indicates changing from sad to happy.

== Description ==
Charles Darwin described the primary act of frowning as the furrowing of the brow which leads to a rise in the upper lip and a down-turning of the corners of the mouth. While the appearance of a frown varies from culture to culture, there appears to be some degree of universality to the recognition of the frown as a negative facial expression. In fact, frowning as a component of anger or disgust is widely recognized as a universal expression easily recognized across cultures. This universality suggests a shared adaptive quality to frowning allowing for social communication of negative emotional states.

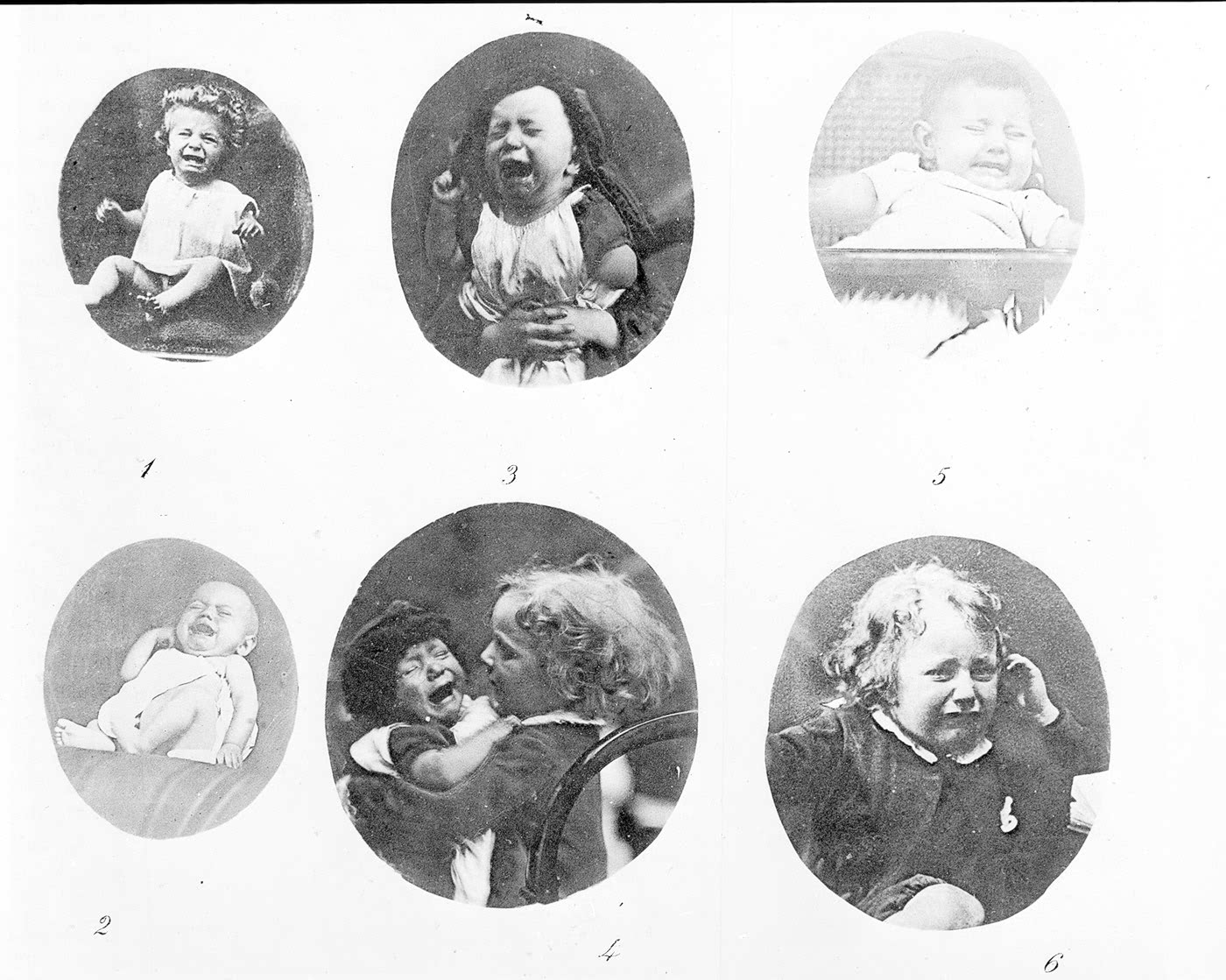
Photographs of frowning and crying children from The Expression of the Emotions in Man and Animals (1872) by Charles Darwin

Scott Fahlman first suggested the use of the colon with the left parenthesis to iconically represent a frowning face on the Internet in what has become a well-known emoticon. In this form the frown is entirely presented as a curve of the lips facing away from the eyes. Specifically, frowns that incorporate the furrowing of the brow are a response to perceived obstacles to the achievement of goals, while frowns that involve movement of the cheeks reflect an unpleasant reaction. Just as smiling alone can make one feel better, frowning can make one feel worse. In a scientific study participants who held their faces in a frown ranked images as more unpleasant than participants who viewed the images with a neutral facial expression. In a similar test, participants reported increased anger with the manipulated expression of a frown and they also ranked cartoons they saw as less funny than participants with the manipulated expression of a smile.

== Social behavior ==
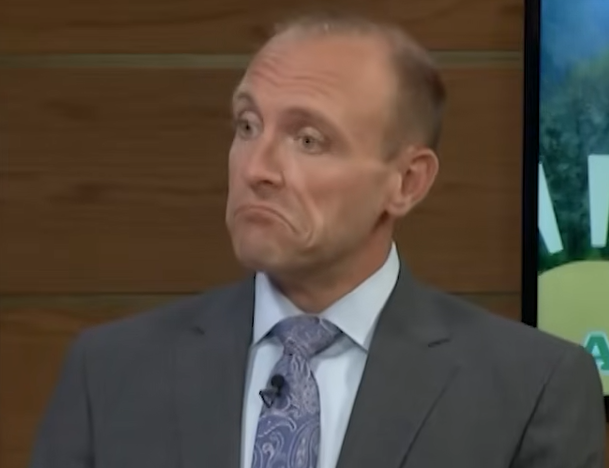
An example of a spontaneous frown used to express displeasure.

In social settings frowns are most frequently used to express a range of negative emotions including anger and displeasure. However there are social differences that dictate who is allowed to frown in any given social setting. Socially dominant individuals are more likely to frown than those of a lower social status. Individuals with a high social status are permitted to display their emotions more freely, while low dominance individuals are expected to show signs of affiliation. It is considered more socially acceptable for men to display negative emotions than women; women also tend to be less likely to frown than men. Unlike smiling, frowns do not appear to be directly socially contagious; seeing someone frown does not necessarily make you frown. However, in a scientific study participants that were subliminally exposed to frowning faces, were more likely to react with a frown when later shown a neutral face. Frowns can also increase counter-empathy reactions. When the loser of a competition frowns it increases brain responses associated with pleasure in the winner, which is possibly related to the feeling of schadenfreude experienced when witnessing the misfortune of others. Frowns also contribute to impressions formed even during brief encounters with other individuals. When shown a 30-second video clip (without audio) of a frowning college professor, students tend to rate the professor poorly on evaluations.

== Muscles used ==
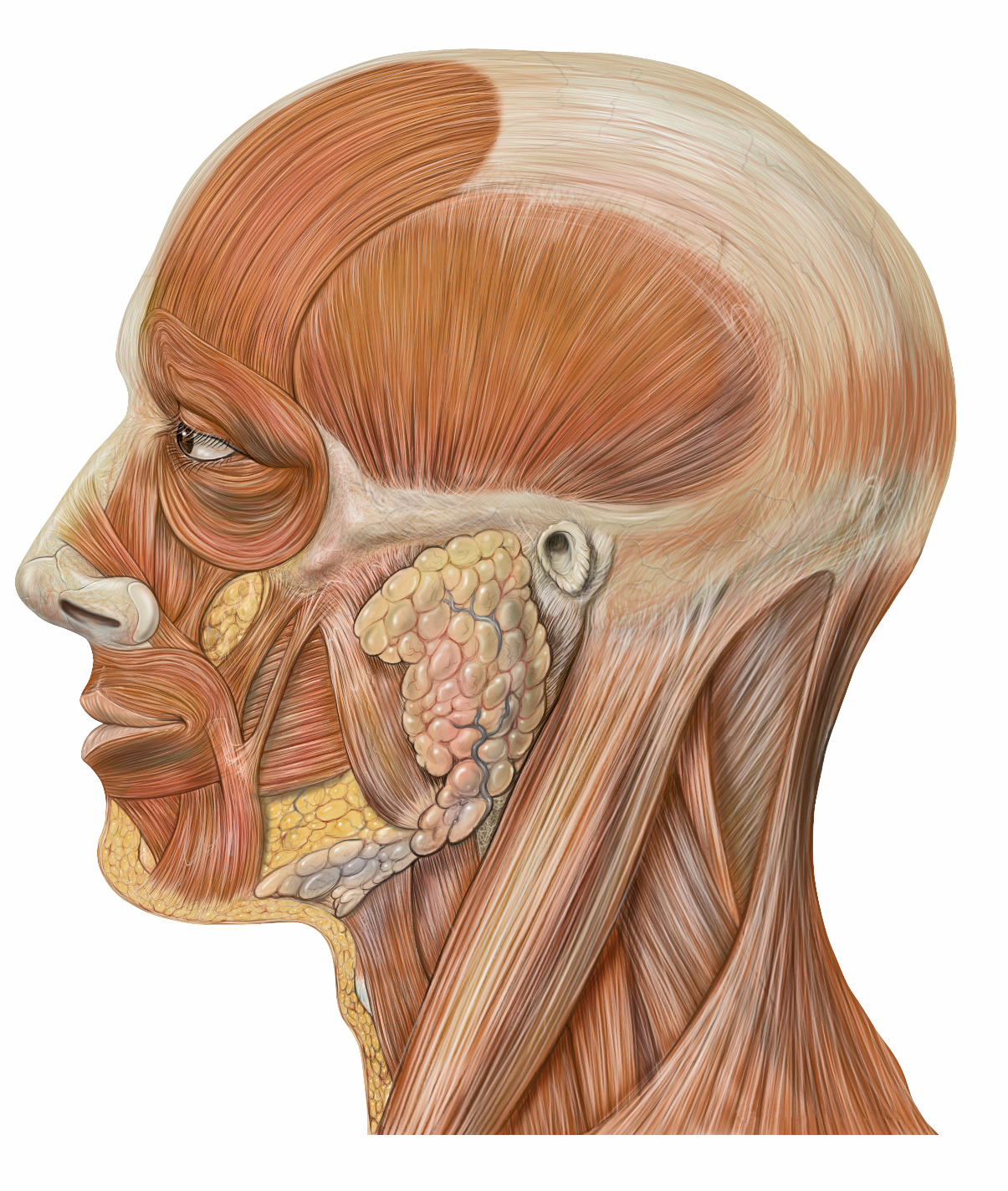
Illustration of facial muscles and other tissue of the lateral human head and neck

It is a long-held belief that it takes more muscles to frown than it does to smile. It is difficult to determine exactly how many muscles are involved in smiling or frowning as there is a wide range of facial expressions that might be considered a frown or a smile. At minimum ten muscles are required to smile in which only the upper lip and corners of the mouth are lifted. A similarly minimal frown requires only six muscles to lower the corners of the mouth. According to plastic surgeon Dr. David H. Song of the University of Chicago Medical Center, however, frowning requires 11 muscles while smiling requires 12. This method of counting the number of muscles used in generating a facial expression does not take into account the energy consumed by each muscle or the individual variability in facial muscles. While humans share facial musculature to express the universal emotions, some humans have more muscles in their faces and may use more of them when smiling or frowning.

Muscles of facial expression
Frowning	Smiling
Platysma (2 muscles)	Zygomaticus major (2 muscles)
Orbicularis oculi (2 muscles)	Orbicularis oculi (2 muscles)
Corrugator supercilii (2 muscles)	Levator labii superioris (2 muscles)
Procerus (1 muscle)	Levator anguli oris (2 muscles)
Orbicularis oris (1 muscle)	Risorius (2 muscles)
Mentalis (1 muscle)	Zygomaticus minor (2 muscles)
Depressor anguli oris (2 muscles)	
11 muscles total	12 muscles total

== See also ==
- Nonverbal communication
