= Facial muscles =

Muscles of the face

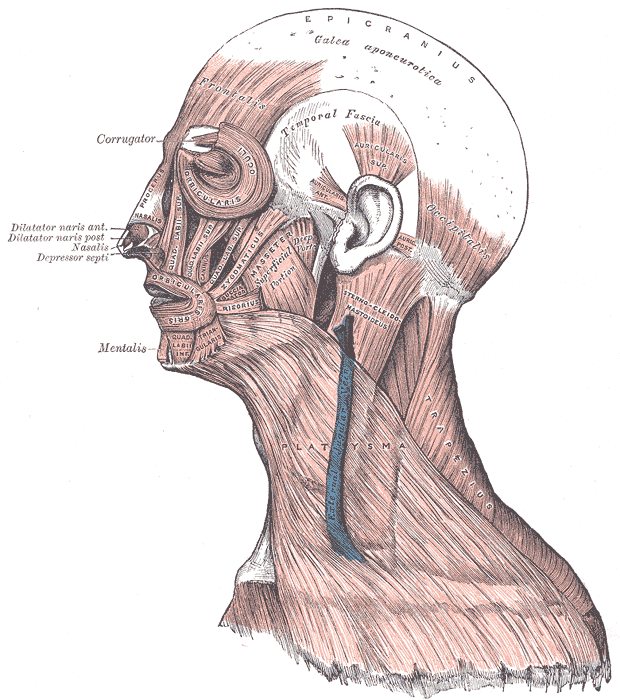
- Head

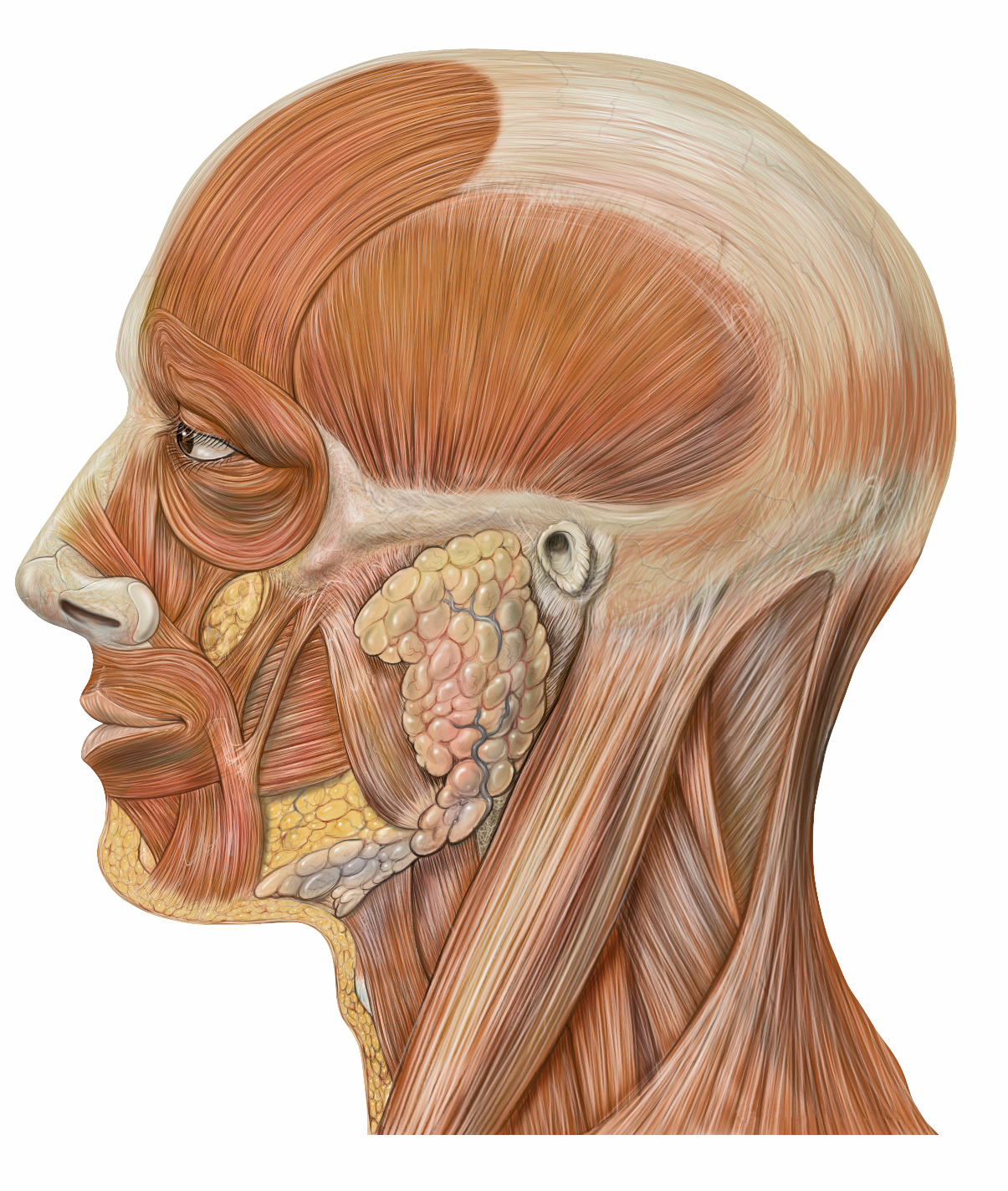
- Lateral head anatomy

Details
- Nerve: facial nerve

Identifiers
- Latin: musculi faciei
- MeSH: D005152
- TA98: A04.1.03.001
- TA2: 2060
- FMA: 71288

The facial muscles are a group of striated skeletal muscles supplied by the facial nerve (cranial nerve VII) that, among other things, control facial expression. These muscles are also called mimetic muscles. They are only found in mammals, although they derive from neural crest cells found in all vertebrates. They are the only muscles that attach to the dermis.

== Structure ==
The facial muscles are just under the skin (subcutaneous) muscles that control facial expression. They generally originate from the surface of the skull bone (rarely the fascia), and insert on the skin of the face. When they contract, the skin moves. These muscles also cause wrinkles at right angles to the muscles’ action line.

=== Nerve supply ===
The facial muscles are supplied by the facial nerve (cranial nerve VII), with each nerve serving one side of the face. In contrast, the nearby masticatory muscles are supplied by the mandibular nerve, a branch of the trigeminal nerve (cranial nerve V).

=== List of muscles ===
The facial muscles include:

- Occipitofrontalis muscle
- Temporoparietalis muscle
- Procerus muscle
- Nasalis muscle
- Depressor septi nasi muscle
- Orbicularis oculi muscle
- Corrugator supercilii muscle
- Depressor supercilii muscle
- Auricular muscles (anterior, superior and posterior)
- Orbicularis oris muscle
- Depressor anguli oris muscle
- Risorius
- Zygomaticus major muscle
- Zygomaticus minor muscle
- Levator labii superioris
- Levator labii superioris alaeque nasi muscle
- Depressor labii inferioris muscle
- Levator anguli oris
- Buccinator muscle
- Mentalis

The platysma muscle is supplied by the facial nerve. Although it is mostly in the neck and can be grouped with the neck muscles by location, it can be considered a muscle of facial expression due to its common nerve supply.

The stylohyoid muscle, stapedius and posterior belly of the digastric muscle are also supplied by the facial nerve, but are not considered muscles of facial expression.

=== Facial muscles by type of movement ===
Movement	Target	Target motion or direction	Prime mover	Origin	Insertion
Raising eyebrows (e.g., showing surprise)	Skin of scalp	Anterior	Occipitofrontalis frontal belly	Epicraneal aponeurosis	Underneath skin of forehead
Tensing and retracting scalp	Skin of scalp	Posterior	Occipitofrontalis, occipital belly	Occipital bone; mastoid process (temporal bone)	Epicraneal aponeurosis
Lowering eyebrows (e.g., scowling, frowning)	Skin underneath eyebrows	Inferior	Corrugator supercilii	Frontal bone	Skin underneath eyebrow
Flaring nostrils	Nasal cartilage (pushes nostrils open when cartilage is compressed)	Inferior compression; posterior compression	Nasalis	Maxilla	Nasal bone
Raising upper lip	Upper lip	Elevation	Levator labii superioris	Maxilla	Underneath skin at corners of the mouth; orbicularis oris
Lowering lower lip	Lower lip	Depression	Depressor labii inferioris	Mandible	Underneath skin of lower lip
Opening mouth and sliding lower jaw left and right	Lower jaw	Depression, lateral	Depressor angulus oris	Mandible	Underneath skin at corners of mouth
Smiling	Corners of mouth	Lateral elevation	Zygomaticus major	Zygomatic bone	Underneath skin at corners of mouth (dimple area), orbicularis oris
Shaping of lips (as during speech)	Lips	Multiple	Orbicularis oris	Tissue surrounding lips	Underneath skin at corners of the mouth
Lateral movement of cheeks (e.g., sucking on a straw; also used to compress air in mouth while blowing)	Cheeks	Lateral	Buccinator	Maxilla, mandible; sphenoid bone (via pterygomandibular raphae)	Orbicularis oris
Pursing of lips by straightening them laterally	Corners of mouth	Lateral	Risorius	Fascia of parotid salivary gland	Underneath the skin at corners of the mouth
Protrusion of lower lip (e.g., pouting expression)	Lower lip and skin of chin	Protraction	Mentalis	Mandible	Underneath skin of chin

== Development ==
The facial muscles are derived from the second branchial/pharyngeal arch. They, like the branchial arches, originally derive from neural crest cells. In humans, they typically begin forming around the eighth week of embryonic development.

== Clinical significance ==
An inability to form facial expressions on one side of the face may be the first sign of damage to the nerve of these muscles. Damage to the facial nerve results in facial paralysis of the muscles of facial expression on the involved side. Paralysis is the loss of voluntary muscle action; the facial nerve has become damaged permanently or temporarily. This damage can occur with a stroke, Bell palsy, or parotid salivary gland cancer (malignant neoplasm) because the facial nerve travels through the gland. The parotid gland can also be damaged permanently by surgery or temporarily by trauma. These situations of paralysis not only inhibit facial expression but also seriously impair the patient's ability to speak, either permanently or temporarily.

== See also ==
- Masticatory muscles
- Facial Action Coding System
- Modiolus
