= Modiolus (face) =

Chiasma of facial muscles

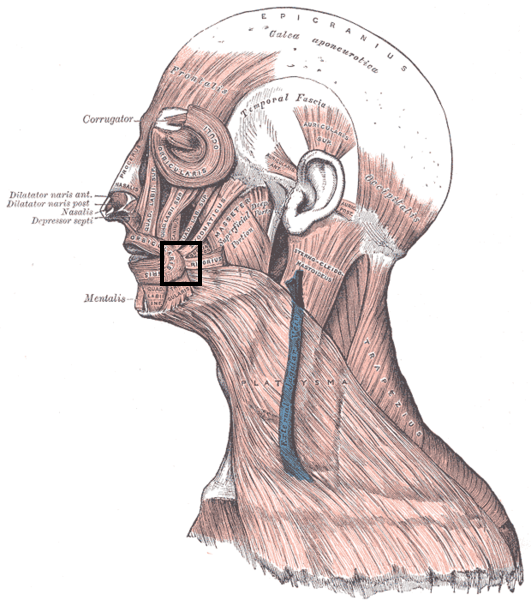

Identifiers
- TA98: A04.1.03.035
- TA2: 2085
- FMA: 46837

In facial anatomy, the modiolus is a dense, compact, mobile, fibromuscular tissue mass of facial muscles formed by the interlacing of a number of muscles just lateral to the angle of the mouth opposite the second upper premolar tooth.

There are no precise histological boundaries because the modiolus is an irregular zone where dense, compact, interlacing tissue grades into the stems of individually recognizable muscles. It is contributed to by at least nine muscles: orbicularis oris, buccinator, levator anguli oris, depressor anguli oris, zygomaticus major, zygomaticus minor, risorius, quadratus labii superioris, quadratus labii inferioris.

Its position and movements are important in moving the mouth, facial expression and in prosthetic dentistry. It is extremely important in relation to stability of lower denture, because of the strength and variability of movement of the area. It derives its motor nerve supply from the facial nerve, and its blood supply from labial branches of the facial artery.

== See also ==
- Modiolus (disambiguation)
