= Orbicularis muscle =

Orbicularis muscle may refer to

- Orbicularis oculi muscle, a muscle around the eye
- Orbicularis oris muscle, a muscle around the mouth
