= Cheek =

Facial feature

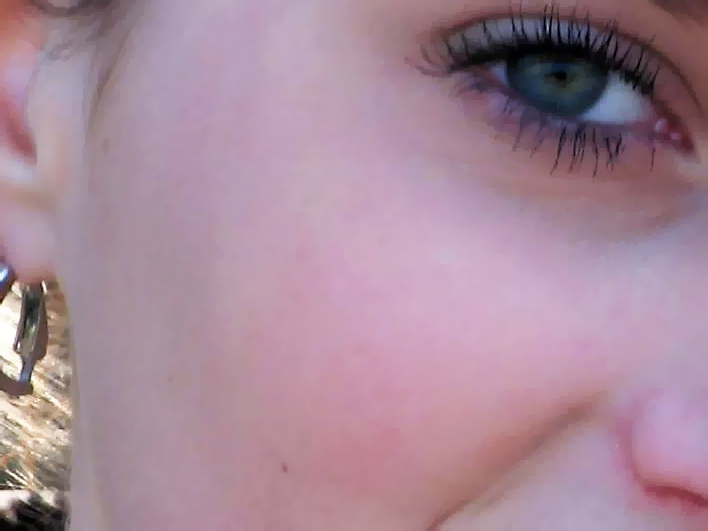
- Cheek of a female human

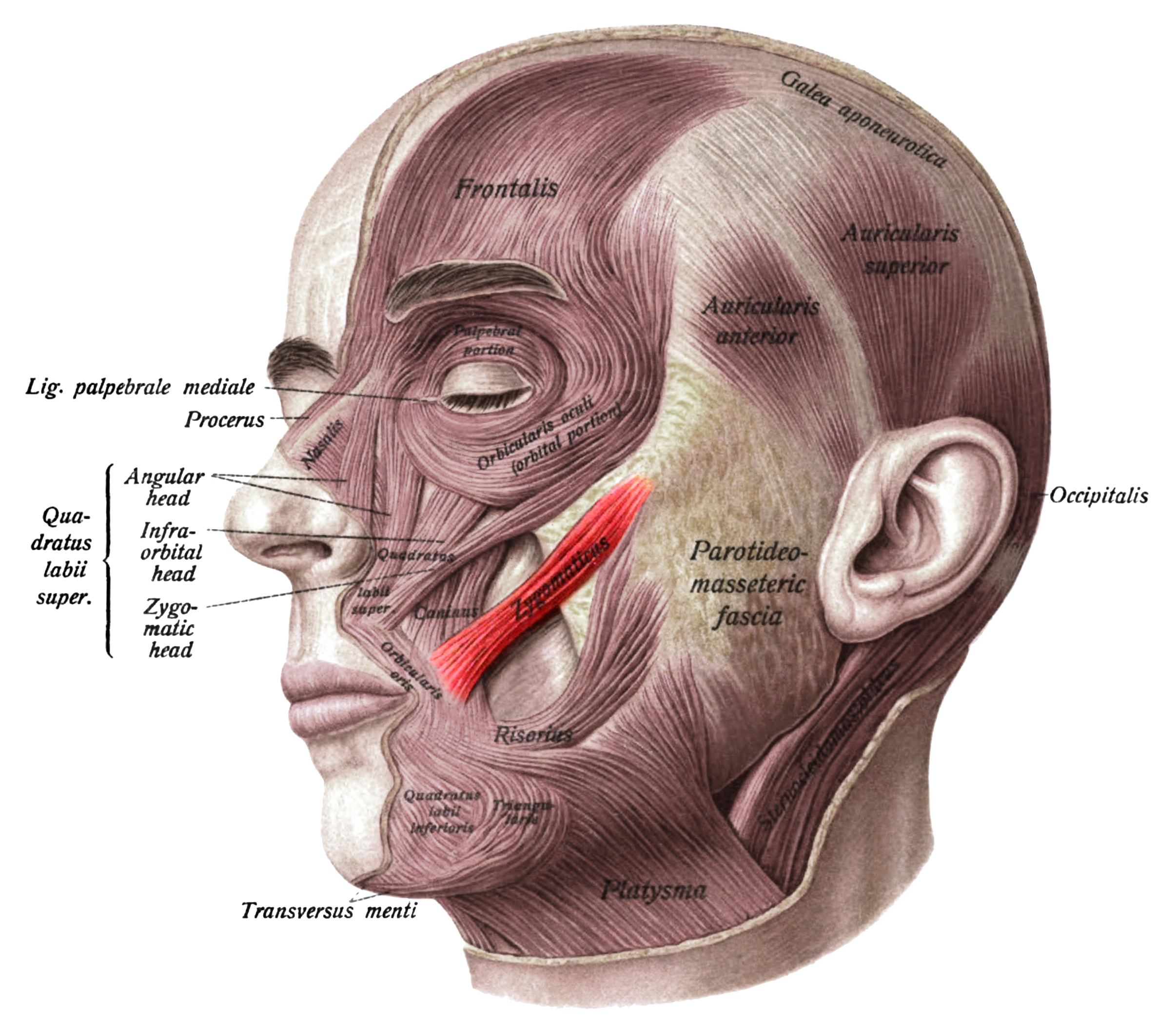
- A diagram detailing human facial muscles, including the zygomaticus major (red), which is contained within the cheeks and is integral to the action of smiling

Details
- Artery: Buccal artery
- Nerve: Buccal nerve, buccal branch of the facial nerve

Identifiers
- Latin: bucca
- MeSH: D002610
- TA98: A01.1.00.008; A05.1.01.014
- TA2: 116
- FMA: 46476

The cheeks (Latin: buccae) constitute the area of the face below the eyes and between the nose and the left or right ear. Buccal means relating to the cheek. In humans, the region is innervated by the buccal nerve. The area between the inside of the cheek and the teeth and gums is called the vestibule or buccal pouch or buccal cavity and forms part of the mouth. In other animals, the cheeks may also be referred to as "jowls".

== Structure ==
Cheeks are fleshy in humans, the skin being suspended by the chin and the jaws, and forming the lateral wall of the human mouth, visibly touching the cheekbone below the eye. The inside of the cheek is lined with a mucous membrane (buccal mucosa, part of the oral mucosa).

During mastication (chewing), the cheeks and tongue between them serve to keep the food between the teeth.

== Clinical significance ==
The cheek is the most common location from which a DNA sample can be taken. (Some saliva is collected from inside the mouth, e.g. using a cotton-tipped rod called a swab or "Q-Tip". The procedure of collecting a sample in that way is typically called a "cheek swab".)

== Other animals ==
The cheeks are covered externally by hairy skin, and internally by stratified squamous epithelium. This is mostly smooth, but may have caudally directed papillae (e.g., in ruminants). The mucosa is supplied with secretions from the buccal glands, which are arranged in superior and inferior groups. In carnivores, the superior buccal gland is large and discrete: the zygomatic gland. During mastication, the cheeks and tongue between them serve to keep the food between the teeth.

Some animals such as squirrels and hamsters use the buccal pouch to carry food or other items.

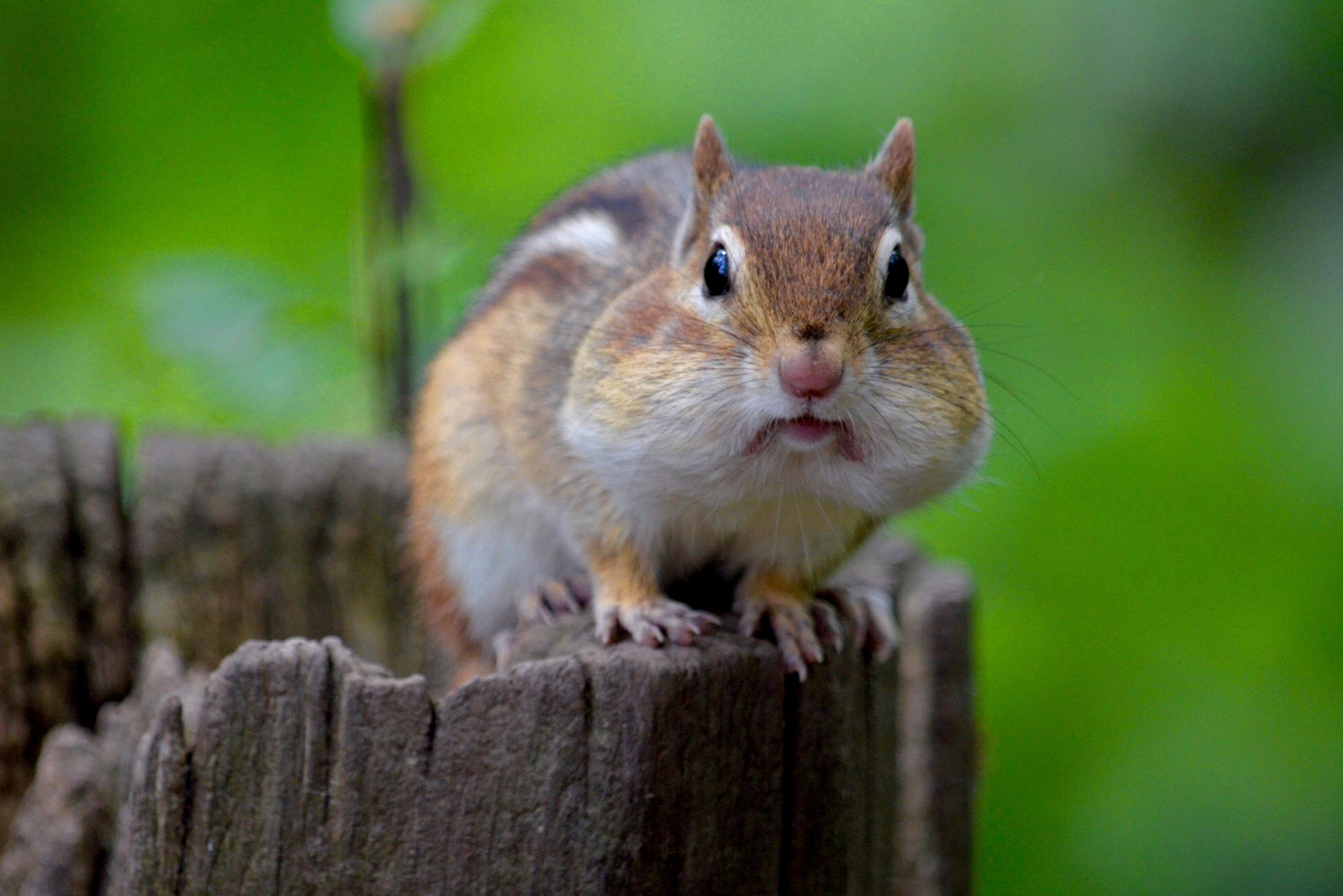
An eastern chipmunk using its buccal pouch to store food

In some vertebrates, markings on the cheek area, particularly immediately beneath the eye, often serve as important distinguishing features between species or individuals.

== See also ==
- Blushing
- Cheek augmentation
- Cheek kissing
- Erythema infectiosum
- High cheekbones
- Slapped cheek
- Zygomatic bone
