= Facial electromyography =

Electromyography technique that measures muscle activity of the face

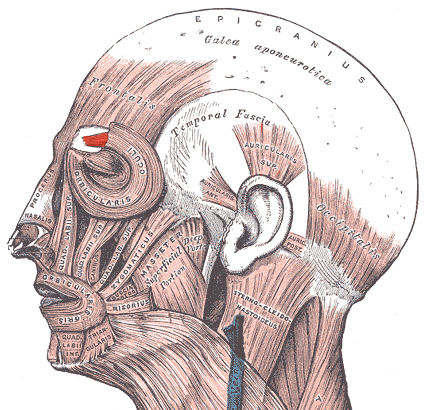
- Corrugator supercilii muscle (associated with frowning)
- Purpose: measures muscle activity by detecting electrical impulses(face)

Facial electromyography (fEMG) refers to an electromyography (EMG) technique that measures muscle activity by detecting and amplifying the tiny electrical impulses that are generated by muscle fibers when they contract.

It primarily focuses on two major muscle groups in the face, the corrugator supercilii group which is associated with frowning and the zygomaticus major muscle group which is associated with smiling.

== Uses ==
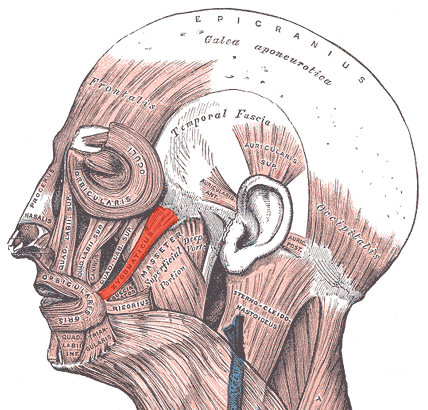
Zygomaticus major muscle (associated with smiling)

Facial EMG has been studied to assess its utility as a tool for measuring emotional reaction. Studies have found that activity of the corrugator muscle, which lowers the eyebrow and is involved in producing frowns, varies inversely with the emotional valence of presented stimuli and reports of mood state. Activity of the zygomatic major muscle, which controls smiling, is said to be positively associated with positive emotional stimuli and positive mood state.

Facial EMG has been used as a technique to distinguish and track positive and negative emotional reactions to a stimulus as they occur. A large number of those experiments have been conducted in controlled laboratory environments using a range of stimuli, e.g., still pictures, movie clips and music pieces.

It has also been used to investigate emotional responses in individuals with autism spectrum disorders.

Although commonly used as an index of emotional responses, facial muscle activity is also influenced by the social context in which it is measured. Using facial EMG in immersive virtual environments, Philipp, Storrs, and Vanman showed that even relatively impoverished social cues in a virtual environment can cause increases in zygomaticus major activity that are unrelated to self-reported emotional states.

In a study in 2012, Durso et al. demonstrated that facial EMG could detect confusion in subjects who acknowledged they were confused and in those who did not. The authors considered facial EMG could effectively monitor loss of understanding or of situation awareness.

=== Market research and gaming ===
Two areas where facial EMG techniques have been used are in advertising research and in video gaming.

1. Advertising research - Of late, facial EMG has been used to test audience response to commercial advertising. Facial EMG activity measures during a viewing of commercials embedded in TV program clips have been used to describe a commercial's level of emotional activation and engagement. Measurement of the corrugator and zygomatic muscles, yield an overall positive and negative emotional activation score. The moment to moment activation that are recorded are said to measure the dynamic emotional response to a commercial and yield useful insights about the elements of the commercials. Lou et al. showed that facial EMG activity can be used to forecast how game players would be addicted to an online game before the game is officially introduced to the market.
2. Gaming and Human-Computer Interaction (HCI) - Ravaja, Hazlett and Mandryk used facial EMG techniques to demonstrate that positive and negative emotions can be measured in real time during video game play. The emotional profiling of games give a useful evaluation of a game's impact on a player, how compelling they find the game, how the game measures up to other games in its genre, and how the different elements of the game enhance or detract from the game's approach to engaging the player.

== Advantages ==
Proponents of Facial EMG point to the following advantages:

1. Facial Electromyography (or fEMG) is a precise and sensitive method to measure emotional expression.
2. Unlike self-reports, fEMG does not depend upon language and does not require cognitive effort or memory.
3. fEMG is capable of registering the response even when subjects were instructed to inhibit their emotional expression.
4. Yields a lot of data and is continuous and scalar (hence more credible.)
5. It is able to measure facial muscle activities to even weakly evocative emotional stimuli.
6. Less intrusive than other physiological measures like fMRI and EEG.
7. Like other physiological measures, facial EMG measurement technique is often the only useful approach when movement is not visible.

== Criticisms ==
1. The technique is intrusive and may alter natural expression.
2. The number of muscles it can employ is limited by how many electrodes can be attached to the face.
3. Certain medicines that act on the nervous system, such as muscle relaxants and anticholinergics, can change electromyography (EMG) results.

== See also ==
- Facial Action Coding System
- Computer processing of body language
