= Infraorbital margin =

Lower margin of the eye socket

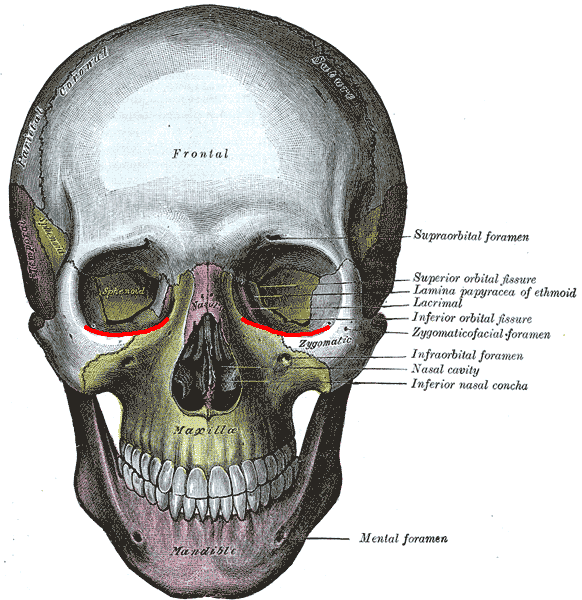
- Skull, anterior view, with infraorbital margin labeled in red.

Details

Identifiers
- Latin: margo infraorbitalis
- TA98: A02.1.00.072
- TA2: 476
- FMA: 53177

The infraorbital margin is the lower margin of the eye socket.

== Structure ==
It consists of the zygomatic bone and the maxilla, on which it separates the anterior and the orbital surface of the body of the maxilla.

== Function ==
It is an attachment for the levator labii superioris muscle.
