= Buccal nerve =

Nerve in the human face

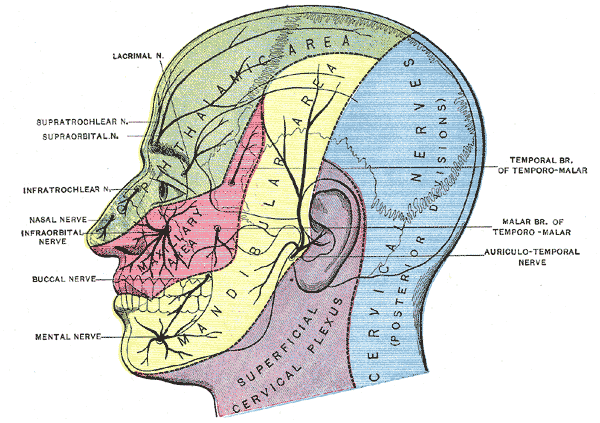
- Sensory areas of the head, showing the general distribution of the three divisions of the trigeminal nerve (buccal nerve labeled at center left)

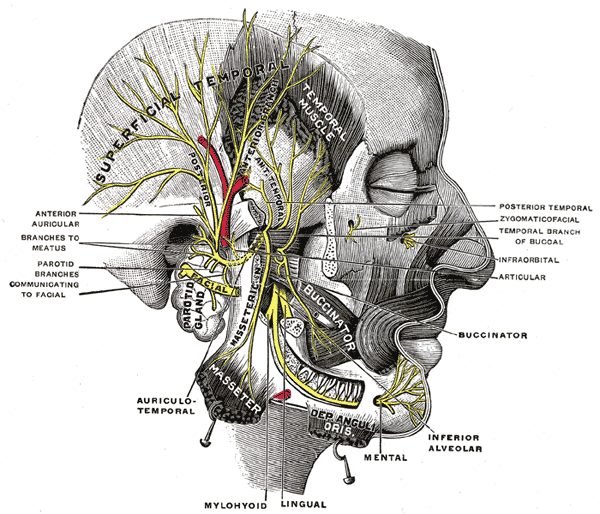
- Mandibular division of the trigeminal nerve

Details
- From: Mandibular nerve
- Innervates: Lateral pterygoid muscle and cheek

Identifiers
- Latin: nervus buccalis
- TA98: A14.2.01.073
- TA2: 6258
- FMA: 53066

The buccal nerve (long buccal nerve) is a sensory nerve of the face arising from the mandibular nerve (CN V3) (which is itself a branch of the trigeminal nerve). It conveys sensory information from the skin of the cheek, and parts of the oral mucosa, and periodontium.

== Structure ==
=== Origin ===
The buccal nerve is a branch of the anterior division of the mandibular nerve (CN V3). It is the only sensory branch of the anterior division.

=== Course and relations ===
After branching from the anterior trunk of the mandibular nerve (CN V3), the buccal nerve passes between the two heads of the lateral pterygoid muscle, underneath the tendon of the temporalis muscle. It then passes anterior to the ramus of the mandible to first course deep to the masseter muscle, and finally anteroinferiorly upon surface of the buccinator muscle before piercing this muscle.

=== Communications ===
It connects with the buccal branches of the facial nerve on the surface of the buccinator muscle. It gives off many significant branches.

=== Distribution ===
The buccal nerve provides sensory innervation to the skin of the cheek, the buccal mucosa, buccal periodontium, and gingiva of mandibular/lower molar and second premolar teeth (until the mental foramen). It also issues proprioceptive fibres into the buccinator muscle.

== Clinical significance ==
=== Anesthesia ===
Buccal nerve block (long buccal nerve block) is indicated for procedures involving the mucosa adjacent to the posterior molar teeth, such as the placement of a rubber dam clamp. The injection site is distal and buccal to the third molar, with the needle penetrating 1-2mm as the nerve lies directly below the mucosa. A buccal nerve block is carried out after an inferior alveolar nerve block for specific procedures, such as extraction of mandibular molar teeth.

=== Surgical damage ===
The buccal nerve may be damaged by surgical incisions near the external oblique ridge of the mandible.

== Additional images ==
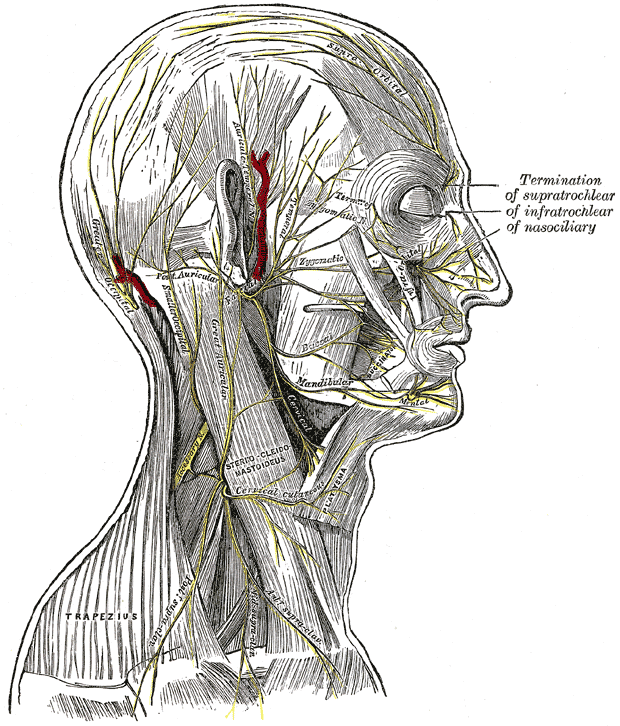
The nerves of the scalp, face, and side of neck.

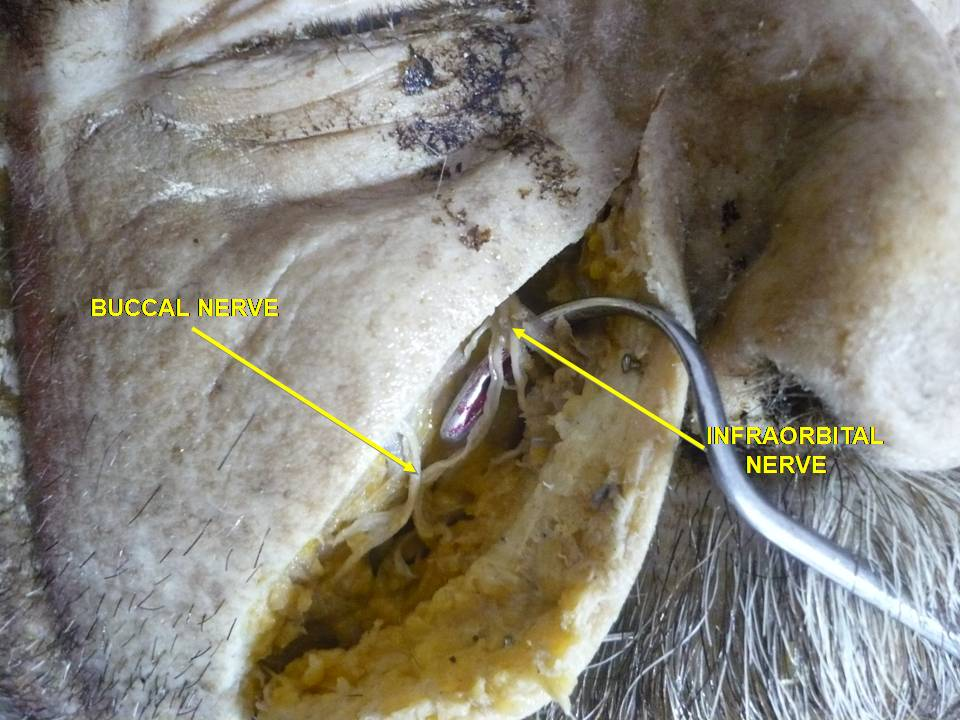
Infaorbital and buccal nerve. Superficial dissection. Lateral view.
