= Levator anguli oris =

Muscle of the mouth

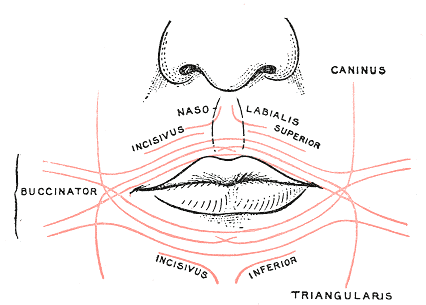
- Scheme showing arrangement of fibers of orbicularis oris.

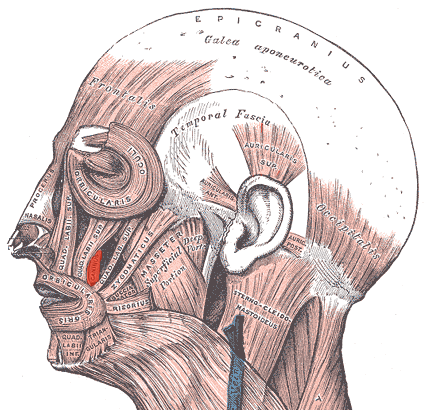

Details
- Origin: Maxilla
- Insertion: Modiolus
- Artery: Facial artery
- Nerve: Buccal branches of the facial nerve
- Actions: Smile (elevates angle of mouth)

Identifiers
- Latin: musculus levator anguli oris or musculus caninus
- TA98: A04.1.03.034
- TA2: 2084
- FMA: 46822

The levator anguli oris (caninus) is a facial muscle of the mouth arising from the canine fossa, immediately below the infraorbital foramen. It elevates angle of mouth medially. Its fibers are inserted into the angle of the mouth, intermingling with those of the zygomaticus, triangularis, and orbicularis oris. Specifically, the levator anguli oris is innervated by the buccal branches of the facial nerve.

== Additional images ==
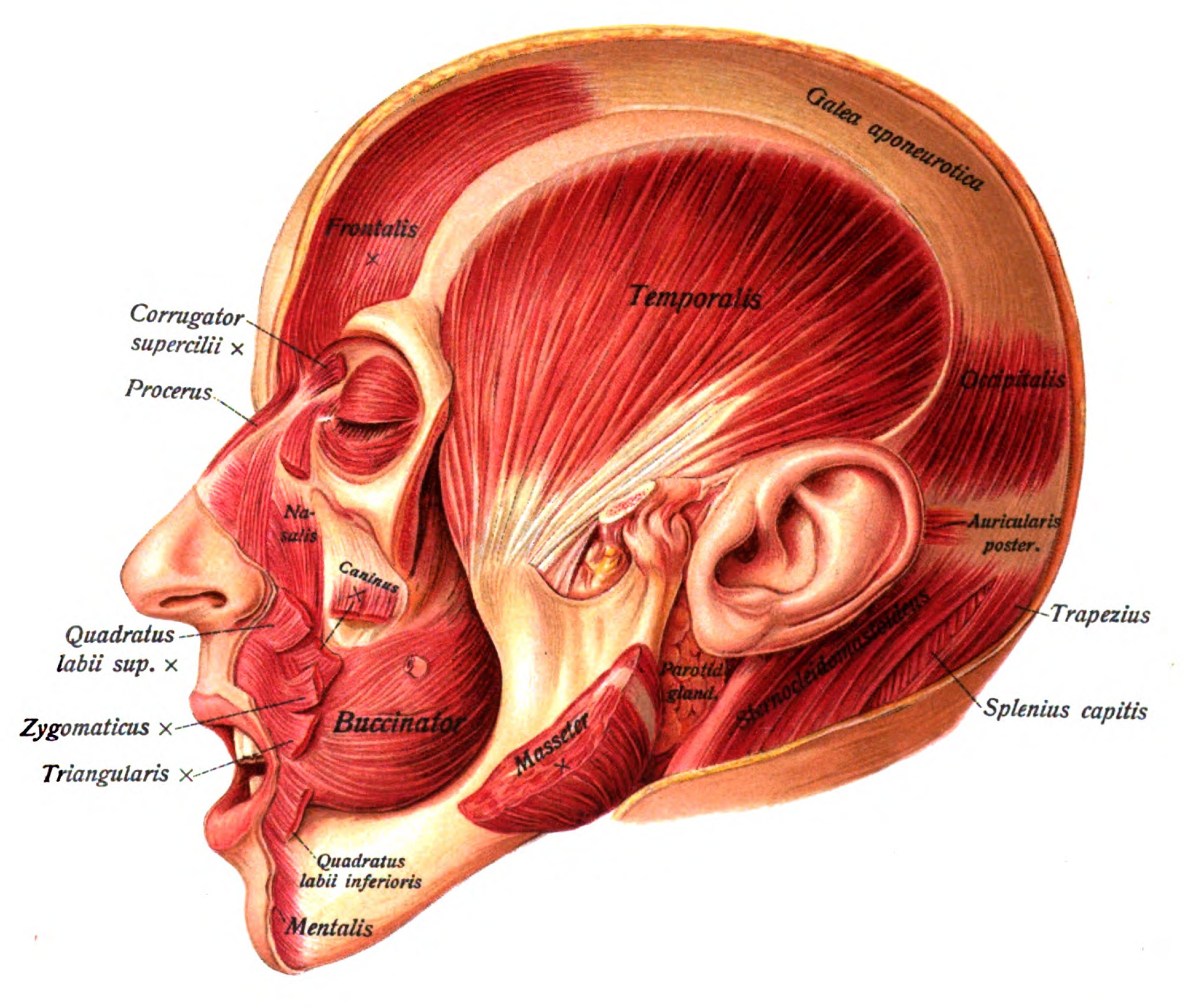

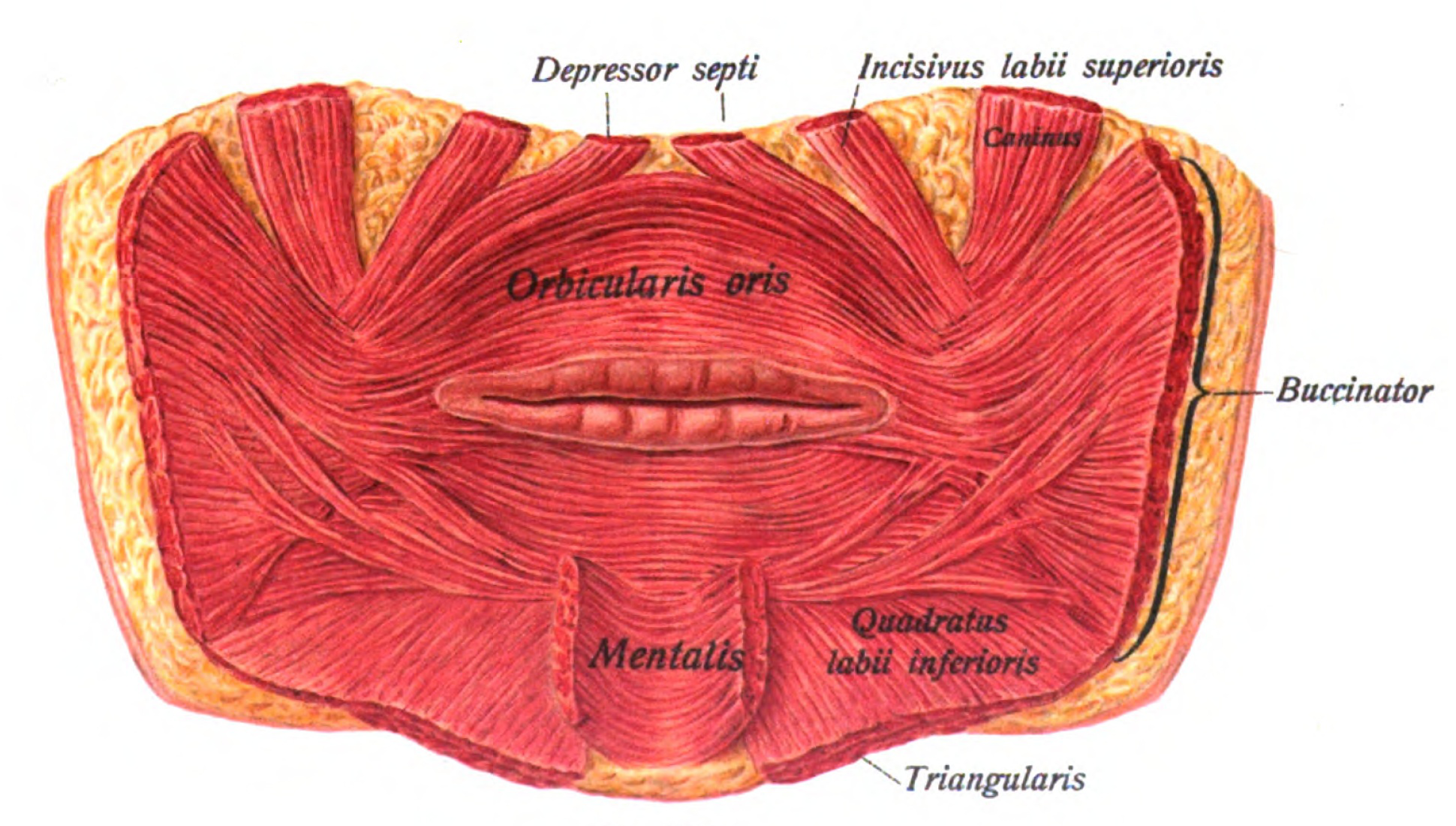
Seen from the inside.
