= Buccal branches of the facial nerve =

Nerves of the mouth

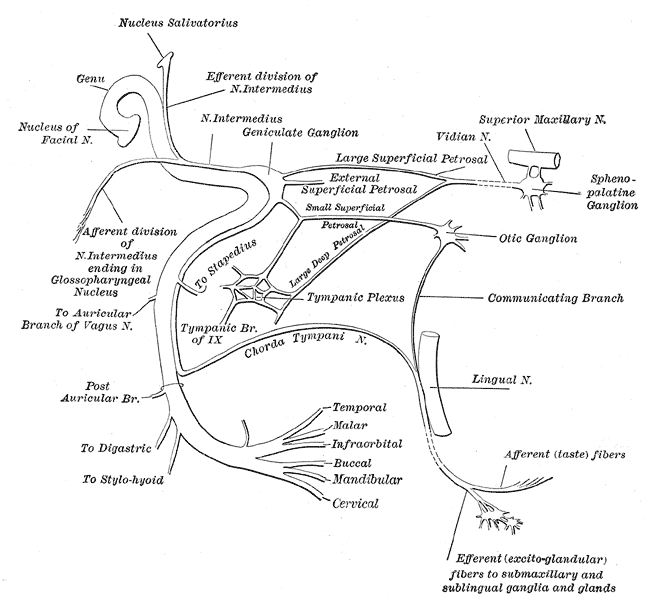
- Plan of the facial and intermediate nerves and their communication with other nerves. (Labeled at center bottom, third from the bottom.)

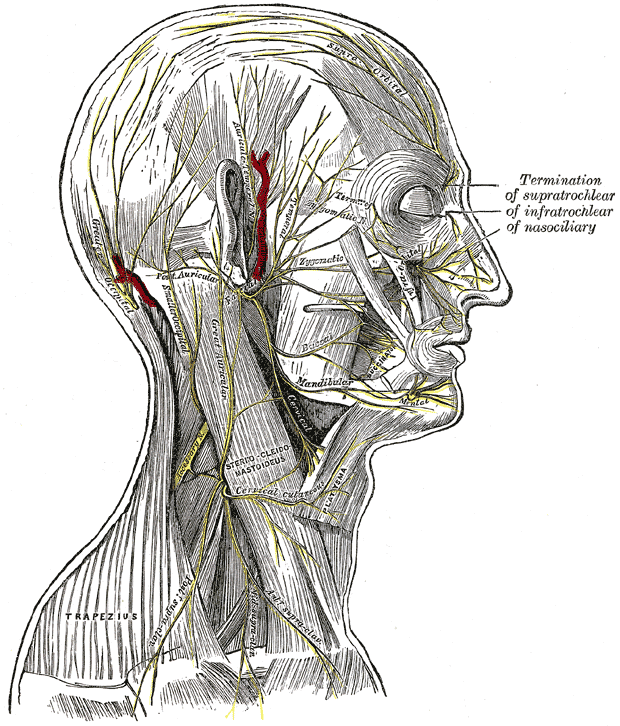
- The nerves of the scalp, face, and side of neck.

Details
- From: Facial nerve
- Innervates: Cheek

Identifiers
- Latin: rami buccales nervi facialis
- TA98: A14.2.01.111
- TA2: 6304
- FMA: 53310

The buccal branches of the facial nerve (infraorbital branches), are of larger size than the rest of the branches, pass horizontally forward to be distributed below the orbit and around the mouth.

== Branches ==
The superficial branches run beneath the skin and above the superficial muscles of the face, which they supply: some are distributed to the procerus, joining at the medial angle of the orbit with the infratrochlear and nasociliary branches of the ophthalmic.

The deep branches pass beneath the zygomaticus and the quadratus labii superioris, supplying them and forming an infraorbital plexus with the infraorbital branch of the maxillary nerve. These branches also supply the small muscles of the nose.

The lower deep branches supply the buccinator and orbicularis oris, and join with filaments of the buccinator branch of the mandibular nerve.

== Muscles of facial expression ==
The facial nerve innervates the muscles of facial expression. The buccal branch supplies these muscles

Muscle	Action
Risorius	Smirk
Buccinator	Aids chewing by holding cheeks flat
Levator labii superioris	Elevates upper lip
Levator labii superioris alaeque nasi muscle	Snarl
Levator anguli oris	Soft smile
Nasalis	Flare nostrils
Orbicularis oris muscle	Purse Lips
Depressor septi nasi	Depresses nasal septum
Procerus	Moves skin of forehead

== Testing the nerve ==
• Puff up cheeks (buccinator)

i. Tap with finger over each cheek to detect ease of air expulsion on the affected side

• Smile and show teeth (orbicularis oris)

== See also ==
- Buccal nerve

== Additional images ==
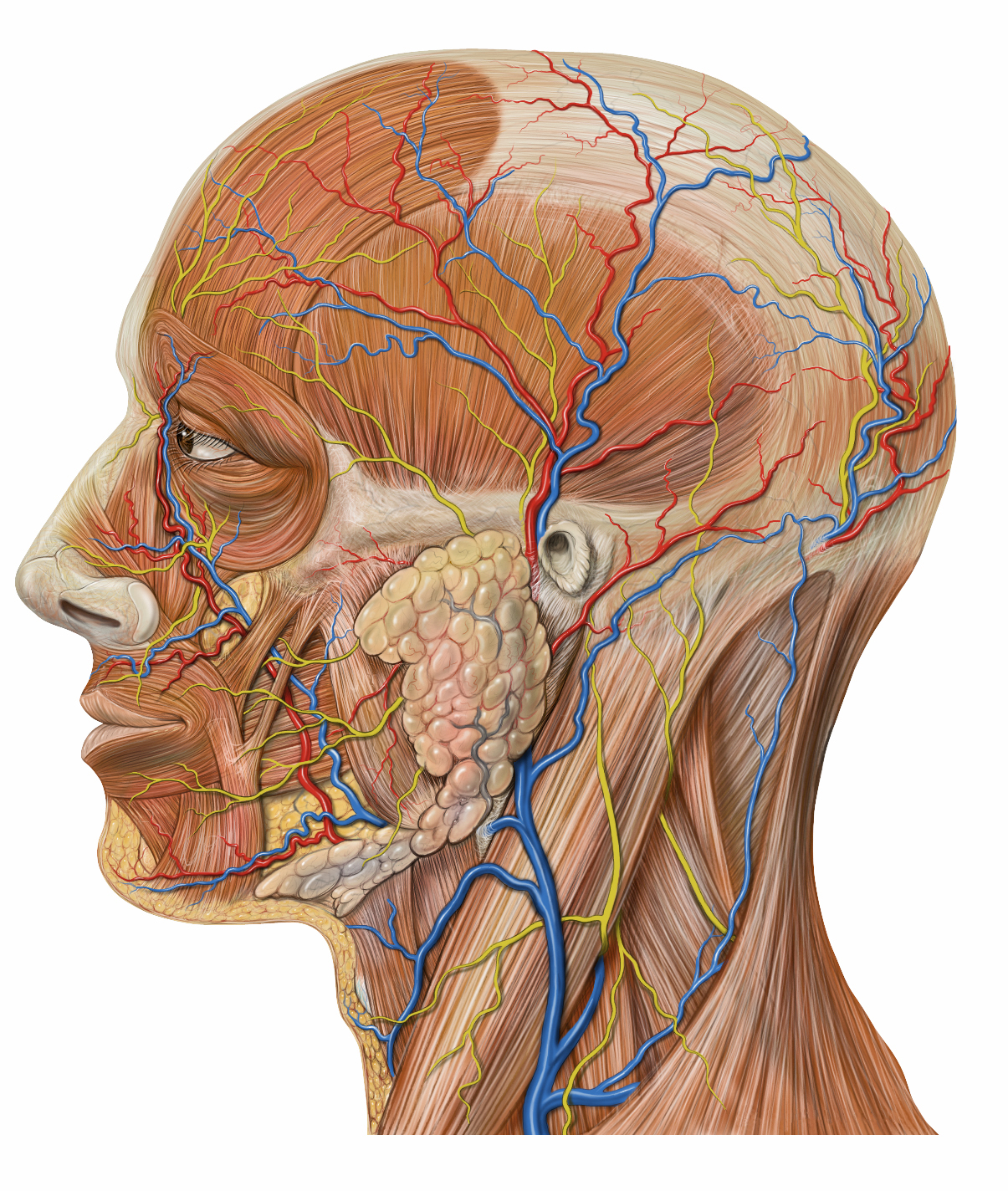
Lateral head anatomy detail

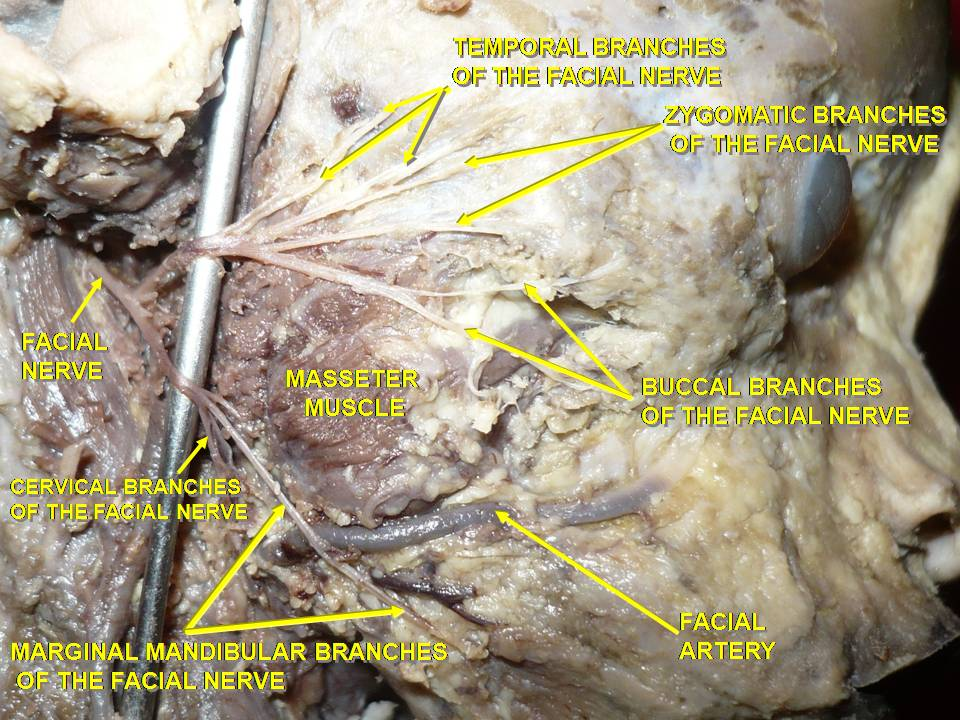
Lateral head anatomy detail.Dissection the newborn
