= Pars palpebralis =

Pars palpebralis in a medical context means "relating to the eyelids." It is the source of the English word "palpebral".

It might refer to the palpebral part of the lacrimal gland or the palpebral part of the orbicularis oculi.
