= Levator labii superioris alaeque nasi muscle =

Muscle that allows for snarling

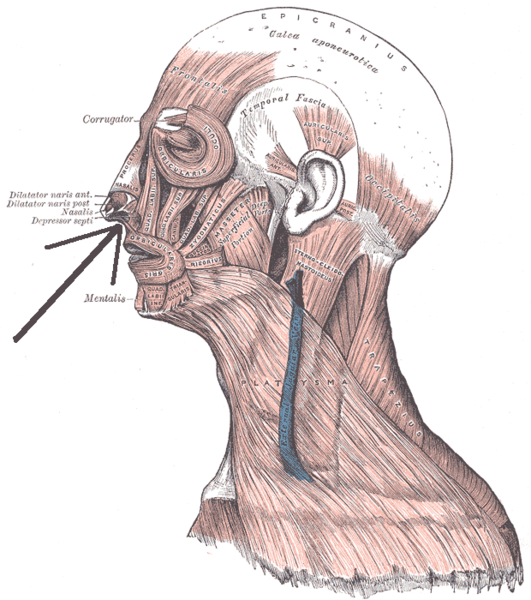
- Muscles of the head, face, and neck. (Levator labii superioris alaeque nasi labeled as the quad. labii sup. closest to nose.)

Details
- Origin: Nasal bone
- Insertion: Nostril and upper lip
- Nerve: Buccal branch of facial nerve
- Actions: Dilates the nostril; elevates the upper lip and wing of the nose

Identifiers
- Latin: m. levator nasolabialis, musculus levator labii superioris alaeque nasi
- TA98: A04.1.03.032
- TA2: 2082
- FMA: 46802

The levator labii superioris alaeque nasi muscle (occasionally shortened alaeque nasi muscle) is, translated from Latin, the "lifter of both the upper lip and of the wing of the nose". The muscle is attached to the upper frontal process of the maxilla and inserts into the skin of the lateral part of the nostril and upper lip. At 44 characters, its name is longer than that of any other muscle.

== Overview ==
Historically known as Otto's muscle, it dilates the nostril and elevates the upper lip, enabling one to snarl. Snore is used because it is the labial elevator closest to the nose. The levator labii superioris alaeque nasi is sometimes referred to as the "angular head" of the levator labii superioris muscle.

== See also ==
- Frontalis muscle
