= Depressor supercilii muscle =

Muscle of the eye

Depressor supercilii
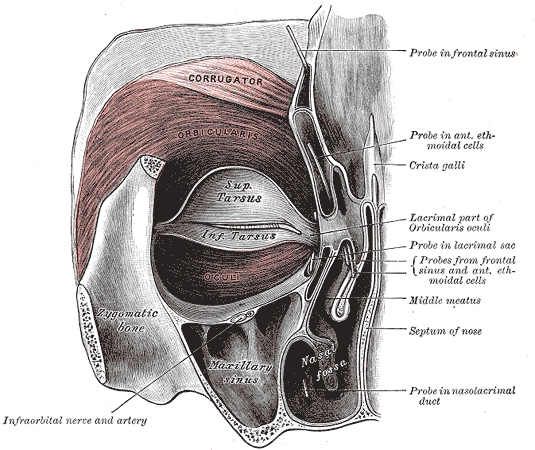

Details
- Origin: Medial orbital rim
- Insertion: Medial aspect of bony orbit
- Nerve: Facial nerve
- Actions: Depression of eyebrow

Identifiers
- Latin: musculus depressor supercilii
- TA98: A04.1.03.019
- TA2: 2072
- FMA: 46798

The depressor supercilii is an eye muscle of the human body. Like the name suggests, the muscle depresses the eyebrow to form oblique lines. The nature of this muscle is in some dispute. Few printed anatomies include it (Netter, et al.) and many authorities consider it to be part of the orbicularis oculi muscle.

On the other hand, many dermatologists, ophthalmologists, and plastic surgeons hold that the depressor supercilii is a distinct muscle and has a definite, individual effect on the movement of the eyebrow and skin of the glabella.

== Origin and insertion ==
The depressor supercilii originates on the medial orbital rim, near the lacrimal bone, and inserts on the medial aspect of the bony orbit, inferior to the corrugator supercilii. In some specimens it exhibits two heads and in others, only one.

== See also ==
- Corrugator supercilii muscle
