= Zygomaticus minor muscle =

Facial muscle that draws the upper lip upwards and backwards during smiling

Zygomaticus minor
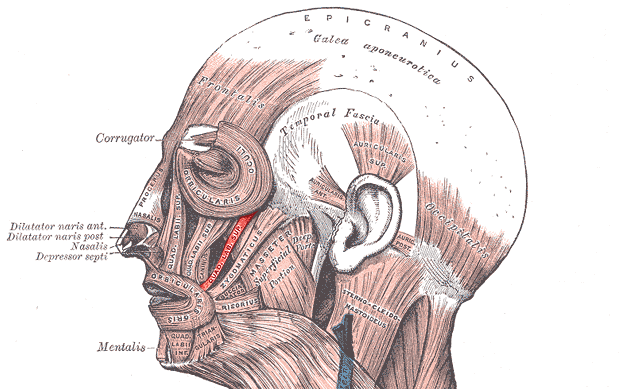
- Muscles of the head, face, and neck.

Details
- Origin: Zygomatic bone
- Insertion: Skin of the upper lip
- Artery: Facial artery
- Nerve: Buccal branch
- Actions: Elevates upper lip

Identifiers
- Latin: musculus zygomaticus minor
- TA98: A04.1.03.030
- TA2: 2080
- FMA: 46811

The zygomaticus minor muscle is a muscle of facial expression. It originates from the zygomatic bone, lateral to the rest of the levator labii superioris muscle, and inserts into the outer part of the upper lip. It draws the upper lip backward, upward, and outward and is used in smiling. It is innervated by the facial nerve (VII).

== Structure ==
The zygomaticus minor muscle passes inferomedially from its origin to its insertion at an angle of approximately 30°. It has a mean width of around 0.5 cm.

=== Origin ===
It originates from the lateral aspect of just posterior to the zygomaticomaxillary suture.

=== Insertion ===
It inserts into the muscular tissue of the upper lip, blending distally with levator labii superioris muscle.

=== Innervation ===
The zygomaticus minor muscle receives motor innervation from the zygomatic branches and buccal branches of the facial nerve (CN VII).

=== Relations ===
The zygomaticus minor lies lateral to the rest of levator labii superioris muscle, and medial to its stronger synergist zygomaticus major muscle.

=== Variation ===
The zygomaticus minor muscle may have either a straight or a curved course along its length. It may attach to both the upper lip and the lateral alar region. It may be underdeveloped in some people, with its role taken over by nearby synergists. These synergists rarely change shape or position, but any difference in smile is usually imperceptible.

== Function ==
The zygomaticus minor muscle draws the upper lip up, back, and out, such as during smiling.

== History ==
The zygomaticus minor muscle is sometimes referred to as the "zygomatic head" of the levator labii superioris muscle.

== Additional images ==
Zygomaticus minor muscle (shown in red).

== See also ==
- Zygomaticus major muscle
- Zygomatic bone
