= Zygomaticus major muscle =

Facial muscle

Zygomaticus major
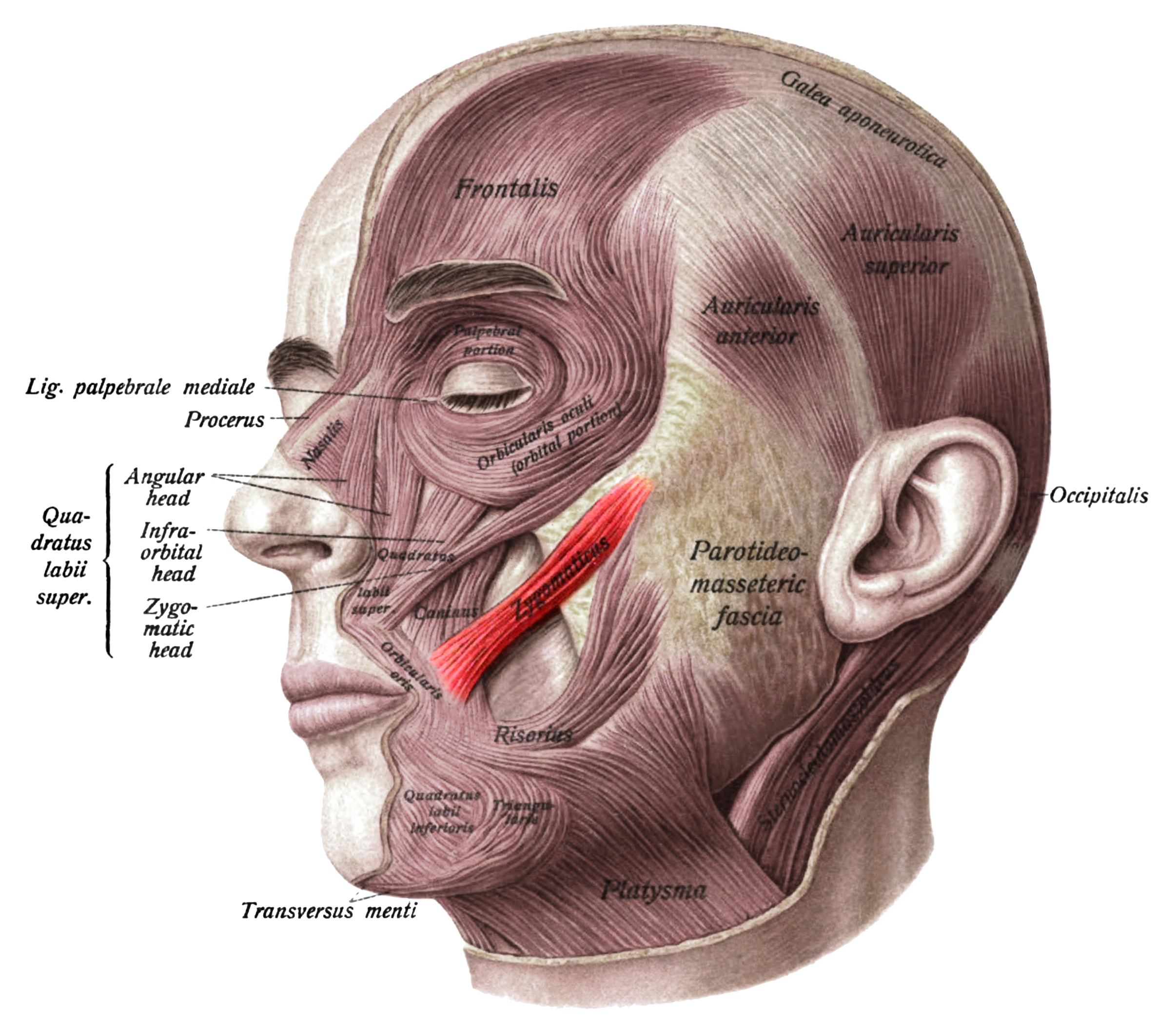
- Muscles of the head, face, and neck. Zygomaticus major shown in red.

Details
- Origin: Anterior of zygomatic
- Insertion: Modiolus of the mouth
- Artery: Facial artery
- Nerve: Zygomatic and buccal branches of the facial nerve
- Actions: Draws the angle of the mouth upward laterally

Identifiers
- Latin: musculus zygomaticus major
- TA98: A04.1.03.029
- TA2: 2079
- FMA: 46810

The zygomaticus major muscle is a muscle of the face. It arises from either zygomatic arch (cheekbone); it inserts at the corner of the mouth. It is innervated by branches of the facial nerve (cranial nerve VII).

It is a muscle of facial expression, which draws the angle of the mouth superiorly and posteriorly to allow one to smile. Bifid zygomaticus major muscle is a notable variant, and may cause cheek dimples.

== Structure ==
=== Origin ===
The zygomaticus major muscle originates from the superior margin of the lateral surface of the temporal process of zygomatic bone, just anterior to the zygomaticotemporal suture.

=== Insertion ===
It inserts at the corner of the mouth by blending with the levator anguli oris muscle, the orbicularis oris muscle, and the deeper muscular structures.

=== Nerve supply ===
The muscle receives motor innervation from the buccal branch and zygomatic branch of the facial nerve (CN VII).

=== Vasculature ===
The muscle receives arterial supply from the superior labial artery.

=== Variation ===
The zygomaticus major muscle may occur in a bifid form, with two fascicles that are partially or completely separate from each other but adjacent. It is thought that cheek dimples are caused by bifid zygomaticus major muscle.

== Function ==
The zygomaticus major muscle raises the upper lip to bare the upper teeth. It additionally deepens and raises the nasolabial furrow. Acting in conjunction with other muscles of facial expression that elevate the lip, it curls the upper lip to produce facial expressions such as smiling, disdain, contempt, or smugness.

== Physiology ==
The average muscle can contract with a force of 200 g.

== Clinical significance ==
The zygomaticus major muscle may be used in reconstructive surgery to replace lost tissue, such as with injuries to the lips.

== Additional images ==
Position of zygomaticus major muscle. Animation.

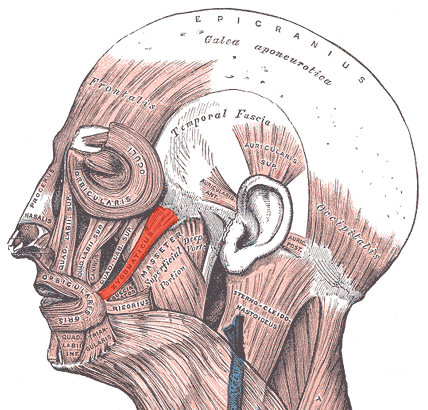
Muscles of the head, face, and neck. Zygomaticus major shown in red.

== See also ==
- Zygomaticus minor muscle
