= Levator labii superioris =

Muscle of the face

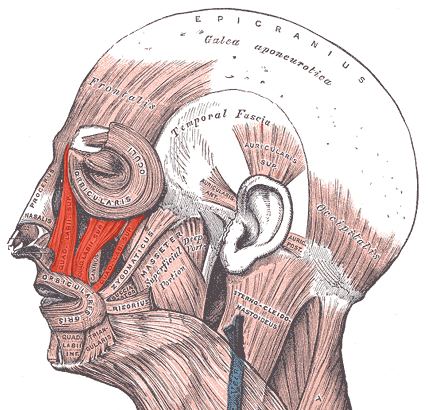
- Muscles of the head, face, and neck.

Details
- Origin: Medial infra-orbital margin
- Insertion: Skin and muscle of the upper lip (labii superioris)
- Artery: Facial artery
- Nerve: Buccal branch of the facial nerve (C.N. VII)
- Actions: Elevates the upper lip

Identifiers
- Latin: musculus levator labii superioris
- TA98: A04.1.03.031
- TA2: 2081
- FMA: 46805

The levator labii superioris (pl.: levatores labii superioris, also called quadratus labii superioris, pl.: quadrati labii superioris) is a muscle of the human body used in facial expression. It is a broad sheet, the origin of which extends from the side of the nose to the zygomatic bone.

== Structure ==
Its medial fibers form the angular head (also known as the levator labii superioris alaeque nasi muscle) which arises by a pointed extremity from the upper part of the frontal process of the maxilla and passing obliquely downward and lateralward divides into two slips.

One of these is inserted into the greater alar cartilage and skin of the nose; the other is prolonged into the lateral part of the upper lip, blending with the infraorbital head and with the orbicularis oris.

The intermediate portion or infraorbital head arises from the lower margin of the orbit immediately above the infraorbital foramen, some of its fibers being attached to the maxilla, others to the zygomatic bone.

Its fibers converge, to be inserted into the muscular substance of the upper lip between the angular head and the levator anguli oris.

The lateral fibers, forming the zygomatic head (also known as the zygomaticus minor muscle) arise from the malar surface of the zygomatic bone immediately behind the zygomaticomaxillary suture and pass downward and medialward to the upper lip.

== Function ==
Its main function is to elevate the upper lip.

== See also ==
- Levator labii superioris alaeque nasi

== Additional images ==
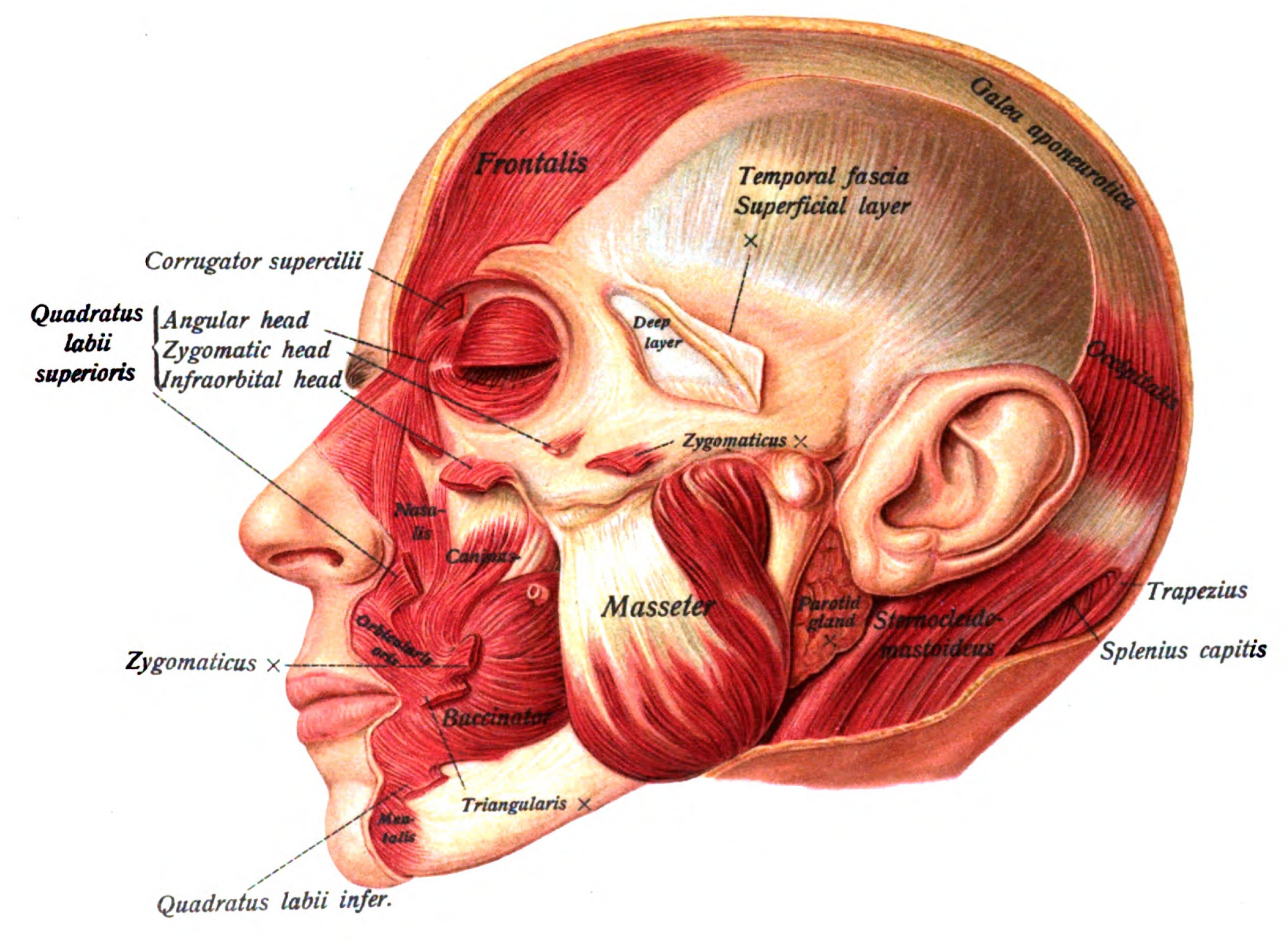

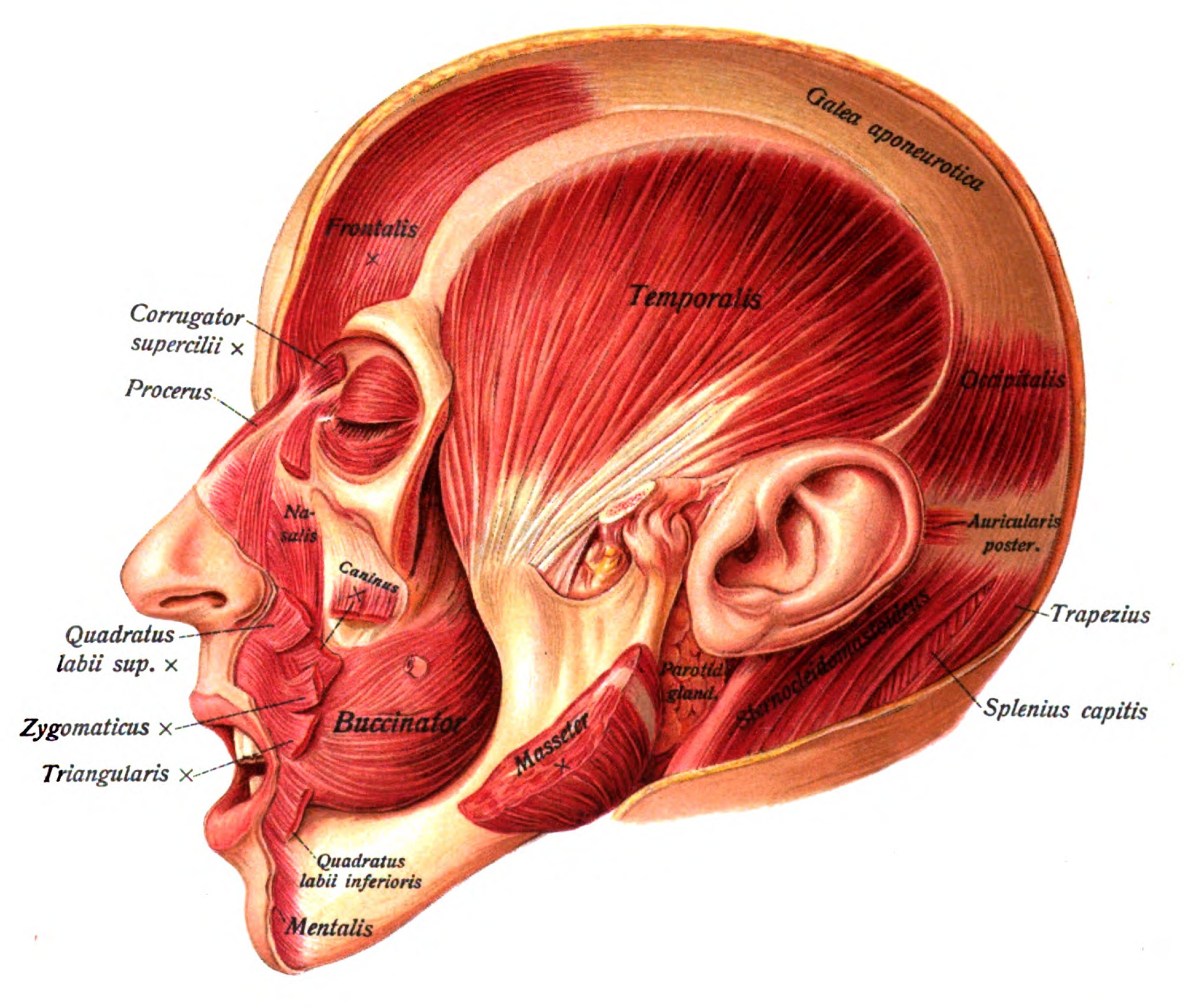

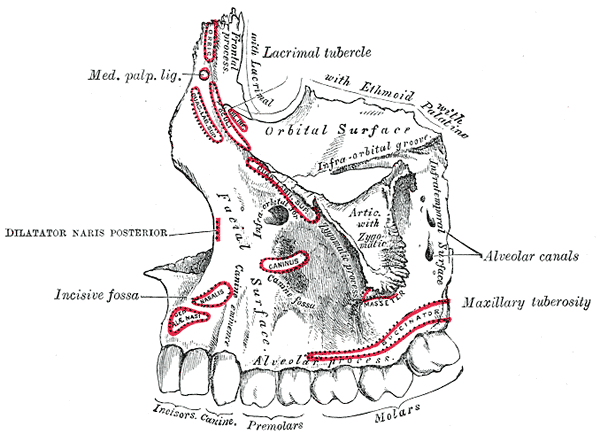
Left maxilla. Outer surface.

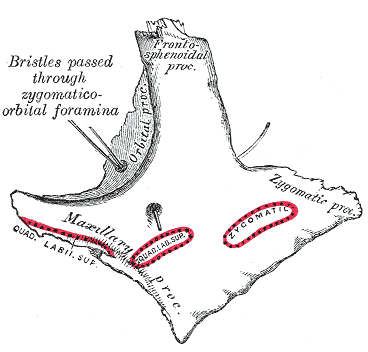
Left zygomatic bone. Malar surface.

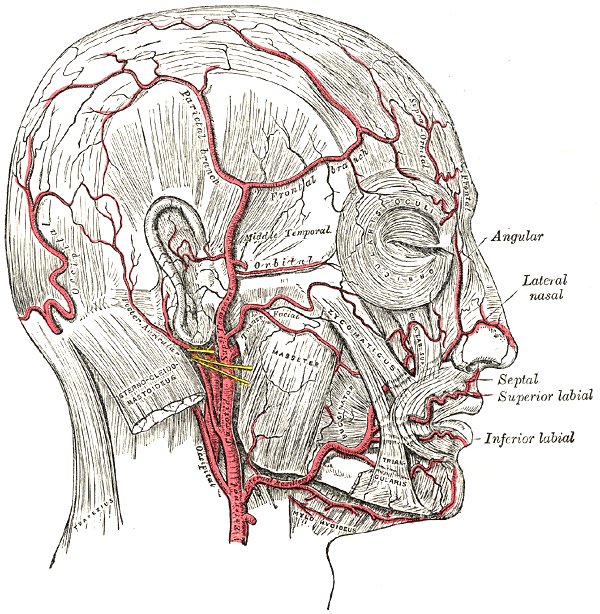
The arteries of the face and scalp.
