= Smile =

Conscious or unconscious facial muscular movement conveying happiness or pleasure

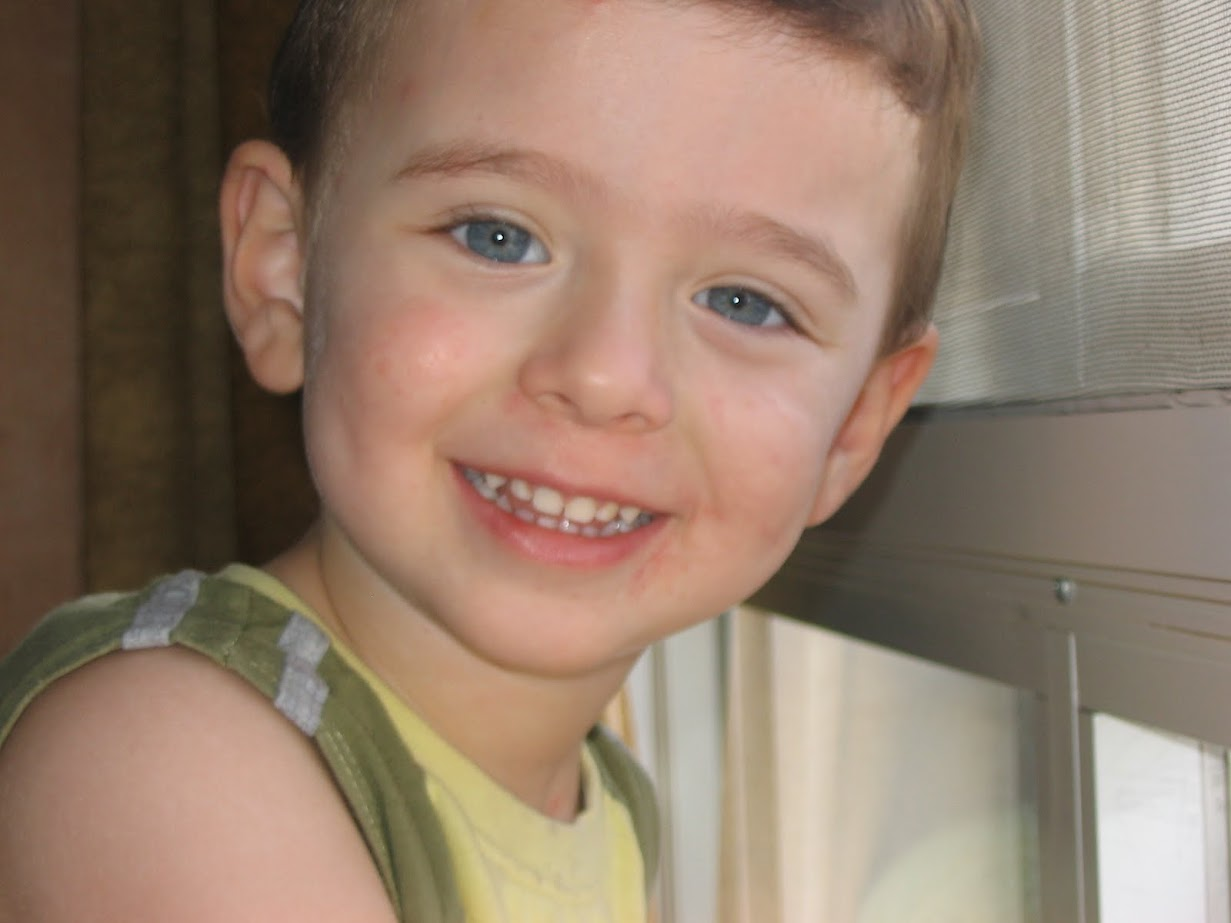
A smiling child

The Mona Lisa by Leonardo da Vinci, who is known for her smile

A smile is a facial expression formed primarily by flexing the muscles at the sides of the mouth. Some smiles include a contraction of the muscles at the corner of the eyes, an action known as a Duchenne smile. Among humans, a smile expresses delight, sociability, happiness, joy, or amusement. It is distinct from a similar but usually involuntary expression of anxiety known as a grimace. Although cross-cultural studies have shown that smiling is a means of communication throughout the world, there are large differences among different cultures, religions, and societies, with some using smiles to convey confusion, embarrassment, or awkwardness. Smiles can not only be seen but heard when people talk.

== Evolutionary background ==
Primatologist Signe Preuschoft traces the smile back over 30 million years of evolution to a "fear grin" stemming from monkeys and apes, who often used bare clenched teeth to portray to predators that they were harmless or to signal submission to more dominant group members. The smile may have evolved differently among species, especially among humans.

== Social effects ==
Smiling seems to have a favorable influence upon others and makes one 'likable' and more 'approachable'. In the social context, smiling and laughter have different functions in the order of sequence in social situations:

- Smiling is sometimes a pre-laughing device and is a common pattern for paving the way to laughter;
- Smiling can be used as a response to laughter.

=== As reinforcement and manipulation ===
The influence of smiling on others is not necessarily benign. It may take the form of positive reinforcement, possibly for an underhand, manipulative or abusive purpose.

=== Vocal smiling ===
Smiles can be heard in speech without direct observation, as in "smile down the phone," and can play a role in voice-to-voice social interactions.

== Cultural differences ==
Researchers have found that smiling is more common in some cultures than other cultures. For example, smiles are more common in the U.S. and France than in China or Japan. This pattern has been found in posed photos, such as the smiles of political leaders in official pictures and of students in school ID photos. It has also been found when researchers observed rates of smiling in everyday life.

While smiling is perceived as a positive emotion most of the time, there are many cultures that perceive smiling as a negative expression and consider it unwelcoming. Too much smiling can be viewed as a sign of shallowness or dishonesty. In some parts of Asia, people may smile when they are embarrassed or in emotional pain. Some people may smile at others to indicate a friendly greeting. A smile may be reserved for close friends and family members. Many people in the former Soviet Union consider smiling at strangers in public to be unusual and even suspicious behavior; or even a sign of stupidity.

One systematic, large cross-cultural study on social perception of smiling individuals documented that in some cultures a smiling individual may be perceived as less intelligent than the same non-smiling individual (and that cultural uncertainty avoidance may explain these differences). Furthermore, the same study showed that corruption at the societal level may undermine the prosocial perception of smiling—in societies with high corruption indicators, trust toward smiling individuals is reduced.

There can also be gender differences. In the United States and Canada, women report men telling them to smile. For example, Greg Rickford, a member of the Canadian Parliament, told a female journalist to smile rather than answer the question she had asked. Biological anthropologist Helen Fisher states that, while this could be either caring or controlling behavior, such behavior is unlikely to be welcome. Often the reason given for this request is that it will improve the woman's appearance, further highlighting the gendered nature of smiling.

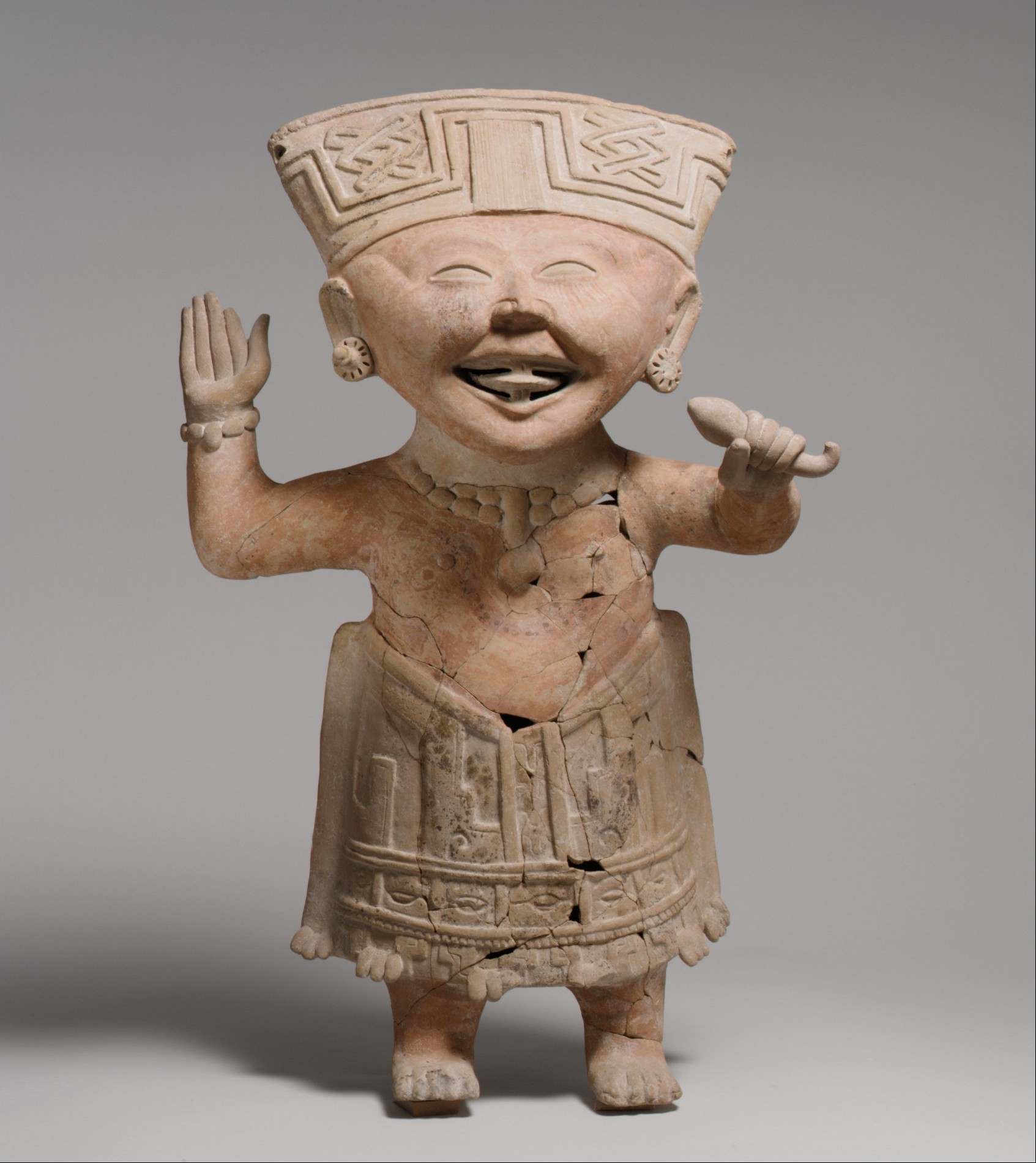
A sonriente ceramic figurine, 600 to 1000 CE, Classic Veracruz culture. Although their purpose is uncertain, the profusion of these smiling figurines is distinctive since depictions of such expressions are uncommon in other Mesoamerican cultures.

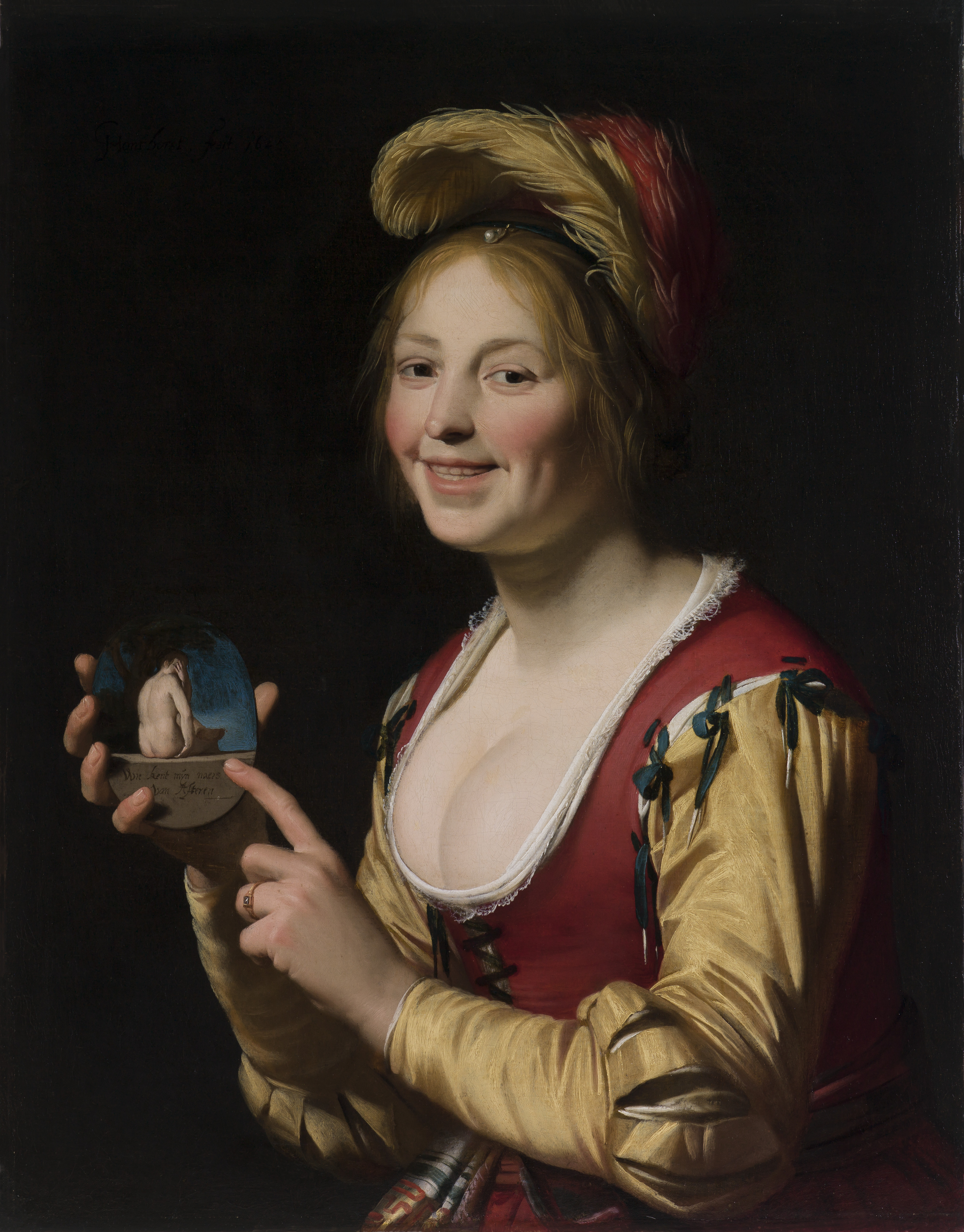
Smiling Girl, a Courtesan, Holding an Obscene Image (1625) by Gerard van Honthorst. Humor has been noted as a source of inspiration for many notable Dutch Golden Age painters.

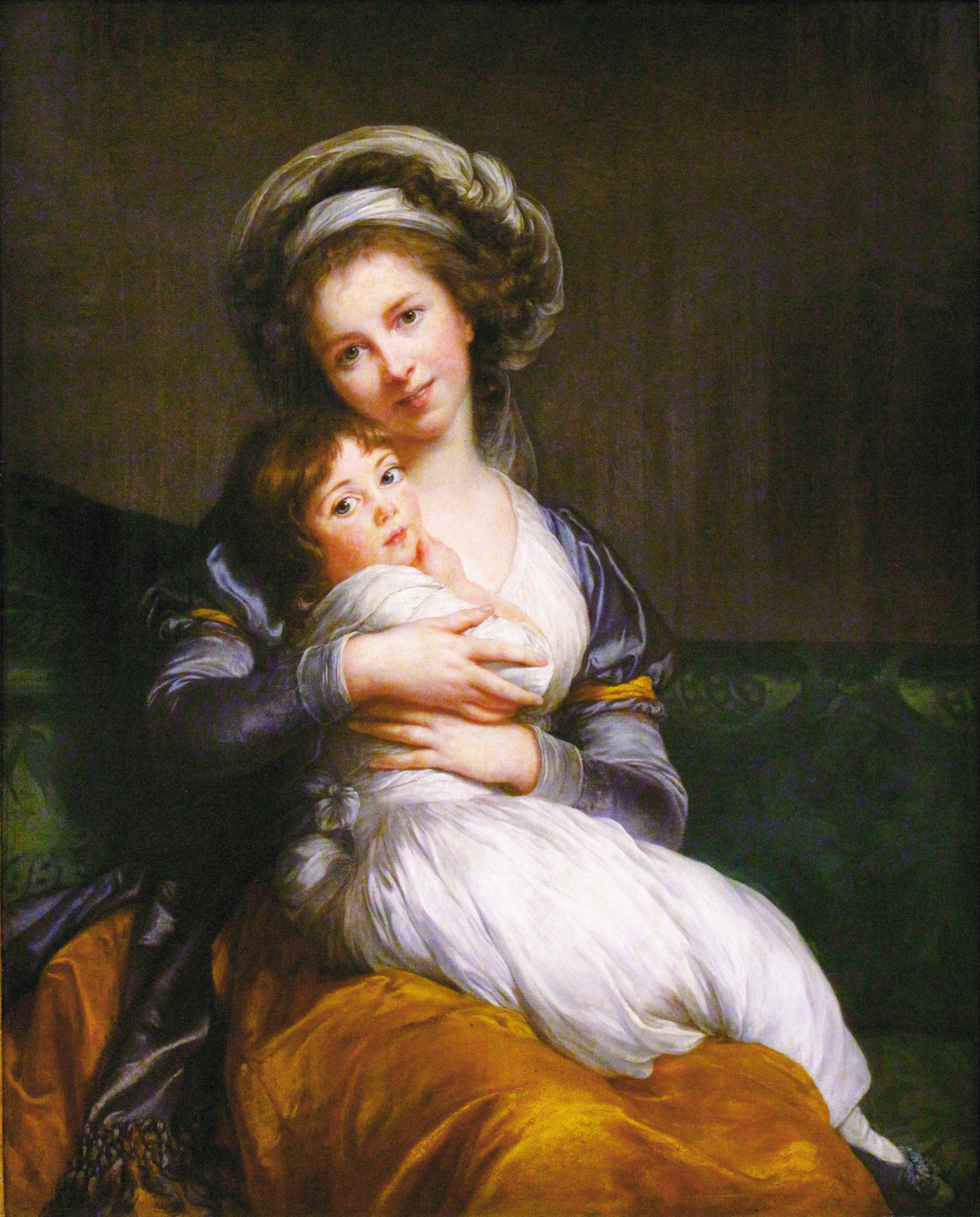
In her Self-portrait with her daughter Julie (1786), Élisabeth Vigée Le Brun painted herself smiling. When it was exhibited at the Salon of 1787, the court gossip-sheet Mémoires secrets commented: "An affectation which artists, art-lovers and persons of taste have been united in condemning, and which finds no precedent among the Ancients, is that in smiling, [Madame Vigée LeBrun] shows her teeth."

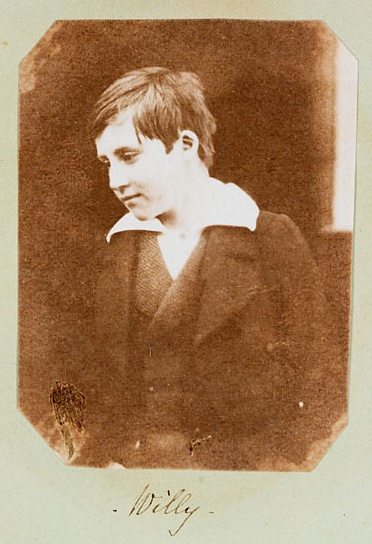
A photograph of a Welsh boy, William Mansel (1838–1866), titled 'Willy', smiling at something off camera. Taken c. 1853, it is the earliest known photograph of a smile. in the nineteenth century, Welsh Pioneers.

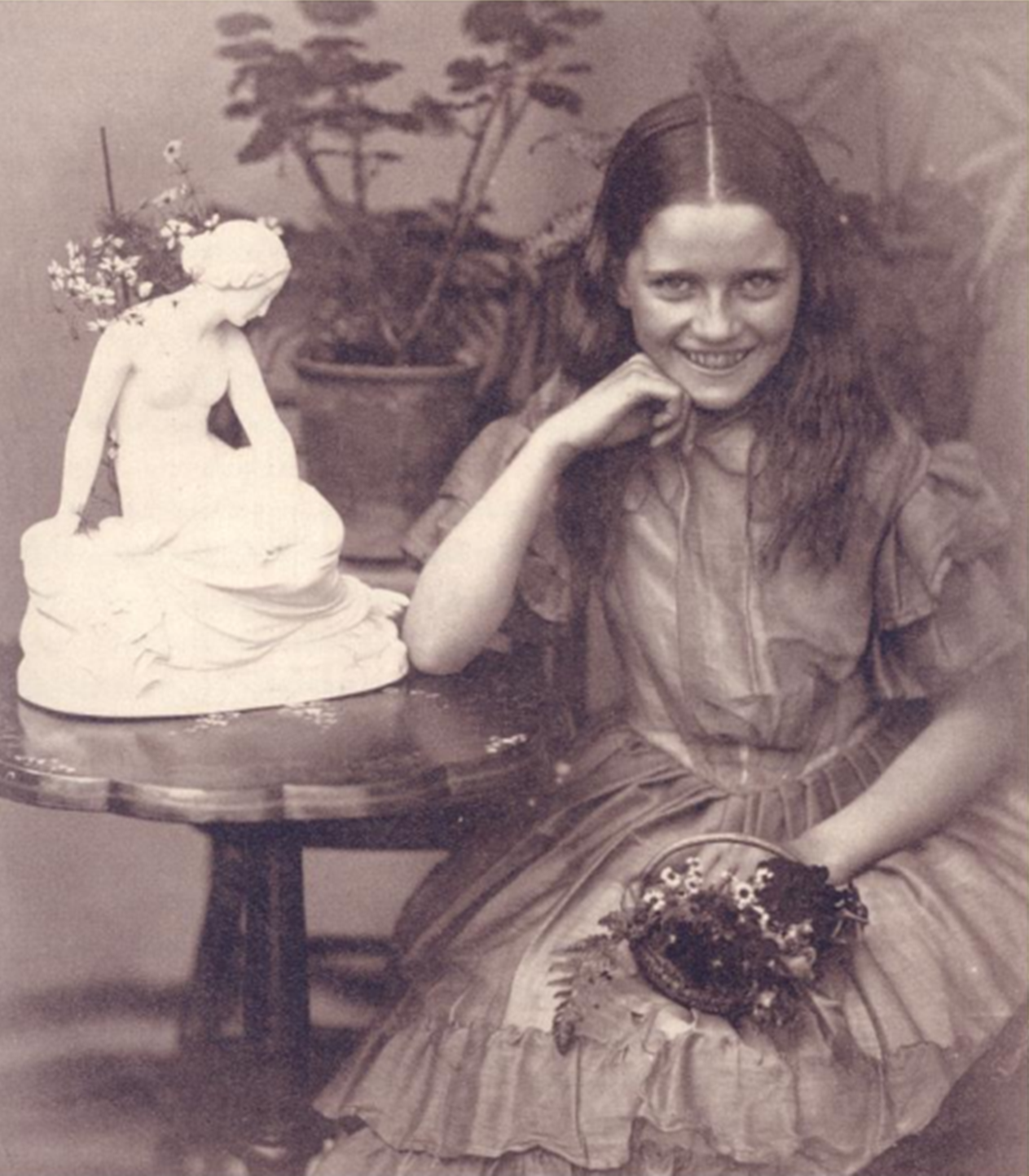
Photograph taken by Lewis Carroll titled "No Lessons Today" (1863), depicting a child's feelings when school holidays begin. Carroll later sent the photograph to Charles Darwin for possible use in his publication The Expression of the Emotions in Man and Animals.

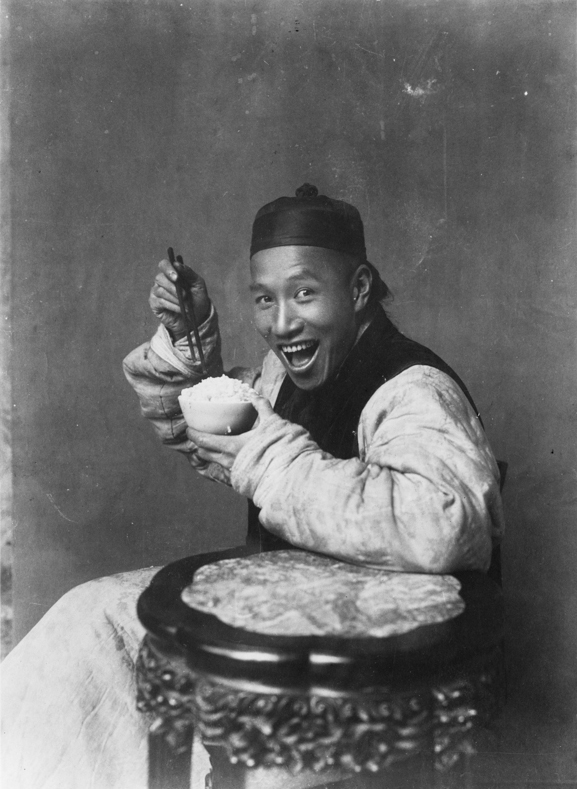
In the late 19th century and early 20th century, photographs taken in the United Kingdom rarely depicted people smiling, in accordance with the cultural conventions of Victorian and Edwardian society. In contrast, the photograph Eating Rice, China (1904) depicts a smiling Chinese man.

== Dimples ==
Cheek dimples are formed secondary to a bifid zygomaticus major muscle, whose fascial strands insert into the dermis and cause a dermal tethering effect. Dimples are genetically inherited and are a dominant trait. Having bilateral dimples (dimples in both cheeks) is the most common form of cheek dimples. A rarer form is the single dimple, which occurs on one side of the face only.

This bifid variation of the muscle originates as a single structure from the zygomatic bone. As it travels anteriorly, it then divides with a superior bundle that inserts in the typical position above the corner of the mouth. An inferior bundle inserts below the corner of the mouth. Dimples are analogous and how they form in cheeks varies from person to person. The shape of a person's face can affect the look and form as well: leptoprosopic (long and narrow) faces have long and narrow dimples, and eryprosopic (short and broad) faces have short, circular dimples. People with a mesoprosopic face are more likely to have dimples in their cheeks than any other face shape.

== Duchenne smile ==
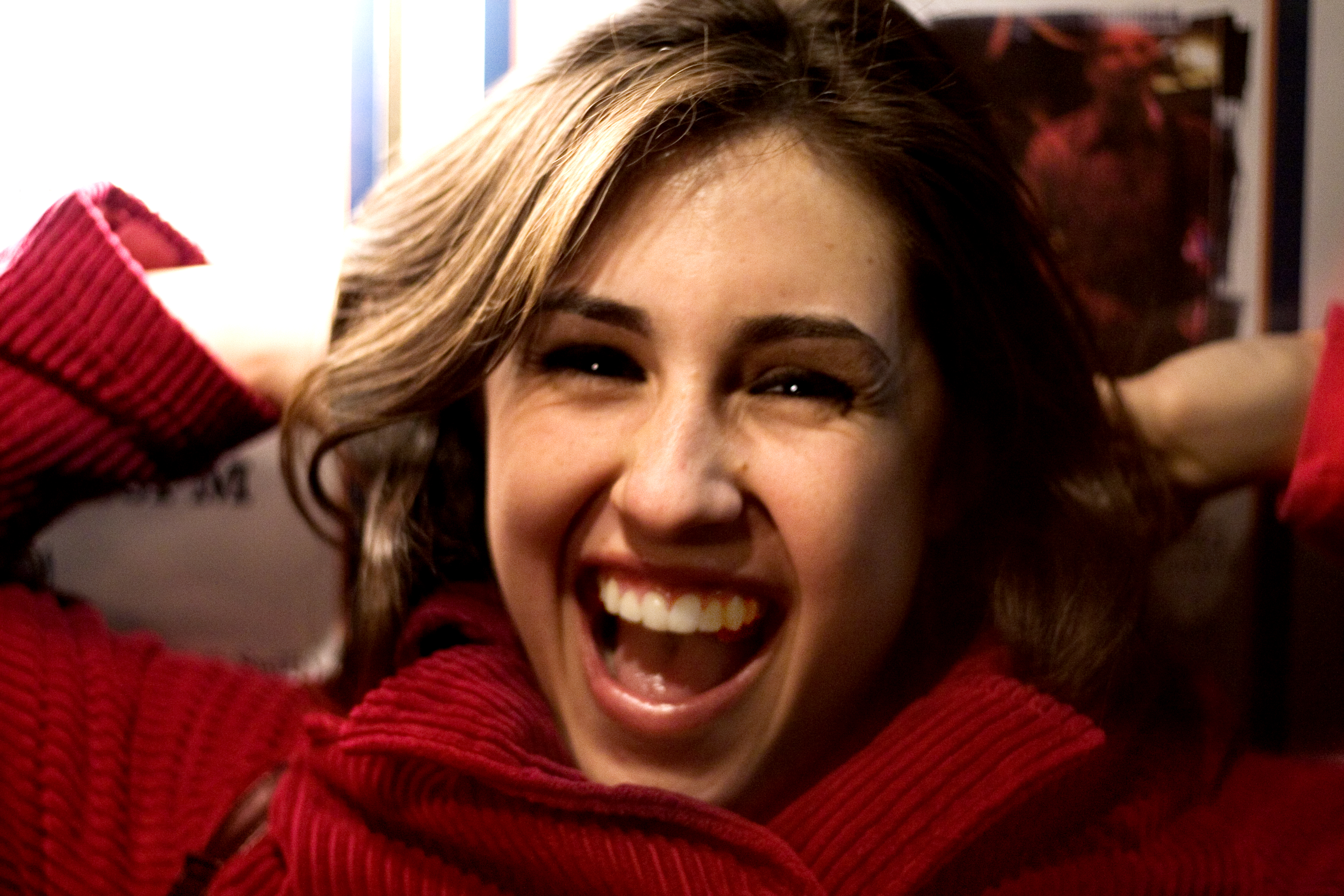
A Duchenne smile engages the muscles around the mouth and eyes.

While conducting research on the physiology of facial expressions in the mid-19th century, French neurologist Guillaume Duchenne identified two distinct types of smiles. A Duchenne smile involves contraction of both the zygomatic major muscle (which raises the corners of the mouth) and the orbicularis oculi muscle (which raises the cheeks and forms crow's feet around the eyes). The Duchenne smile has been described as "smizing", as in "smiling with the eyes".

== Non-Duchenne smile ==
A non-Duchenne smile involves only the zygomatic major muscle. According to Messenger et al., "Research with adults initially indicated that joy was indexed by generic smiling, any smiling involving the raising of the lip corners by the zygomatic major .... More recent research suggests that smiling in which the muscle around the eye contracts, raising the cheeks high (Duchenne smiling), is uniquely associated with positive emotion."

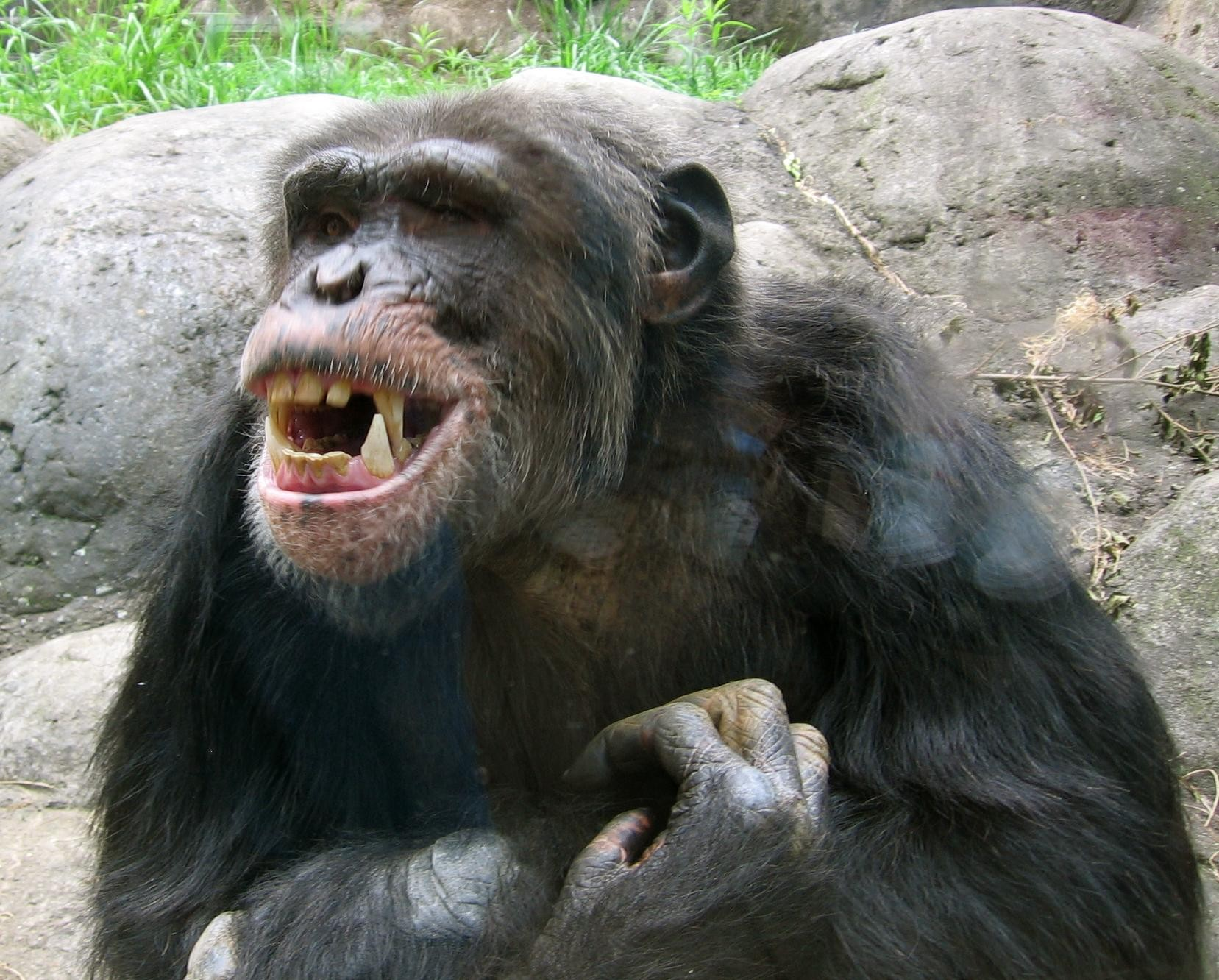
Chimpanzee "smiling" at Zoo Knoxville

The "Pan Am smile", also known as the "Botox smile", is the name given to a fake smile, in which only the zygomatic major muscle is voluntarily contracted to show politeness. It is named after the now-defunct airline Pan Am, whose flight attendants would always flash every passenger the same perfunctory smile. Botox was introduced for cosmetic use in 2002. Chronic use of Botox injections to deal with eye wrinkles can result in paralysis of the small muscles around the eyes, preventing the appearance of a Duchenne smile.

== Other animals ==
In other animals, the baring of teeth is often used as a threat or warning display—known as a snarl—or a sign of submission. For chimpanzees, it can also be a sign of fear. However, not all animal displays of teeth convey negative acts or emotions. For example, Barbary macaques demonstrate an open mouth display as a sign of playfulness, which likely has similar roots and purposes as the human smile.

== See also ==
- Facial Action Coding System
- Frown
- Say cheese
- Smiley
- Pleasure
- Praise
