= Orbicularis oris muscle =

Kissing muscles

Orbicularis oris
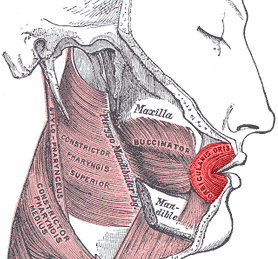

Details
- Origin: Maxilla and mandible
- Insertion: Skin around the lips
- Artery: Inferior labial artery and superior labial artery.
- Nerve: Cranial nerve VII, buccal branch
- Actions: It is sometimes known as the kissing muscle because it is used to pucker the lips.

Identifiers
- Latin: musculus orbicularis oris
- TA98: A04.1.03.023
- TA2: 2073
- FMA: 46841

In human anatomy, the orbicularis oris muscle is a complex of muscles in the lips that encircles the mouth. It is not a true sphincter, as was once thought, as it is actually composed of four independent quadrants that interlace and give only an appearance of circularity.

It is also one of the muscles used in the playing of all brass instruments and some woodwind instruments. This muscle closes the mouth and puckers the lips when it contracts.

== Structure ==
The orbicularis oris is not a simple sphincter muscle like the orbicularis oculi; it consists of numerous strata of muscular fibers surrounding the orifice of the mouth, but having different direction. It consists partly of fibers derived from the other facial muscles which are inserted into the lips, and partly of fibers proper to the lips. Of the former, a considerable number are derived from the buccinator and form the deeper stratum of the orbicularis.

Some of the buccinator fibers—namely, those near the middle of the muscle—decussate at the angle of the mouth, those arising from the maxilla passing to the lower lip, and those from the mandible to the upper lip. The uppermost and lowermost fibers of the buccinator pass across the lips from side to side without decussation.

Superficial to this stratum is a second, formed on either side by the caninus and triangularis, which cross each other at the angle of the mouth; those from the caninus passing to the lower lip, and those from the triangularis to the upper lip, along which they run, to be inserted into the skin near the median line. In addition to these, fibers from the quadratus labii superioris, the zygomaticus, and the quadratus labii inferioris intermingle with the transverse fibers above described, and have principally an oblique direction. The proper fibers of the lips are oblique, and pass from the under surface of the skin to the mucous membrane, through the thickness of the lip.

Finally, fibers occur by which the muscle is connected with the maxilla and the septum of the nose above and with the mandible below. In the upper lip, these consist of two bands, lateral and medial, on either side of the middle line; the lateral band m. incisivus labii superioris arises from the alveolar border of the maxilla, opposite the lateral incisor tooth, and arching lateralward is continuous with the other muscles at the angle of the mouth; the medial band m. nasolabialis connects the upper lip to the back of the septum of the nose.

The interval between the two medial bands corresponds with the depression, called the philtrum, seen on the lip beneath the septum of the nose. The additional fibers for the lower lip constitute a slip m. incisivus labii inferioris on either side of the middle line; this arises from the mandible, lateral to the Mentalis, and intermingles with the other muscles at the angle of the mouth.

== Clinical significance ==
Babies are occasionally born without one or both sides of this particular muscle, resulting in a slight droop to the affected side of the face.

== Additional images ==
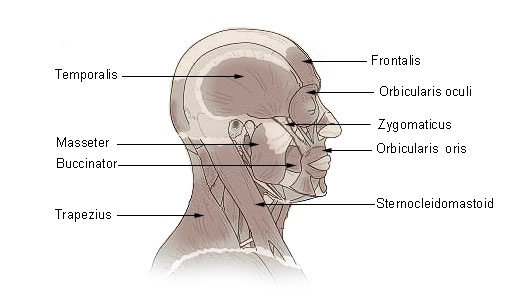
Muscles of head and neck

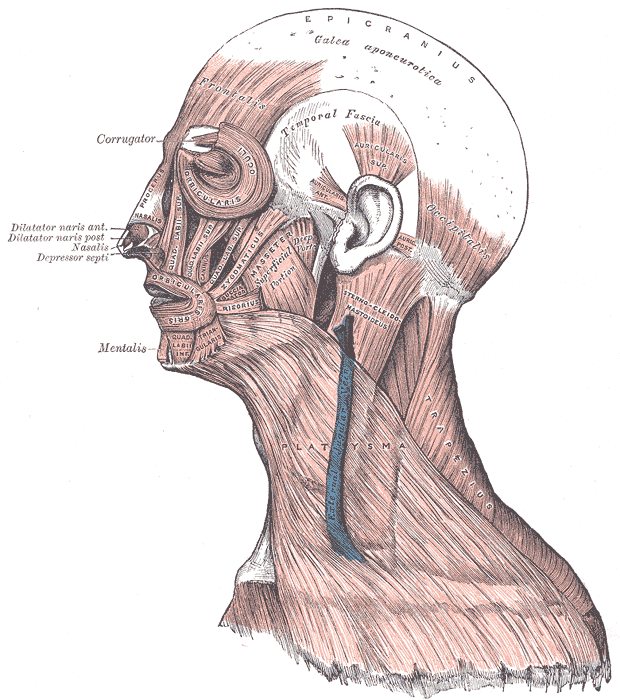
Muscles of the head, face, and neck

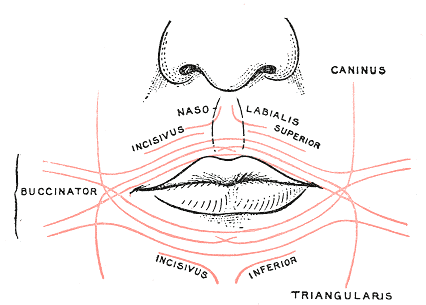
Scheme showing arrangement of fibers of orbicularis oris

== See also ==
- Snout reflex
