= Epicranium =

Collection of structures covering the cranium

The epicranium is the medical term for the collection of structures covering the cranium. It consists of the muscles, aponeurosis, and skin.

== Parts ==
The epicranial aponeurosis is a tough layer of dense fibrous tissue that covers the upper part of the skull.

The epicranial muscle (also called the epicranius) has two sections: the occipital belly, near the occipital bone, and the frontal belly, near the frontal bone. It is supplied by the supraorbital artery, the supratrochlear artery, and the occipital artery. It is innervated by the facial nerve.

The epicranium also includes the skin of the scalp and the layer of subcutaneous tissue below it.
