= Temporoparietalis muscle =

Muscle of the head

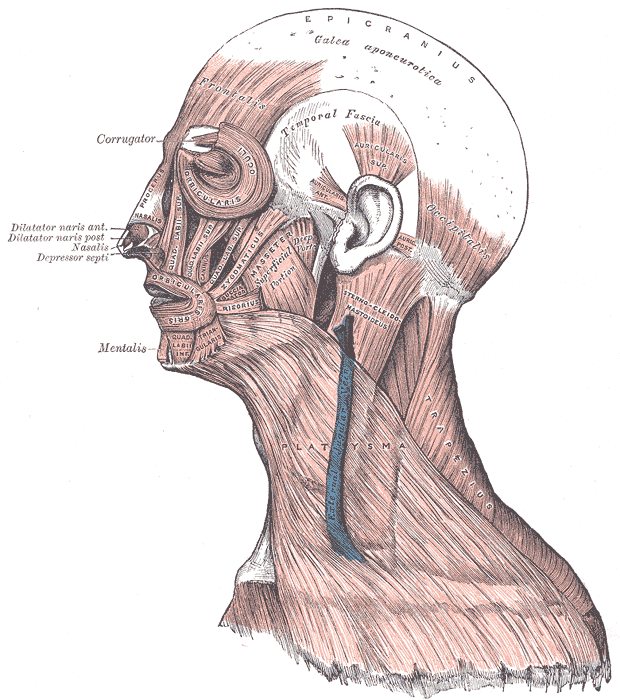
- Temporoparietalis muscle not labeled, but region is visible.

Details
- Origin: Auriculares muscles
- Insertion: Galea aponeurotica
- Nerve: Temporal branches of the facial nerve

Identifiers
- Latin: musculus temporoparietalis
- TA98: A04.1.03.006
- TA2: 2058
- FMA: 46753

The temporoparietalis muscle is a distinct muscle of the head. It lies above the auricularis superior muscle. It lies just inferior to the epicranial aponeurosis of the occipitofrontalis muscle. The temporoparietalis muscle may be used in reconstructive ear surgery.

The function of the muscle is to pull the scalp upward and slightly backward or laterally over the temples.
