= Ear wiggling =

Twitching of the external ear

Ear wiggling is movement of the external ear using the three muscles which are attached to it forward, above, and behind. Some mammals such as cows have good control of these muscles, which they use to twitch and orient their ears, but humans usually find this difficult.

== Voluntary movement in humans ==
Research conducted on humans using a kymograph to measure their ear movements found that only two out of twelve subjects had any voluntary control at the start, but that the others could acquire this by training with an early form of biofeedback.

Research in humans using electromyography found that 12 of 32 subjects from 15 countries were able to consciously signal intent by auricular activation with an average time required of 1.7 seconds.

== Involuntary movement in humans ==
Moving ear syndrome is a rare and treatable disorder in humans. It is an involuntary contraction of the external ear muscles that contribute to ear wiggling. This contraction can cause pain or discomfort. When sleeping or voluntarily movement occurs, it can temporarily decrease or disappear. The most effective therapy thus far is botox.

== In non-humans ==
Female rats wiggle their ears when they are in heat, to excite male rats and encourage them to mate.

== Pop culture ==
Ear wiggling was a shtick in Hal Roach comedies such as Laurel and Hardy and Our Gang. To achieve this effect, performers such as Stan Laurel would have their ears pulled by threads which would not be visible in the film.

== See also ==
- Oculo-auricular phenomenon
