= Temporoparietal fascia =

The temporoparietal fascia (or superficial temporal fascia) is a superficial fascia of the side of the head over the area of the temporal fossa situated superficial to the (deep) temporal fascia, and deep to the skin and subcutaneous tissue of the region.

== Anatomy ==
The temporoparietal fascia consists of a thin layer of connective tissue. It measures some 2-3mm in thickness.

=== Relations ===
The fascia unites anteriorly with the orbicularis oris muscle, and the frontalis muscle; it unites posteriorly with the occipitalis muscle. Inferior to the zygomatic arch, the fascia is continuous with the superficial muscular aponeurotic system; both structures are continuous with the platysma muscle of the neck, creating a single continuous fascial layer between the scalp superiorly and the clavicle inferiorly.

The fascia is situated superficial to the (deep) temporal fascia, with an intervening layer of (sources differ) avascular loose connective tissue (the innominate fascia) situated in the interval between the two fasciae; this structural arrangement of loose superficial layers and deep rigid layers confers a combination of mobility coupled with structural integrity to the region.

The superficial temporal artery and vein, and the auriculotemporal nerve course within or just deep to the temporoparietal fascia, and the frontal branch of the facial nerve (CN VII) courses within the fascia.

== Clinical significance ==
The temporoparietal fascia can serve as a donor tissue for reconstructive surgery. It affords reliable flaps with good blood supply when the tissues of the region are intact (however, prior lesions to the region may compromise the blood supply of the tissues; creating flaps from such compromised tissue is contraindicated due to a risk of subsequent ischaemic necrosis of the flap).
