= Scalp =

Area of the human head

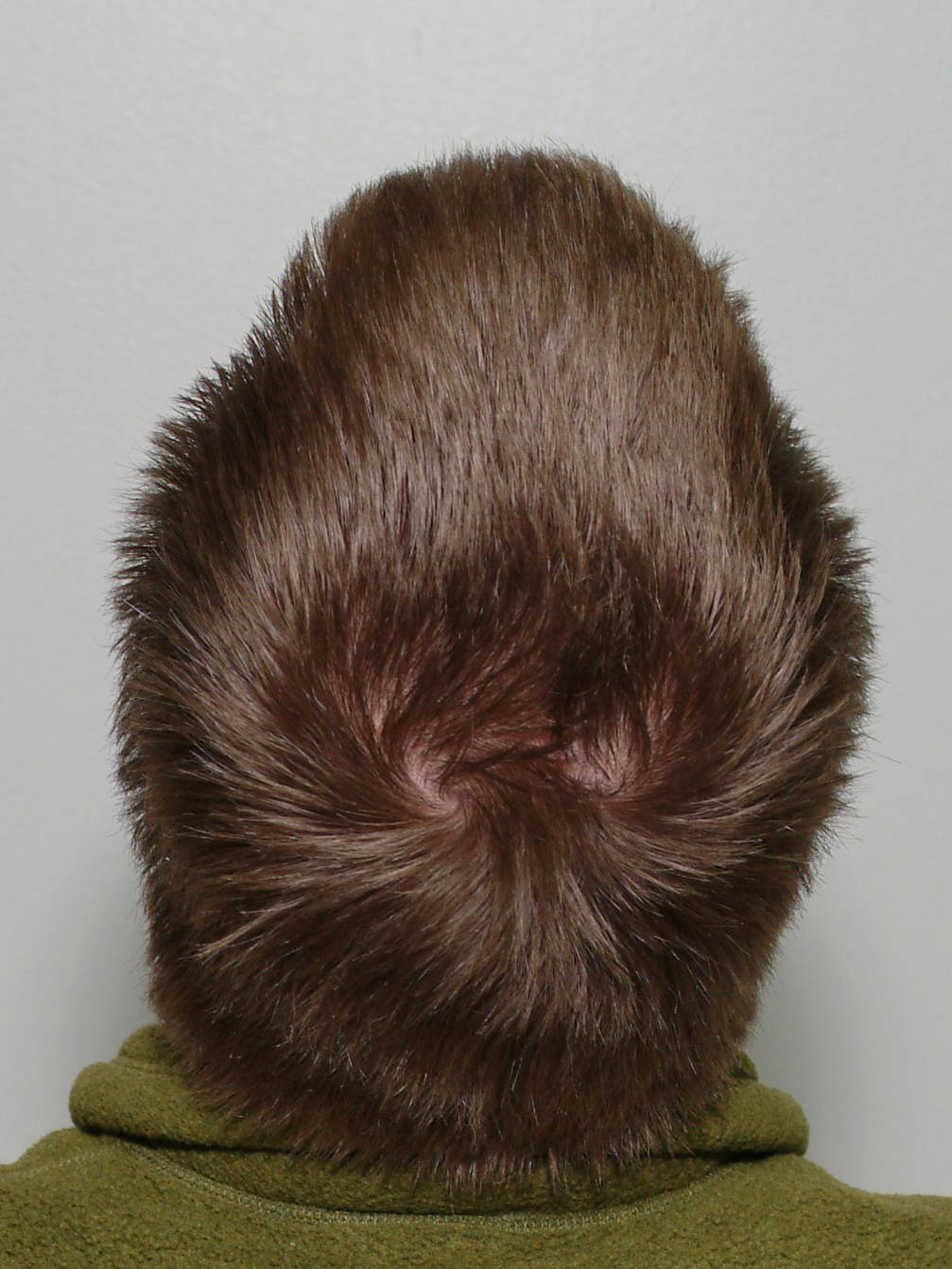
- Scalp

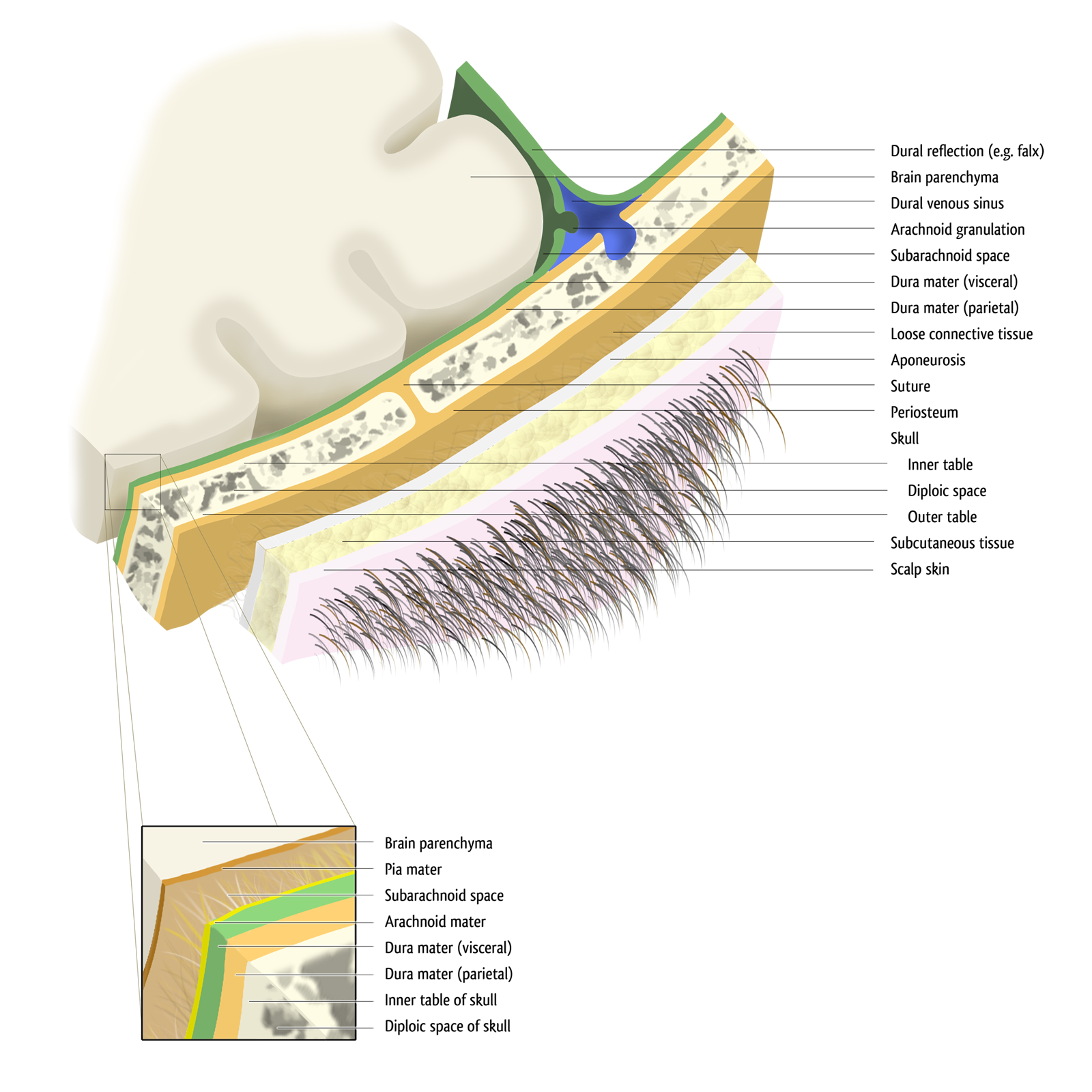
- Illustration depicting the layers of the scalp and meninges

Details
- Artery: Supratrochlear, supraorbital, superficial temporal, occipital
- Vein: Superficial temporal, posterior auricular, occipital
- Nerve: Supratrochlear, supraorbital, greater occipital, lesser occipital, zygomaticotemporal, auriculotemporal
- Lymph: Occipital, mastoid

Identifiers
- Latin: scalpus
- MeSH: D012535
- FMA: 46494

The scalp is the area of the head where head hair grows. It is made up of skin, layers of connective and fibrous tissues, and the membrane of the skull. Anatomically, the scalp is part of the epicranium, a collection of structures covering the cranium. The scalp is bordered by the face at the front, and by the neck at the sides and back. The scientific study of hair and scalp is called trichology.

== Structure ==
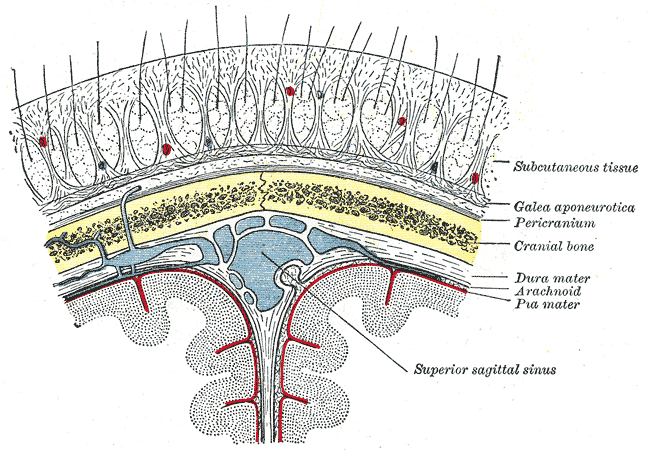
Diagrammatic section of scalp

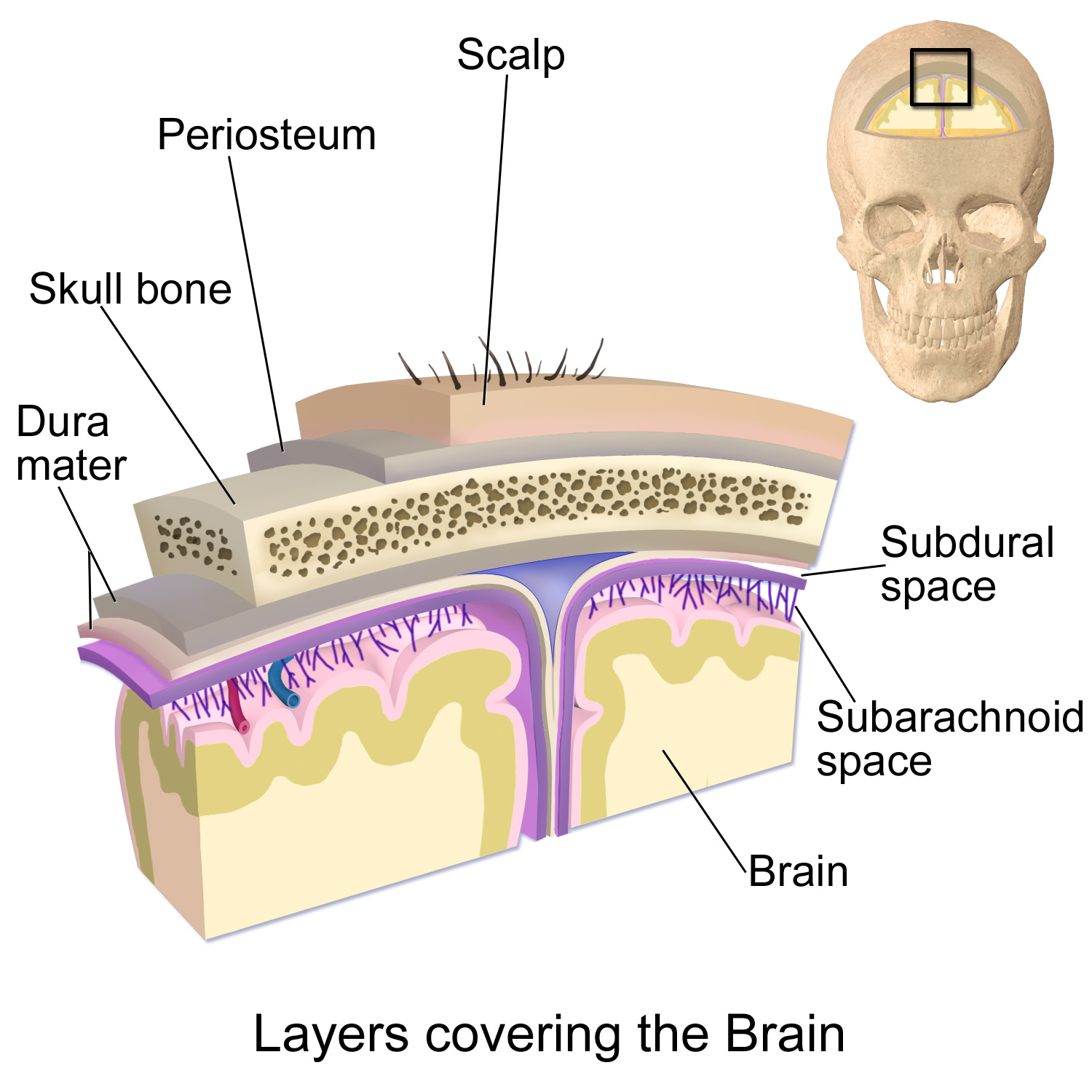
Illustration of the scalp and meninges

=== Layers ===
The scalp is usually described as having five layers, which can be remembered using the mnemonic 'SCALP':

- S: Skin. The skin of the scalp contains numerous hair follicles and sebaceous glands.
- C: Connective tissue. A dense subcutaneous layer of fat and fibrous tissue that lies beneath the skin, containing the nerves and vessels of the scalp.
- A: Aponeurosis. The epicranial aponeurosis or galea aponeurotica is a tough layer of dense fibrous tissue which anchors the above layers in place. It runs from the frontalis muscle anteriorly to the occipitalis posteriorly.
- L: Loose areolar connective tissue. This layer has a gel-like consistency, and allows the more superficial layers of the scalp to shift about in relation to the pericranium. It is constituted of more matrix than fibers. It contains random collagen I bundles, collagen III and is rich in glycosaminoglycans (GAGs). In craniofacial surgery and neurosurgery this layer provides an easy plane of separation between the upper three layers and the pericranium. In scalping the scalp is also torn off through this layer. The layer is sometimes referred to as the "danger zone" because infectious agents can easily spread through it to emissary veins which drain into the cranium.
- P: Pericranium. This is the periosteum of the skull bones, a membrane that provides nutrition to the bone and the capacity for repair. During surgery it can be lifted from the bone to allow the removal of windows of bone (craniotomy).

=== Blood supply ===
The blood supply of the scalp is via five pairs of arteries, three from the external carotid and two from the internal carotid:

- internal carotid
  - the supratrochlear artery to the midline forehead. The supratrochlear artery is a branch of the ophthalmic branch of the internal carotid artery.
  - the supraorbital artery to the lateral forehead and scalp as far up as the vertex. The supraorbital artery is a branch of the ophthalmic branch of the internal carotid artery.
- external carotid
  - the superficial temporal artery gives off frontal and parietal branches to supply much of the scalp
  - the occipital artery which runs posteriorly to supply much of the posterior aspect of the scalp
  - the posterior auricular artery, a branch of the external carotid artery, ascends behind the auricle to supply the scalp above and behind the auricle.

Because the walls of the blood vessels are firmly attached to the fibrous tissue of the superficial fascial layer, cut ends of vessels here do not readily retract; even a small scalp wound may bleed profusely.

Venous drainage The veins of the scalp accompany the arteries and thus have similar names, e.g. Supratrochlear and supraorbital veins, which unite at the medial angle of the eye, and form the angular vein, which further continues as the facial vein.

The superficial temporal vein descends in front of the tragus, enters the parotid gland, and then joins the maxillary vein to form the retromandibular vein. The anterior part of it unites with the facial vein to form the common facial vein, which drains into jugular vein, and ultimately to the subclavian vein. The occipital vein terminates to the sub-occipital plexus.

There are other veins, like the emissary vein and frontal diploic vein, which also contribute to the venous drainage.

=== Nerve supply ===
Innervation is the connection of nerves to the scalp: the sensory and motor nerves innervating the scalp. The scalp is innervated by the following:

- Supratrochlear nerve and the supraorbital nerve from the ophthalmic division of the trigeminal nerve
- Greater occipital nerve (C2) posteriorly up to the vertex
- Lesser occipital nerve (C2) behind the ear
- Zygomaticotemporal nerve from the maxillary division of the trigeminal nerve supplying the hairless temple
- Auriculotemporal nerve from the mandibular division of the trigeminal nerve

The innervation of scalp can be remembered using the mnemonic 'Z-GLASS' for Zygomaticotemporal nerve, Greater occipital nerve, Lesser occipital nerve, Auriculotemporal nerve, Supratrochlear nerve, and Supraorbital nerve.

The motor innervation of the scalp, specifically, the occipitofrontalis muscle, is split into two main factions: the frontal belly or frontalis muscle is supplied by the temporal branch of facial nerve, while the occipital belly or occipitalis is supplied by the posterior auricular branch of facial nerve.

=== Lymphatic drainage ===
Lymphatic channels from the posterior half of the scalp drain to occipital and posterior auricular nodes. Lymphatic channels from the anterior half drain to the parotid nodes. The lymph eventually reaches the submandibular and deep cervical nodes.

== Clinical significance ==
=== Infection ===
The 'danger area of the scalp' is the area of loose connective tissue. This is because pus and blood spread easily within it, and can pass into the cranial cavity along the emissary veins. Therefore, infection can spread from the scalp to the meninges, which could lead to meningitis.further studies are needed to conclude that it’s actually a “danger zone” though.

=== Injury ===
The clinically important layer is the aponeurosis. Scalp lacerations through this layer mean that the "anchoring" of the superficial layers is lost and gaping of the wound occurs which would require suturing. This can be achieved with simple or vertical mattress sutures using a non-absorbable material, which are subsequently removed at around days 7–10.

=== Hair transplantation ===
All the current hair transplantation techniques utilize the patient's existing hair. The aim of the surgical procedure is to use such hair as efficiently as possible. The right candidates for this type of surgery are individuals who still have healthy hair on the sides and the back of the head in order that hair for the transplant may be harvested from those areas. Different techniques are utilized in order to obtain the desired cosmetic results; factors considered may include hair color, texture, curliness, etc.

The most utilized technique is the one known as micro grafting because it produces naturalistic results. It is akin to follicular unit extraction, although less advanced. A knife with multiple blades is used to remove tissue from donor areas. The removed tissue is then fragmented into smaller chunks under direct vision inspection (i.e., without a microscope).

=== Disease ===
The scalp is a common site for the development of tumours including:

- Actinic keratosis
- Basal-cell carcinoma
- Epidermoid cyst
- Merkel-cell carcinoma
- Pilar cyst
- Squamous cell carcinoma

=== Scalp conditions ===
- Dandruff – a common problem caused by excessive shedding of dead skin cells from the scalp
- Head lice infestation
- Excoriation disorder – obsessive skin picking
- Trichotillomania – obsessive hair pulling
- Seborrhoeic dermatitis – a skin disorder causing scaly, flaky, itchy, red skin
- Cradle cap – a form of seborrhoeic dermatitis which occurs in newborns
- Trichodynia – burning scalp syndrome
- Tinea capitis - ringworm of the scalp, and its severe form Favus
- Cutis verticis gyrata – a rare deformity of the scalp

== Society and culture ==
The scalp plays an important role in the aesthetics of the face. Androgenic alopecia, or male pattern hair loss, is a common cause of concern to men. It may be treated with varying rates success by medication (e.g. finasteride, minoxidil) or hair transplantation. If the scalp is heavy and loose, a common change with ageing, the forehead may be low, heavy and deeply lined. The brow lift procedure aims to address these concerns.

Scalping is the act of removing a human scalp, usually with hair, as a trophy. Often associated with the history of North America, scalping developed independently on multiple continents and dates back to antiquity.

== See also ==
- Scalp reconstruction – surgery to correct scalp defects of injuries
- Scalp reduction – surgery to reduce the size of bald spots
