= Intertragic notch =

Part of ear

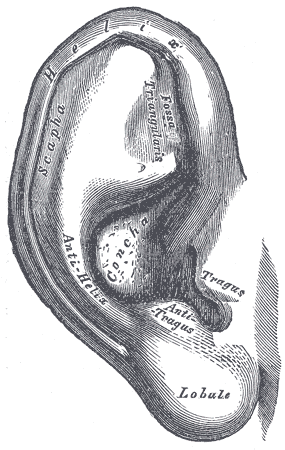
- The auricula. Lateral surface.

Details
- Part of: Ear

Identifiers
- TA98: A15.3.01.019
- TA2: 193
- FMA: 61175

The intertragic notch is an anatomical feature of the ears of mammals. In humans, it is the space that separates the tragus from the antitragus in the outer ear.

It is the point specified (although not by that name) in the U.S. Army's regulation governing the length of sideburns in male soldiers.
