= Corrugator supercilii muscle =

Muscle near the eye

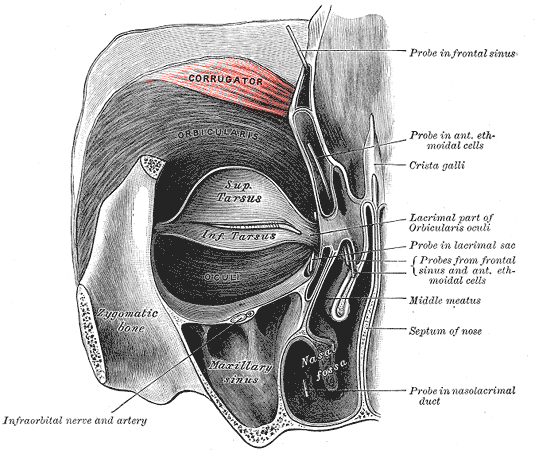
- Anatomical right orbicularis oculi muscle (notice the corrugator muscle at the top)

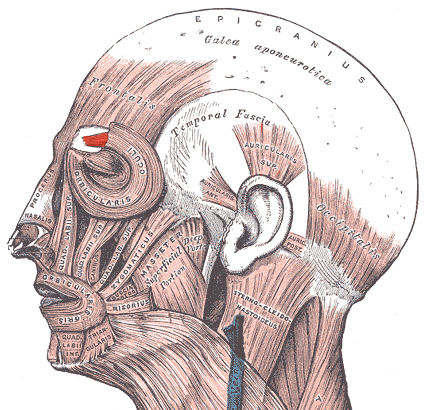
- Corrugator supercilii

Details
- Origin: Supraorbital ridge (superciliary arches)
- Insertion: Forehead skin, near eyebrow
- Artery: Ophthalmic artery
- Nerve: Facial nerve
- Actions: Wrinkles forehead

Identifiers
- Latin: musculus corrugator supercilii
- TA98: A04.1.03.018
- TA2: 2071
- FMA: 46794

The corrugator supercilii muscle is a small, narrow, pyramidal muscle of the face. It arises from the medial end of the superciliary arch; it inserts into the deep surface of the skin of the eyebrow.

It draws the eyebrow downward and medially, producing the vertical "frowning" wrinkles of the forehead. It may be thought as the principal muscle in the facial expression of suffering. It also shields the eyes from strong sunlight.

== Structure ==
The corrugator supercilii muscle is located at the medial end of the eyebrow. Its fibers pass laterally and somewhat superiorly from its origin to its insertion.

=== Origin ===
It arises from bone at the medial extremity of the superciliary arch.

=== Insertion ===
It inserts between the palpebral and orbital portions of the orbicularis oculi muscle. It inserts into the deep surface of the skin of the eyebrow, above the middle of the orbital arch.

=== Innervation ===
Motor innervation is provided by the temporal branches of facial nerve (CN VII).

=== Vasculature ===
The muscle receives arterial supply from adjacent arteries - mostly from the superficial temporal artery, and the ophthalmic artery.

=== Relations ===
It is situated deep to the frontalis muscle (of the occipitofrontalis muscle) and orbicularis oculi muscle, with which it partially blends. Its fibres are situated between the palpebral and orbital portions of the orbicularis oculi muscle.

The supratrochlear nerve passes between this muscle and the frontalis muscle.

== Function ==
The muscle acts in tandem with the orbicularis oculi muscle. The corrugator supercilii muscle acts upon the skin of the forehead superior to the middle of the supraorbital margin, drawing the eyebrow inferomedially to produce vertical wrinkles of the forehead just superior to the nose. It is the "frowning" muscle, and may be regarded as the principal muscle in the expression of suffering. It also contracts to prevent high sun glare, pulling the eyebrows toward the bridge of the nose, making a roof over the area above the middle corner of the eye and typical forehead furrows to shield the eye from excessively bright sunlight.

== Clinical significance ==
The muscle is sometimes surgically severed or paralysed with botulinum toxin as a preventive treatment for some types of migraine or for aesthetic reasons.

== Etymology ==
The name corrugator supercilii comes from Latin, and means wrinkler of the eyebrows.

== Additional images ==
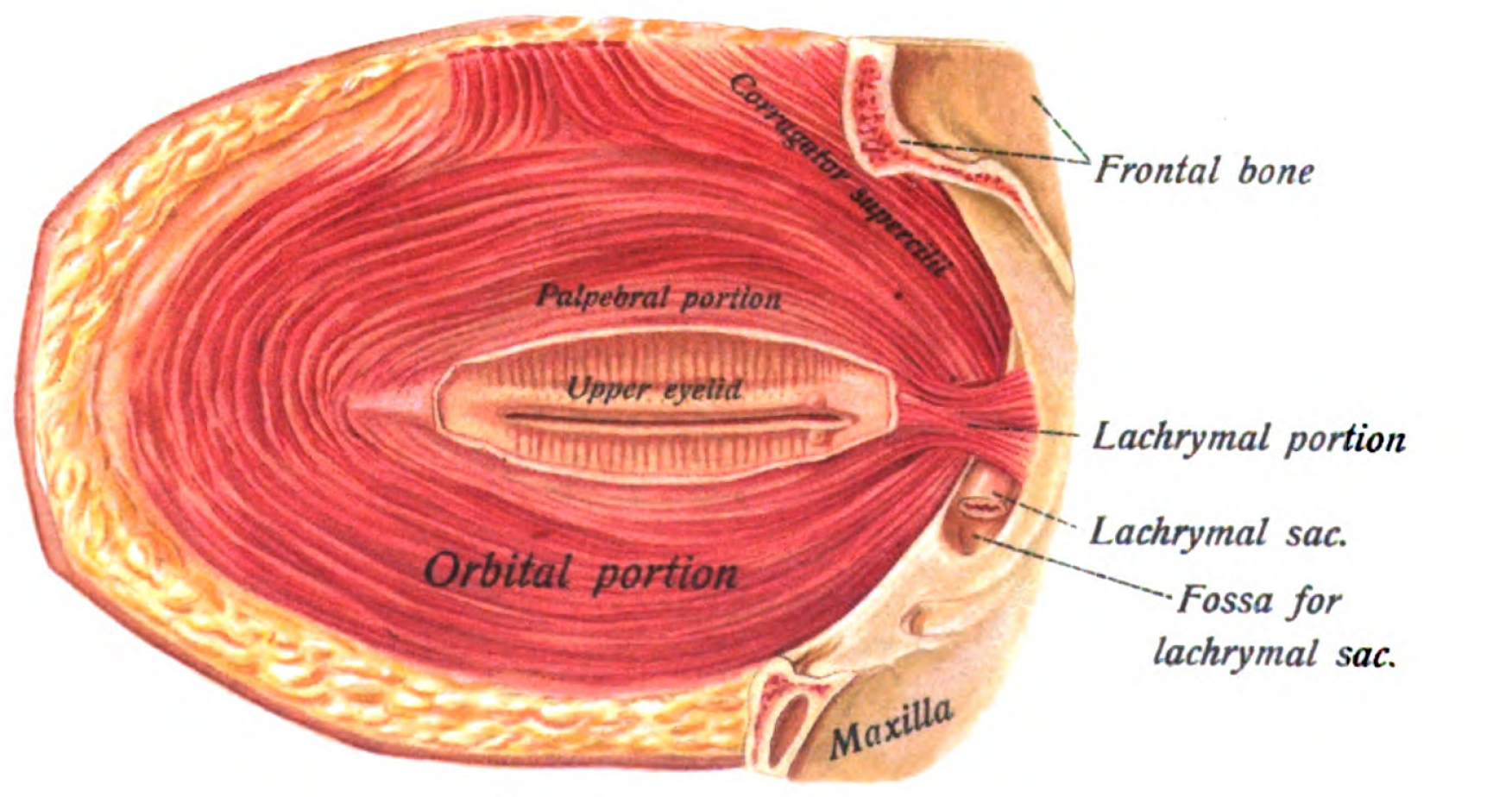
Corrugator supercilii seen from the inside.

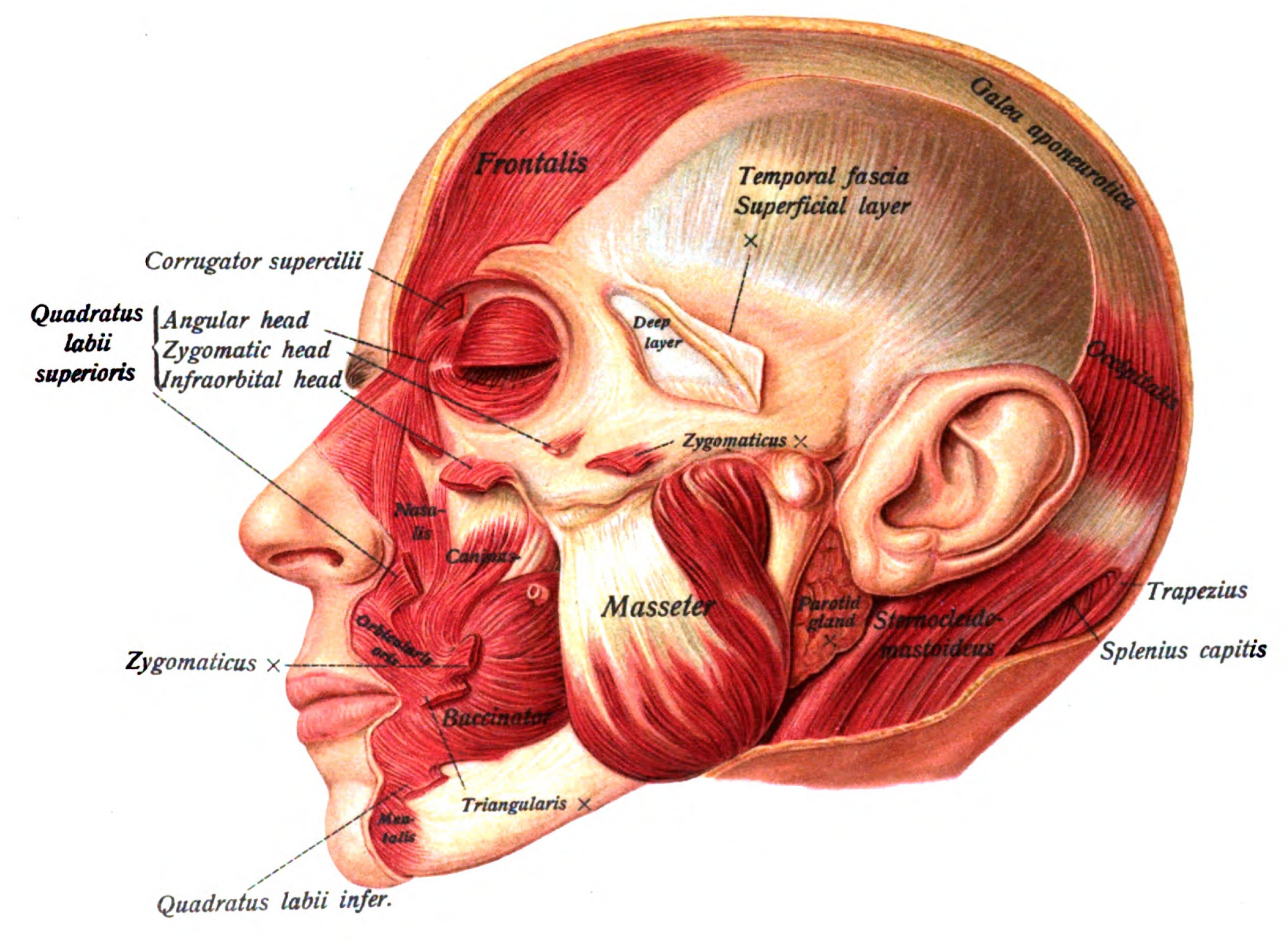

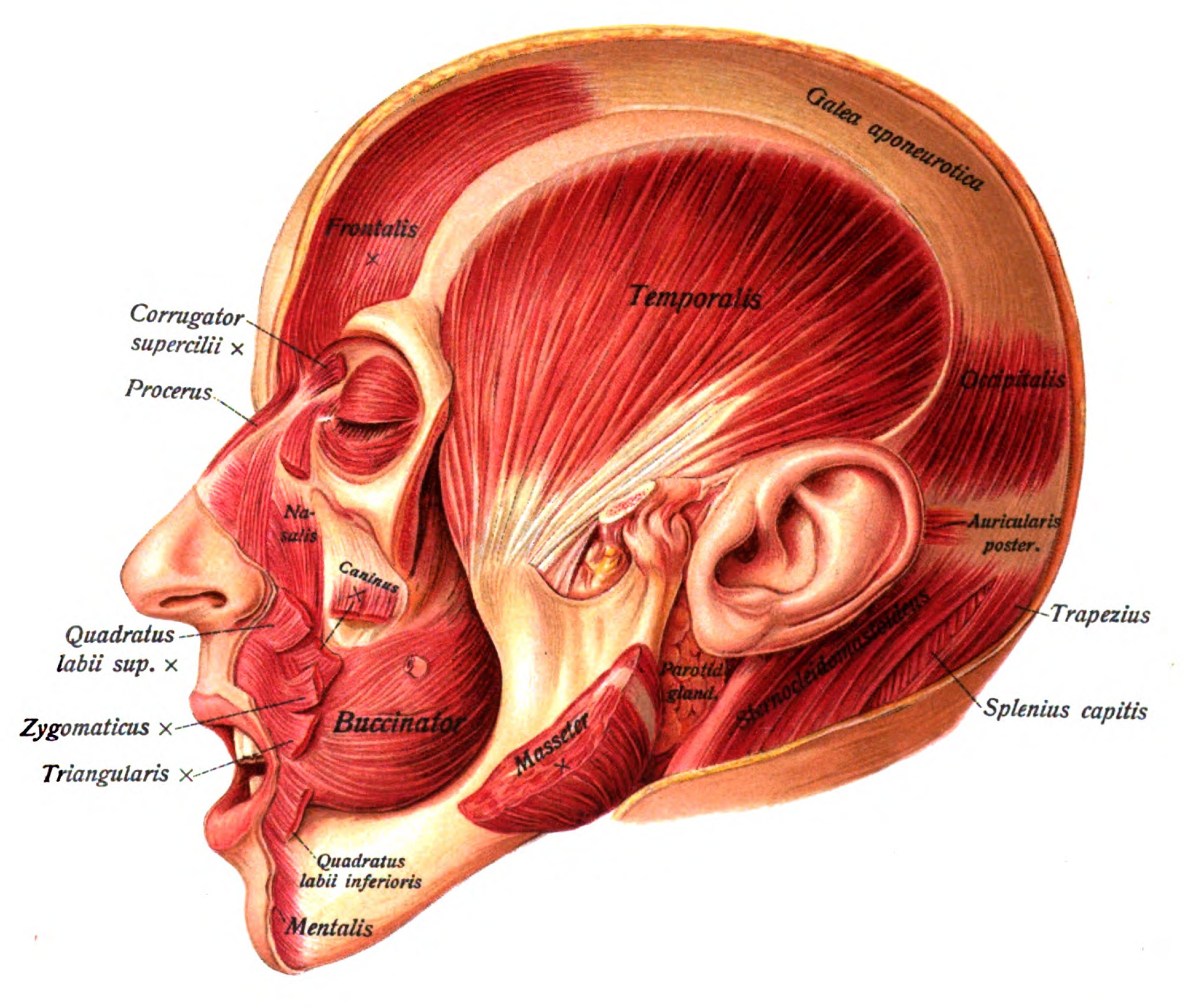

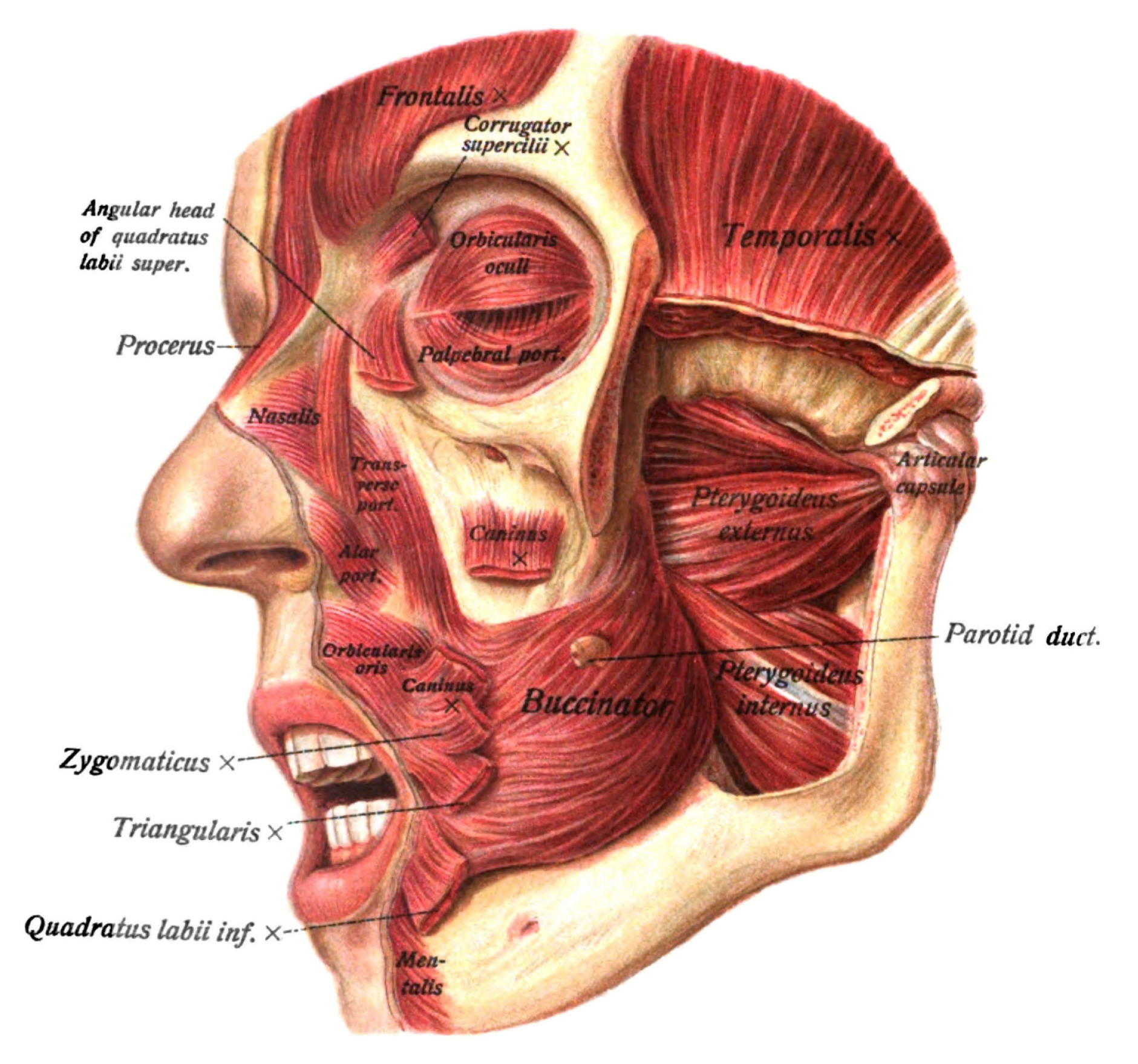

Position of corrugator supercilii muscle (red)

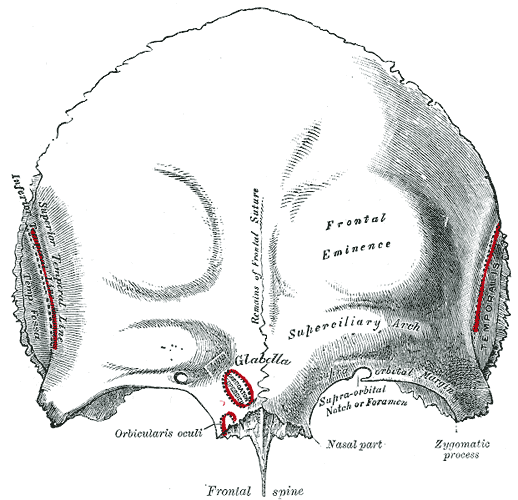
Outer surface of frontal bone.

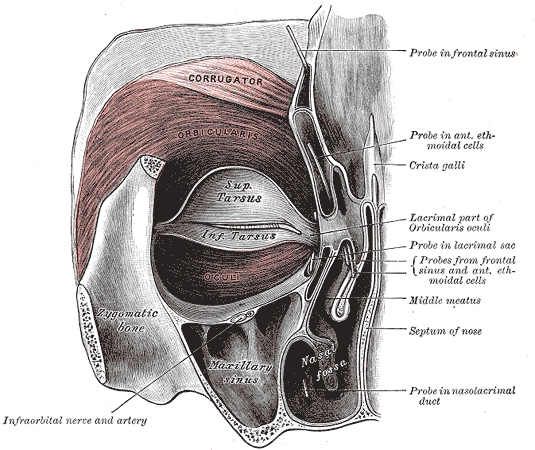
Visible on upper portion of face.
