= Aponeurosis =

Tissue which connects muscles to other organs

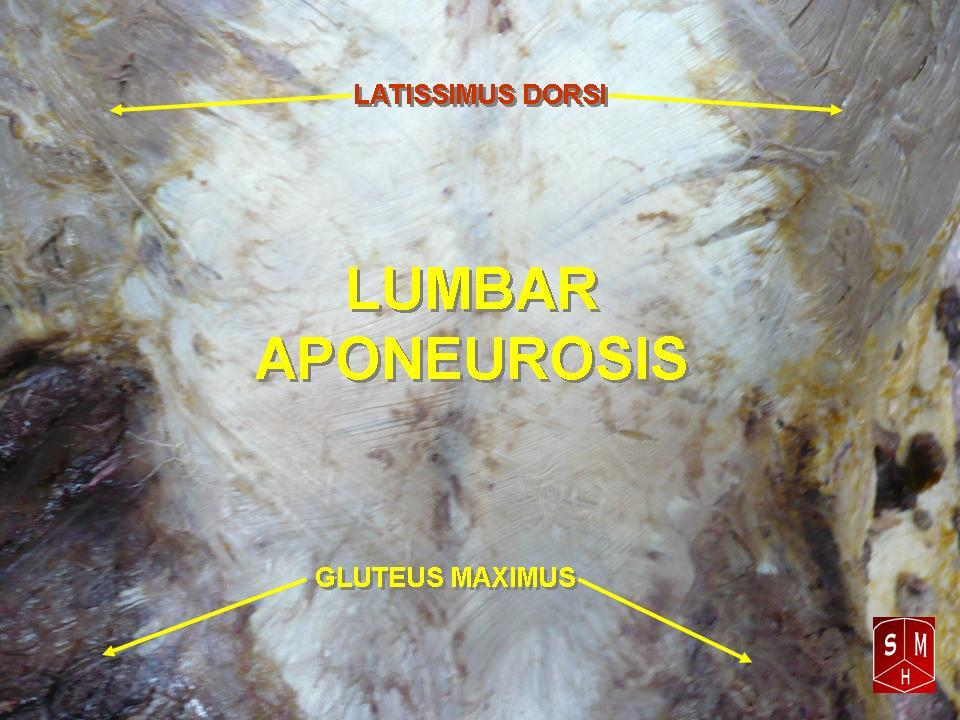
- Lumbar aponeurosis of the Visible Human Male

Details

Identifiers
- Latin: aponeurosis (plural: aponeuroses)
- MeSH: D000070606
- TA98: A04.0.00.047
- TA2: 2012
- FMA: 9722

An aponeurosis (/ˌæpənjʊəˈroʊsɪs/; pl.: aponeuroses) is a flattened tendon by which muscle attaches to bone or fascia. Aponeuroses exhibit an ordered arrangement of collagen fibres, thus attaining high tensile strength in a particular direction while being vulnerable to tensional or shear forces in other directions. They have a shiny, whitish-silvery color, are histologically similar to tendons, and are very sparingly supplied with blood vessels and nerves. When dissected, aponeuroses are papery and peel off by sections. The primary regions with thick aponeuroses are in the ventral abdominal region, the dorsal lumbar region, the ventriculus in birds, and the palmar (palms) and plantar (soles) regions.

== Anatomy ==
=== Anterior abdominal aponeuroses ===
The anterior abdominal aponeuroses are located just superficial to the rectus abdominis muscle. It has for its borders the external oblique, pectoralis muscles, and the latissimus dorsi.

=== Posterior lumbar aponeuroses ===
The posterior lumbar aponeuroses are situated just on top of the epaxial muscles of the thorax, which are multifidus spinae and sacrospinalis.

=== Palmar and plantar aponeuroses and extensor hood ===
The palmar aponeuroses occur on the palms of the hands. The extensor hoods are aponeuroses at the back of the fingers.
The plantar aponeuroses occur on the plantar aspect of the foot. They extend from the calcaneal tuberosity then diverge to connect to the bones, ligaments and the dermis of the skin around the distal part of the metatarsal bones.

=== Anterior and posterior intercostal membranes ===
The anterior and posterior intercostal membranes are aponeuroses located between the ribs and are continuations of the external and internal intercostal muscles, respectively.

=== Scalp aponeuroses ===
The epicranial aponeurosis, or galea aponeurotica, is a tough layer of dense fibrous tissue which runs from the frontalis muscle anteriorly to the occipitalis posteriorly.

=== Pennate muscles and aponeuroses ===
Pennate muscles, in which the muscle fibers are oriented at an angle to the line of action, typically have two aponeuroses. Muscle fibers connect one to the other, and each aponeurosis thins into a tendon which attaches to bone at the origin or insertion site.

== Function ==
Like tendons, aponeuroses attached to pennate muscles can be stretched by the forces of muscular contraction, absorbing energy like a spring and returning it when they recoil to unloaded conditions. Also serving as an origin or insertion site for certain muscles e.g latissimus dorsi.

== See also ==
- Aponeurosis of the obliquus externus abdominis
- Aponeurosis of the serratus posterior superior muscle
- Plantar aponeurosis
- Inguinal aponeurotic falx
- Bicipital aponeurosis
- Palatine aponeurosis
- Fascia
