= Oblique muscle of auricle =

Muscle of the outer ear

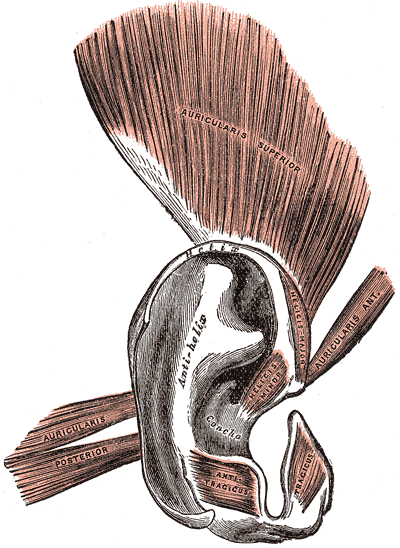
- The muscles of the auricula

Details
- Nerve: Posterior auricular nerve from the facial nerve

Identifiers
- Latin: musculus obliquus auriculae
- TA98: A15.3.01.044
- TA2: 2100
- FMA: 48986

The oblique muscle of auricle (oblique auricular muscle or Tod muscle) is an intrinsic muscle of the outer ear.

The oblique muscle of auricle is placed on the cranial surface of the pinna. It consists of a few fibers extending from the upper and back part of the concha to the convexity immediately above it.

== See also ==
- Intrinsic muscles of external ear
