= Scalp reduction =

- Specialty: Plastic surgeon

Scalp reduction is a surgical procedure in which the hairless region of the scalp of a bald person is reduced. This procedure can reduce the area of the scalp in which hair transplantation is needed or even eliminate the need for hair transplantation.

== History ==
Scalp reduction became very popular starting in the 1960s and, by the 1980s, was considered one of the most effective treatments for baldness. It is not commonly performed today, with around 5,000 men per year receiving hair transplantation instead of a full scalp reduction surgery. Scalp reduction may reduce the size of bald spots and treat baldness. The surgery can typically take 2–3 hours with around 250 hair grafts, with cases of severe baldness involving around 1,000 hair grafts.

== Candidates for surgery ==
- Hair loss due to genetics
- Healthy scalp
- Scalp elasticity
- Donor hairs (healthy hairs on the side and back of the scalp)
- Hair loss must be permanent

== After care ==
- Do not use cheap shampoo or conditioner
- Do not comb or brush the scalp
- Follow doctor's instructions
- Keep scalp moisturized
- Stay out of direct sunlight
- Do not pull the skin

== Risks ==
- Swelling
- Bleeding around skin flaps that were stretched
- Numbness and throbbing
- Rare case of infection
- Temporary hair loss
- Lack of blood flow and oxygen to the scalp tissue
- Scalp thinning
- Rare case of scarring
- Grafted area may not look as expected

== Associated cost ==
Pricing varies depending on the severity of the baldness. A straightforward scalp reduction procedure can cost over $2,000, with over $4,000 for a mild case, and up to $20,000 for a severe case of hair loss.

=== Health insurance ===
Health insurance will not pay for any type of hair loss surgery for cosmetic reasons, but they may elect to pay if the hair loss is caused by alopecia areata, accidents, or burns. Many offices offer payment plans to cover the surgery.

== Surgeons ==
Scalp reduction surgery is performed by a physician trained in plastic surgery and cosmetic surgery or dermatology. The surgery is performed in a hospital, outpatient office setting.

== Alternatives ==
- Wig
- Oral medication
- Lotion that contains prescription

Some recommend using lotions as a treatment for baldness before considering scalp reduction surgery. Non-surgical management may also be delivered through clinician-supervised telehealth services. The Hairy Pill is an Australian service providing personalised hair-loss treatment with ongoing medical review.

=== Non-surgical hair restoration ===
Low-level laser therapy can act as a form of non-surgical hair restoration, using laser light to stimulate follicles on the scalp. This process not only makes hair grow but also thickens the hair, which can increase its appearance.

== Hair loss ==
Hair loss is divided into the following:

=== Non scarring ===
- Alopecia areata
- Psoriasis

=== Scarring hair loss ===
- Scleroderma
- Lupus erythematosus
- Lichen planopilaris
- Bacterial or Fungal Infection

=== Genetic causes ===
- Male pattern hair loss
- Female pattern hair loss
- 20% of alopecia areata cases are thought to be transferred by genetics
