= Samuel Alexander Kinnier Wilson =

British neurologist

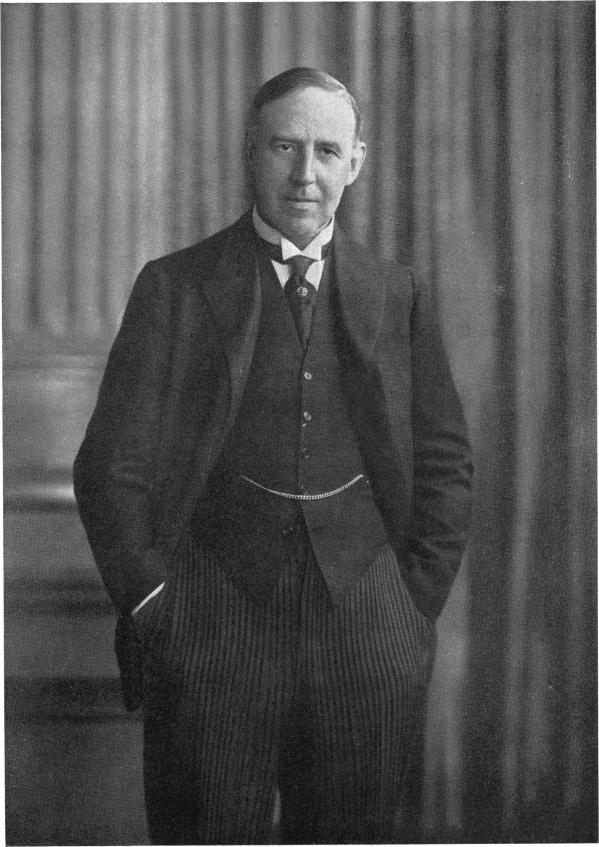
- Born: December 6, 1878; Cedarville, New Jersey, U.S.
- Died: May 12, 1937 (aged 58); London, England
- Known for: Wilson's disease Oculo-auricular phenomenon
- Children: James Kinnier Wilson

Samuel Alexander Kinnier Wilson (December 6, 1878 – May 12, 1937) was an American-born British neurologist. His research of hepatolenticular degeneration led the disease to be named after him as Wilson's disease. He was the father of British Assyriologist James Kinnier Wilson.

== Biography ==
He was born in Cedarville, New Jersey. A year after Wilson's birth, his father died and his family moved to Edinburgh. In 1902 he graduated with an M.B. from the University of Edinburgh Medical School, and during the following year he received his B.Sc. in physiology. Afterwards he traveled to Paris, where he studied with neurologists Pierre Marie (1853–1940) and Joseph Babinski (1857–1932). In 1905 he relocated to London, where he worked as registrar and pathologist at the National Hospital, Queens Square. Later, he was appointed professor of neurology at King's College Hospital.

Kinnier Wilson at Westminster Hospital was the first to be given a specialized neurological appointment at a general hospital ...

Wilson specialized in clinical neurology, and made important contributions in his studies of epilepsy, narcolepsy, apraxia and speech disorders. He described hepatolenticular degeneration in his Gold Medal winning M.D. dissertation of 1912 titled "Progressive lenticular degeneration" from the University of Edinburgh Medical School. He was honored for his research of the disease, and afterwards the disorder became known as "Wilson's disease". From his treatise, he is credited for introducing the term "extrapyramidal" into neurological medicine.

Wilson published several influential works in the field of neurology, and in 1920 was founding editor of the Journal of Neurology and Psychopathology, later to become known as the Journal of Neurology, Neurosurgery, and Psychiatry. In 1940, his two-volume work, Neurology, was published posthumously.

Just before his death, Sir Charles Sherrington (1857–1952) had been working with Dr. Edgar Adrian (later Lord Adrian of Cambridge, 1889–1977) on getting him elected as a Fellow of the Royal Society.
