= Oculo-auricular phenomenon =

The oculo-auricular phenomenon, first described by Kinnier Wilson in 1908, is the phenomenon of an extreme lateral gaze inducing a slight but perceptible backwards movement of the upper part of the pinna. It is a muscle synergy involving the Abducens innervated lateral rectus muscle, an external muscle of the eye, and the facial innervated posterior auricular muscle, an external muscle of the ear. Wilson's phenomenon had attracted attention at the time because of his renown and for its implications regarding Darwin's theory of natural selection. According to (Urban 1993), "In patients with brainstem disease abnormal transverse auricular muscle coactivation is characterized by absence of activity in one or both ear muscles during lateral gaze in either or both directions."
