= Anterior auricular muscle =

Muscle connectingthe epicranial aponeurosis to the helix of the ear

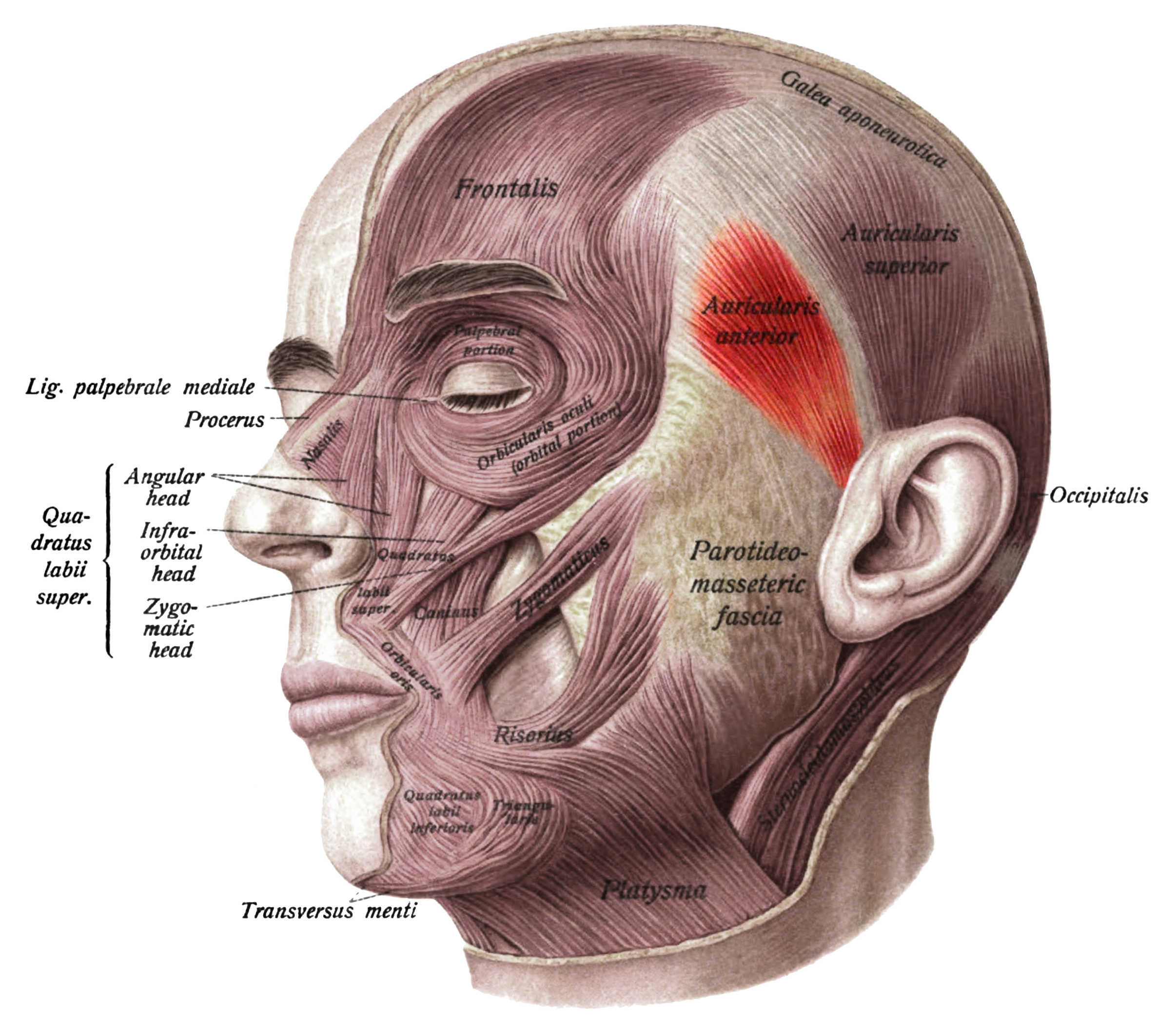
- Face and neck muscles. Anterior auricular muscle shown in red.

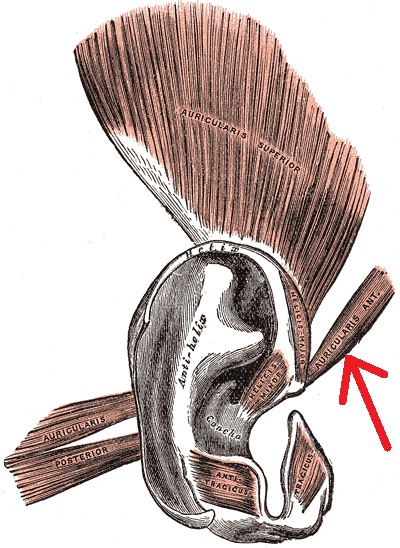
- The muscles of the auricula. Anterior auricular is at right (indicated by the red arrow).

Details
- Origin: Temporal fascia
- Insertion: Major helix (ear)
- Artery: Posterior auricular artery
- Nerve: Temporal branch of facial nerve
- Actions: Pulls ear forward

Identifiers
- Latin: musculus auricularis anterior
- TA98: A04.1.03.020
- TA2: 2089
- FMA: 46856

The anterior auricular muscle, the smallest of the three auricular muscles, is thin and fan-shaped, and its fibers are pale and indistinct. It arises from the lateral edge of the epicranial aponeurosis, and its fibers converge to be inserted into a projection on the front of the helix.

== Structure ==
The anterior auricular muscle arises from the lateral edge of the epicranial aponeurosis. It inserts into a projection on the front of the helix.

=== Nerve supply ===
The anterior auricular muscle is supplied by the temporal branch of the facial nerve (VII). It may also receive some small branches from the auriculotemporal nerve, a branch of the mandibular nerve, itself a branch of the trigeminal nerve (V).

=== Relations ===
The anterior auricular muscle is the smallest of the three auricular muscles.

The superficial temporal artery, a branch of the external carotid artery, travels underneath the anterior auricular muscle to supply the auricle of the outer ear.

== Function ==
The anterior auricular muscle draws the auricle of the outer ear upwards and forwards. This is a very subtle movement in most people, although some people can wiggle their ears.

== See also ==
- Superior auricular muscle
- Posterior auricular muscle

== Additional images ==
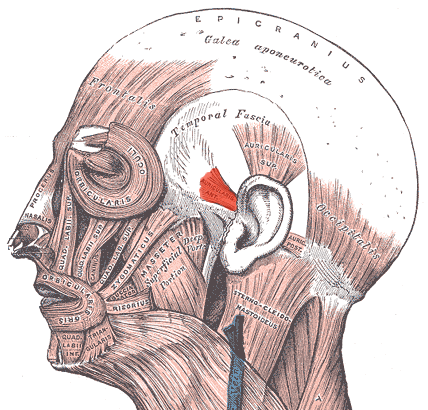
Auricula in context.
