= Hairline lowering =

Surgical technique

Hairline lowering (alternately, a scalp advancement or forehead reduction) is a surgical technique that allows an individual to have their frontal hairline advanced certain distances depending on variables such as pre-operative hairline height, scalp laxity, and patient preference. It can be used to address a congenitally high hairline or sometimes a hairline that has recessed from hair loss. It is performed mostly on women.

Hairline lowering surgery is also recommended to many patients undergoing facial feminization surgery (FFS). The shape of the hairline is altered, creating a low, feminine hairline. For MTF (male to female) patients who a have very prominent brow ridge, brow bone shaving may be performed additionally.

== Scalp laxity ==
Satisfactory hairline lowering is a balance between patient expectations and anatomical limitations. Scalp laxity is a primary determinant of extent of hairline advancement. When scalp laxity is insufficient for the desired amount of advancement, use of tissue expanders can greatly increase the possible advancement.

== Surgery ==
Hairline lowering is typically performed on an outpatient basis with local anesthesia and intravenous sedation. The surgeon marks the anticipated postoperative hairline prior to surgery. The new hairline can be tailored to the patient's preferences and is often wavy to mimic a natural hairline. During the surgery, the excess forehead and/or scalp is excised and the scalp is advanced to the new hairline. The incisions are made in such a manner (trichophytic) so that hair regrows through and in front of the eventual hairline scar making it undetectable. The scalp has to be separated from the skull going far back almost to the neck. Additional scalp advancement can be achieved by incising the galea (the deep fibrous inelastic scalp layer) which allows the scalp to stretch. Sometimes the surgeon will use implantable devices or sutures to secure the scalp to the bone at its new forward location. The surgeon will usually close the wound with two layers of sutures or surgical clips.

== Complications and other considerations ==
The resultant scar from hairline advancement is typically hidden by regrowth of hair; in some cases with cowlicks, the scar can be seen. In such cases hair transplants can totally disguise the scar. In males with progressive baldness, the surgical scar may become more visible as balding advances. Hair thinning from "shock loss" can occur and is usually temporary. Infections are rare. Follicular unit hair transplants can be done as an alternative treatment although the results take up to two years to get enough hair length and density to compare with the near instantaneous results of the hairline lowering operation.
