= Posterior auricular nerve =

Nerve of the head

Posterior Auricular Nerve
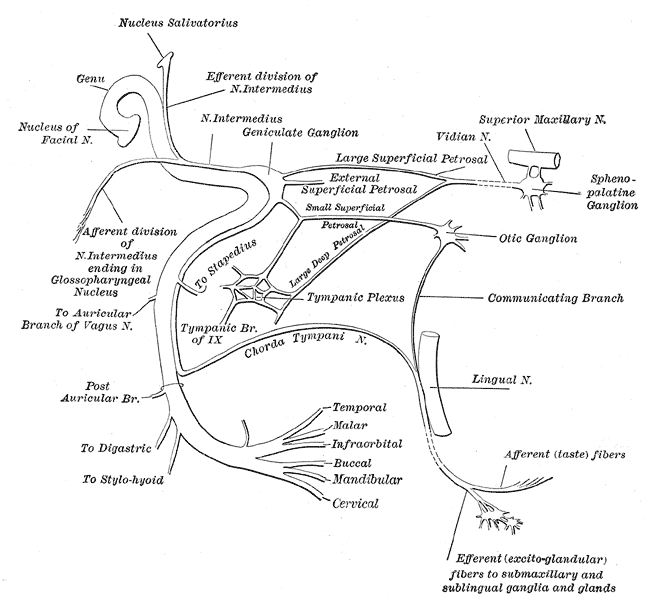
- Plan of the facial and intermediate nerves and their communication with other nerves. (Post. auricular br. labeled at bottom left.)

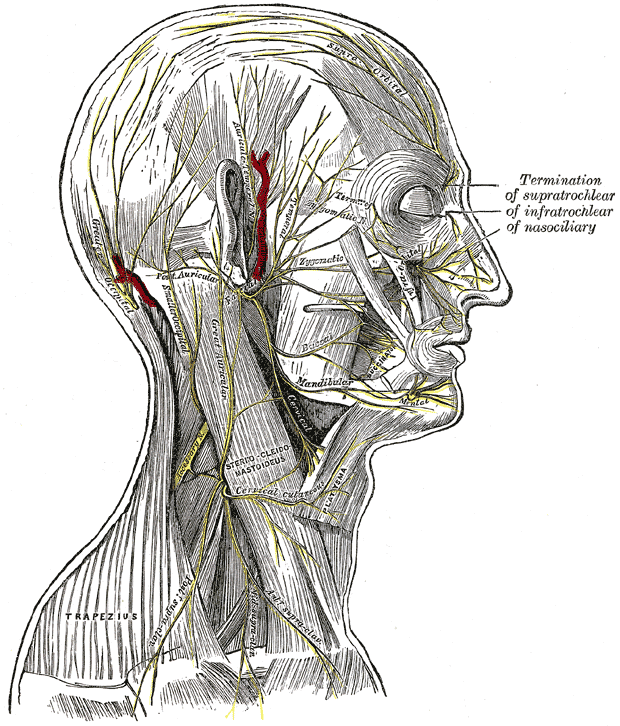
- The nerves of the scalp, face, and side of neck. (Post. auricular visible near center, behind ear.)

Details
- From: Facial nerve
- Innervates: Posterior auricular muscle, occipitalis muscle (posterior part of occipitofrontalis)

Identifiers
- Latin: n. auricularis posterior
- TA98: A14.2.01.102
- TA2: 6295
- FMA: 53278

The posterior auricular nerve is a nerve of the head. It is a branch of the facial nerve (CN VII). It communicates with branches from the vagus nerve, the great auricular nerve, and the lesser occipital nerve. Its auricular branch supplies the posterior auricular muscle, the intrinsic muscles of the auricle, and gives sensation to the auricle. Its occipital branch supplies the occipitalis muscle.

== Structure ==
The posterior auricular nerve arises from the facial nerve (CN VII). It is the first branch outside of the skull. This origin is close to the stylomastoid foramen. It runs upward in front of the mastoid process. It is joined by a branch from the auricular branch of the vagus nerve (CN X). It communicates with the posterior branch of the great auricular nerve, as well as with the lesser occipital nerve.

As it ascends between the external acoustic meatus and mastoid process it divides into auricular and occipital branches.

- The auricular branch travels to the posterior auricular muscle and the intrinsic muscles on the cranial surface of the auricule.
- The occipital branch, the larger branch, passes backward along the superior nuchal line of the occipital bone to the occipitalis muscle.

== Function ==
The posterior auricular nerve supplies the posterior auricular muscle, and the intrinsic muscles of the auricle. It gives sensation to the auricle. It also supplies the occipitalis muscle.

== Clinical significance ==
=== Nerve testing ===
The posterior auricular nerve can be tested by contraction of the occipitalis muscle, and by sensation in the auricle. This testing is rarely performed.

=== Biopsy ===
The posterior auricular nerve can be biopsied. This can be used to test for leprosy, which can be important in diagnosis.

== See also ==
- posterior auricular artery
