= Occipitofrontalis muscle =

Facial muscle helping to create facial expressions

Occipitofrontalis
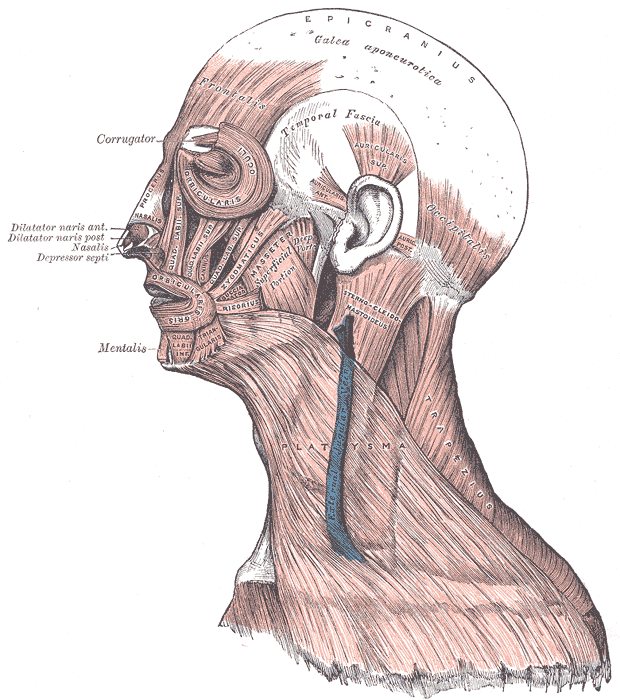

Details
- Origin: Two occipital bellies and two frontal bellies.
- Insertion: Epicranial aponeurosis
- Artery: Frontal belly: supraorbital and supratrochlear arteries Occipital belly: occipital artery
- Nerve: Facial nerve
- Actions: Raises eyebrows, wrinkles forehead

Identifiers
- Latin: musculus occipitofrontalis or musculus epicranii venter frontalis
- TA98: A04.1.03.003
- TA2: 2055
- FMA: 9624

The occipitofrontalis muscle (epicranius muscle) is a muscle which covers parts of the skull. It consists of two parts or bellies: the occipital belly, near the occipital bone, and the frontal belly, near the frontal bone. It is supplied by the supraorbital artery, the supratrochlear artery, and the occipital artery. It is innervated by the facial nerve. In humans, the occipitofrontalis helps to create facial expressions.

== Structure ==
The occipitofrontalis muscle consists of two parts or bellies:

- the occipital belly, near the occipital bone. It originates on the lateral two-thirds of the highest nuchal line, and on the mastoid process of the temporal bone. It inserts into the epicranial aponeurosis.
- the frontal belly, near the frontal bone. It originates from an intermediate tendon that connects to the occipital belly. It inserts in the fascia of the facial muscles and in the skin above the eyes and nose.

Some sources consider the occipital and frontal bellies to be two distinct muscles. However, Terminologia Anatomica currently classifies it as a single muscle, and also includes the temporoparietalis muscle as part of the epicranius.

The occipitofrontalis muscle receives blood from several arteries. The frontal belly receives blood from the supraorbital and supratrochlear arteries, while the occipital belly receives blood from the occipital artery.

=== Nerve supply ===
The occipitofrontalis muscle is innervated by the facial nerve. Branches of the supraorbital nerve pass through the occipitofrontalis muscle without innervating it to innervate the lambdoid suture.

== Function ==
The occipitofrontalis muscle helps to create facial expressions. Assisted by the occipital belly, the frontal belly draws the scalp back, which raises the eyebrows and wrinkles the forehead.

== Clinical significance ==
Damage to the facial nerve can cause atony of the occipitofrontalis muscle.

== Other animals ==
In humans, the occipitofrontalis only serves for facial expressions. In other apes, however, the head is not balanced on the vertebral column, and apes therefore need strong muscles that pull back on the skull and prominent supraorbital ridges for the attachment of these muscles.

== See also ==
- Epicranium
