= Superior auricular muscle =

Muscle that draws the auricle of the outer ear upwards

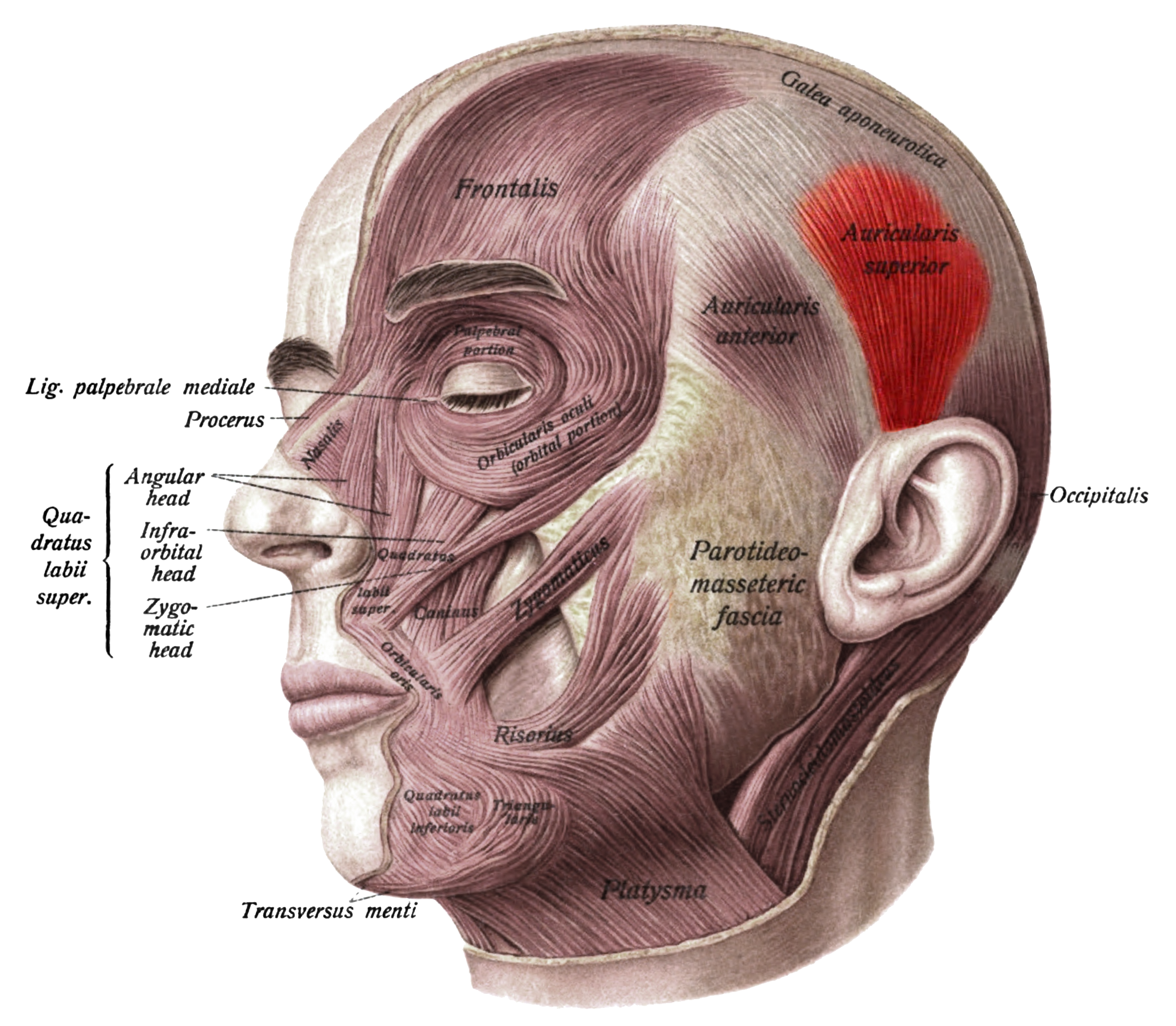
- Face and neck muscles. Superior auricular muscle shown in red.

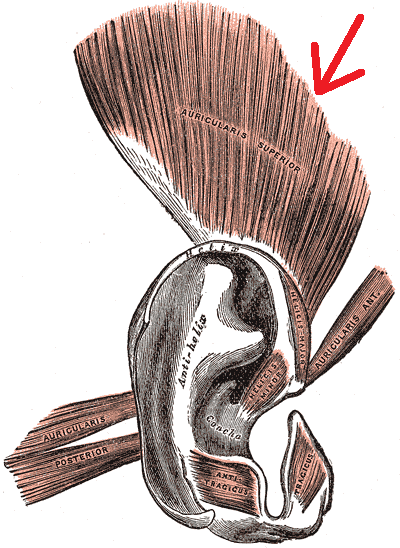
- The muscles of the auricula. Superior auricular is at top (indicated by the red arrow).

Details
- Origin: Temporal fascia
- Insertion: Above the auricle of the outer ear
- Artery: Posterior auricular artery
- Nerve: Branches to auricular muscle from posterior auricular nerve of facial nerve (cranial nerve VII)
- Actions: Pulls ear upward

Identifiers
- Latin: musculus auricularis superior
- TA98: A04.1.03.021
- TA2: 2090
- FMA: 46855

The superior auricular muscle is a muscle above the auricle of the outer ear. It originates from the epicranial aponeurosis, and inserts into the upper part of the medial surface of the auricle. It draws the auricle upwards.

== Structure ==
The superior auricular muscle originates from the epicranial aponeurosis. Its fibres converge to be inserted by a thin, flattened tendon into the upper part of the medial surface of the auricle of the outer ear.

It is the largest of the three auriculares muscles. It is thin and fan-shaped.

=== Nerve supply ===
The superior auricular muscle is supplied by the temporal branch of the facial nerve (VII).

== Function ==
Research on electromyographic signals in humans suggests the superior auricular muscle has a vestigial role linked to attempts to separate different sound sources.

== Additional images ==
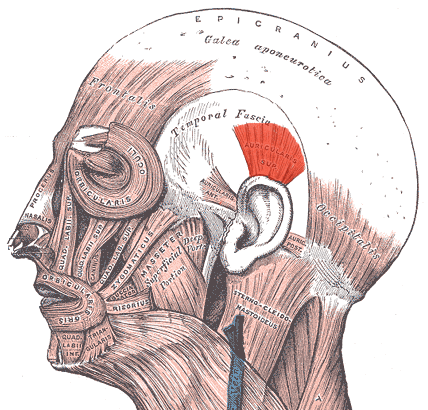
Auricula in context. Superior auricular shown in red.

== See also ==
- Anterior auricular muscle
- Posterior auricular muscle
