= Outer ear =

Outer part of the ear

- A diagram of the anatomy of the human ear: Brown is outer ear. Red is middle ear. Purple is inner ear.

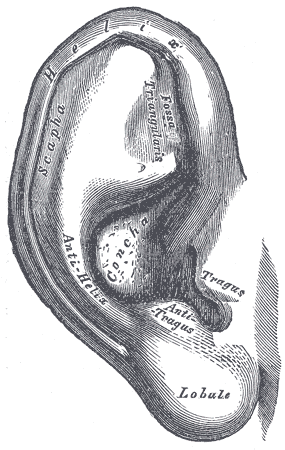
- The auricula. Lateral surface.

Details

Identifiers
- Latin: auris externa
- MeSH: D004431
- NeuroLex ID: birnlex_1705
- TA98: A15.3.01.001
- TA2: 6862
- FMA: 52781

The outer ear, external ear, or auris externa is the external part of the ear, which consists of the auricle (also pinna) and the ear canal. It gathers sound energy and focuses it on the eardrum (tympanic membrane).

== Structure ==
=== Auricle ===
The visible part is called the auricle, also known as the pinna, especially in other animals. It is composed of a thin plate of yellow elastic cartilage, covered with integument, and connected to the surrounding parts by ligaments and muscles; and to the commencement of the ear canal by fibrous tissue. Many mammals can move the pinna (with the auriculares muscles) in order to focus their hearing in a certain direction in much the same way that they can turn their eyes. Most humans do not have this ability.

=== Ear canal ===
From the pinna, the sound waves move into the ear canal (also known as the external acoustic meatus) a simple tube running through to the middle ear. This tube leads inward from the bottom of the auricula and conducts the vibrations to the tympanic cavity and amplifies frequencies in the range 2 kHz to 5 kHz.

=== Auricular muscles ===
==== Intrinsic muscles ====
Intrinsic muscles of external ear
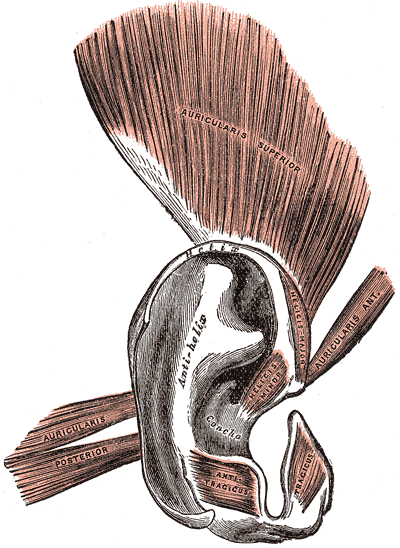
- The muscles of the auricula

Details
- Nerve: Facial nerve
- Actions: Undeveloped in humans

Identifiers
- MeSH: D004431
- NeuroLex ID: birnlex_1705
- TA98: A15.3.01.001
- TA2: 6862
- FMA: 52781

The intrinsic auricular muscles are:

- The helicis major is a narrow vertical band situated upon the anterior margin of the helix. It arises below, from the spina helicis, and is inserted into the anterior border of the helix, just where it is about to curve backward.
- The helicis minor is an oblique fasciculus, covering the crus helicis.
- The tragicus is a short, flattened vertical band on the lateral surface of the tragus. Also known as the mini lobe.
- The antitragicus arises from the outer part of the antitragus, and is inserted into the cauda helicis and antihelix.
- The transverse muscle is placed on the cranial surface of the pinna. It consists of scattered fibers, partly tendinous and partly muscular, extending from the eminentia conchae to the prominence corresponding with the scapha.
- The oblique muscle also on the cranial surface, consists of a few fibers extending from the upper and back part of the concha to the convexity immediately above it.

The intrinsic muscles contribute to the topography of the auricle, while also function as a sphincter of the external auditory meatus. It has been suggested that during prenatal development in the womb, these muscles exert forces on the cartilage which in turn affects the shaping of the ear.

==== Extrinsic muscles ====
Auricular muscles
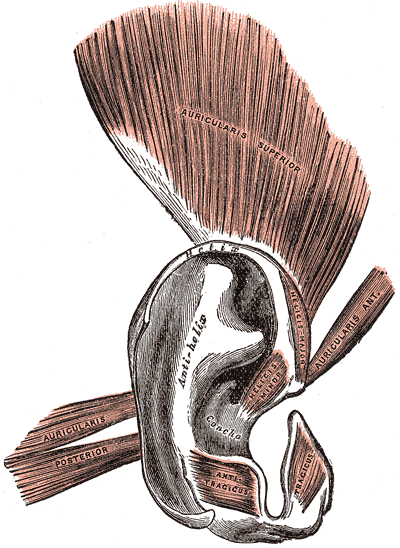
- The muscles of the pinna

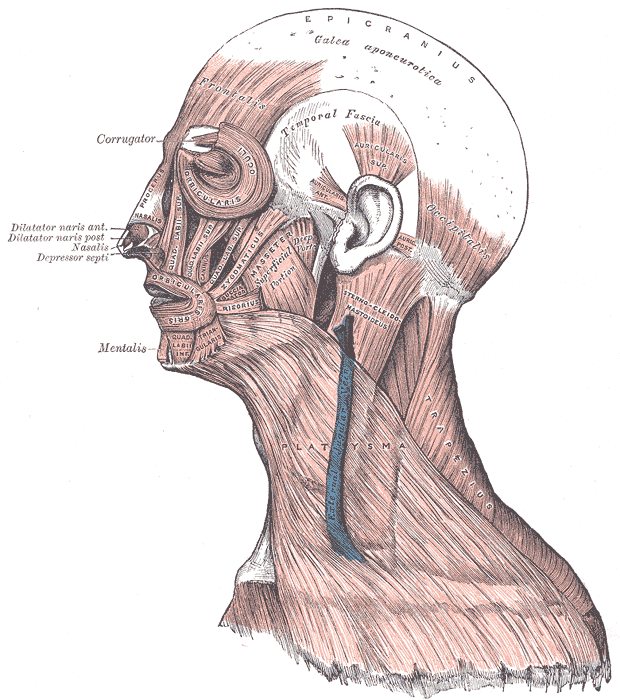
- Auricular muscles in context with the other facial muscles

Details
- Origin: Galeal aponeurosis
- Insertion: Front of the helix, cranial surface of the pinna
- Artery: Posterior auricular artery
- Nerve: Facial nerve
- Actions: Subtle auricle movements (forwards, backwards and upwards)

Identifiers
- Latin: musculi auriculares
- MeSH: D004431
- NeuroLex ID: birnlex_1705
- TA98: A15.3.01.001
- TA2: 6862
- FMA: 52781

The extrinsic auricular muscles are the three muscles surrounding the auricula or outer ear:

- anterior auricular muscle
- superior auricular muscle
- posterior auricular muscle

The superior muscle is the largest of the three, followed by the posterior and the anterior.

In some mammals these muscles can adjust the direction of the pinna. In humans these muscles possess very little action. The auricularis anterior draws the auricula forward and upward, the auricularis superior slightly raises it, and the auricularis posterior draws it backward. The superior auricular muscle also acts as a stabilizer of the occipitofrontalis muscle and as a weak brow lifter. The presence of auriculomotor activity in the posterior auricular muscle causes the muscle to contract and cause the pinna to be pulled backwards and flatten when exposed to sudden, surprising sounds.

== Function ==
One consequence of the configuration of the outer ear is selectively to boost the sound pressure 30- to 100-fold for frequencies around 3 kHz. This amplification makes humans most sensitive to frequencies in this range—and also explains why they are particularly prone to acoustical injury and hearing loss near this frequency. Most human speech sounds are also distributed in the bandwidth around 3 kHz.

An important function of the pinna and concha is to selectively filter different sound frequencies in order to provide cues about the elevation of the sound source. The convolutions of the pinna are shaped so that the outer ear transmits more high-frequency components from an elevated source than from the same source at ear level.

== Clinical significance ==
Malformations of the external ear can be a consequence of hereditary disease, or exposure to environmental factors such as radiation, infection. Such defects include:

- A preauricular fistula, which is a long narrow tube, usually near the tragus. This can be inherited as an autosomal recessive fashion and may suffer from chronic infection in later life.
- Cosmetic defects, such as very large ears, small ears.
- Malformation that may lead to functional impairment, such as atresia of the external auditory meatus or aplasia of the pinna,
- Genetic syndromes, which include:
  - Konigsmark syndrome, characterised by small ears and atresia of the external auditory canal, causing conductive hearing loss and inherited in an autosomal recessive manner.
  - Goldenhar syndrome, a combination of developmental abnormalities affecting the ears, eyes, bones of the skull, and vertebrae, inherited in an autosomal dominant manner.
  - Treacher Collins syndrome, characterised by dysplasia of the auricle, atresia of the bony part of the auditory canal, hypoplasia of the auditory ossicles and tympanic cavity, and 'mixed' deafness (both sensorineural and conductive), inherited in an autosomal dominant manner.
  - Crouzon syndrome, characterised by bilateral atresia of the external auditory canal, inherited in an autosomal dominant manner.

=== Surgery ===
Usually, malformations are treated with surgery, although artificial prostheses are also sometimes used.

- Preauricular fistulas are generally not treated unless chronically inflamed.
- Cosmetic defects without functional impairment are generally repaired after ages 6–7.

If malformations are accompanied by hearing loss amenable to correction, then the early use of hearing aids may prevent complete hearing loss.

== Evolution ==
The outer ear's cartilage is homologous to the cartilage in gills of amphibians, fishes, and invertebrates such as the horseshoe crab. The extracolumella cartilage of reptiles is likely also homologous.

== Additional images ==
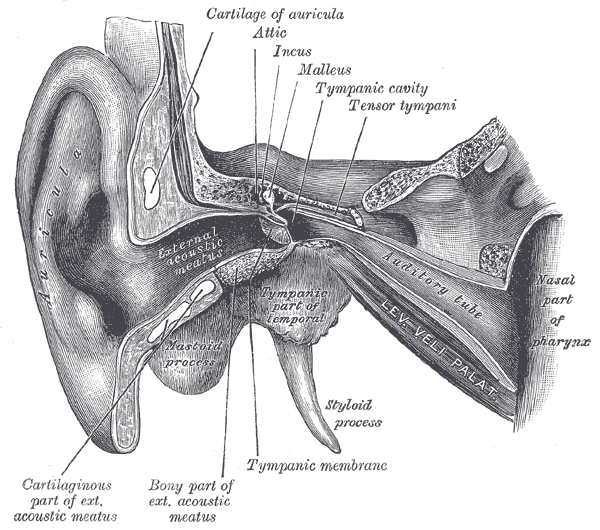
External and middle ear, opened from the front. Right side.

== Sources ==
- Asanov, A. Yu.; Demikova, N. S.; Morozov, S. A. (2003). A. Yu. Asanov (ed.). Основы генетики и наследственные нарушения развития у детей [Fundamentals of Genetics and Hereditary Developmental Disorders in Children] (in Russian). Moscow: Akademiya Publishing Center. ISBN 5-7695-0966-X.
- Bogomilsky, M. R.; Chistyakova, V. R. (2002). Детская оториноларингология [Pediatric Otorhinolaryngology] (in Russian). Moscow: GEOTAR-MED. ISBN 5-9231-0227-7.
- Palchun, V. T.; Kryukov, A. I. (2001). Оториноларингология: Руководство для врачей [Otorhinolaryngology: A Guide for Physicians] (in Russian). Moscow: Meditsina. ISBN 5-225-04612-6.
- Prokhorov, Alexander M., ed. (1986). Soviet encyclopedic dictionary (4th ed.). Moscow: Soviet Encyclopedia.
