= Posterior auricular muscle =

Muscle that pulls the ear upward and backward

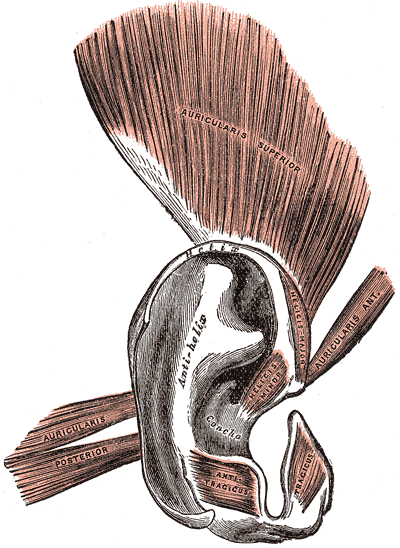
- The muscles of the auricula

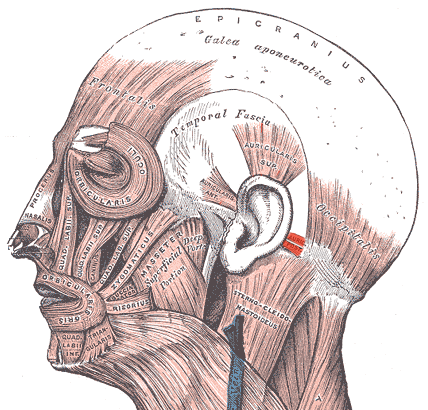
- Auricula in context.

Details
- Origin: Mastoid process of temporal bone
- Insertion: Posterior part of auricle of outer ear
- Artery: Posterior auricular artery
- Vein: Posterior auricular vein
- Nerve: Posterior auricular nerve of facial nerve (VII)
- Actions: Pulls ear backward

Identifiers
- Latin: musculus auricularis posterior
- TA98: A04.1.03.022
- TA2: 2091
- FMA: 46857

The posterior auricular muscle is a muscle behind the auricle of the outer ear. It arises from the mastoid part of the temporal bone, and inserts into the lower part of the cranial surface of the auricle of the outer ear. It draws the auricle backwards, usually a very slight effect.

== Structure ==
The posterior auricular muscle is found behind the auricle of the outer ear. It consists of two or three fleshy fasciculi. These arise from the mastoid part of the temporal bone by short aponeurotic fibers. They insert into the lower part of the cranial surface of the auricle of the outer ear.

The posterior auricular muscle is supplied by branches of the posterior auricular artery, which continues deep to the muscle. It is drained by the posterior auricular vein that accompanies the artery.

=== Nerve supply ===
The posterior auricular muscle is supplied by the posterior auricular nerve, a branch of the facial nerve (VII).

== Function ==
The posterior auricular nerve draws the auricle of the outer ear backwards. This effect is usually very slight, although some people can wiggle their ears due to a more significant muscle movement. Electromyographic signals in humans suggest the posterior auricular muscle may be part of an ancient system for monitoring sounds we can't see.

=== Postauricular reflex ===
The postauricular reflex is a vestigial myogenic muscle response in humans that acts to pull the ear upward and backward. Research suggests neural circuits for auricle orienting have survived in a vestigial state for over 25 million years. It is often assumed the reflex is a vestigial Preyer reflex (also known as the pinna reflex).

A study on auriculomotor activity found that in the presence of sudden, surprising sounds, the muscles around the ear closest to the direction of the sound would respond by moving involuntarily, causing the pinna to be pulled backwards and flatten.

== Clinical significance ==
If the posterior auricular muscle inserts into an unusual part of the auricle of the outer ear, this can cause protruding ears. In one study, the muscle was found to be absent in 5% of people.

== See also ==
- Anterior auricular muscle
- Superior auricular muscle
