= Frontalis muscle =

Muscle covering parts of the skull

Frontalis
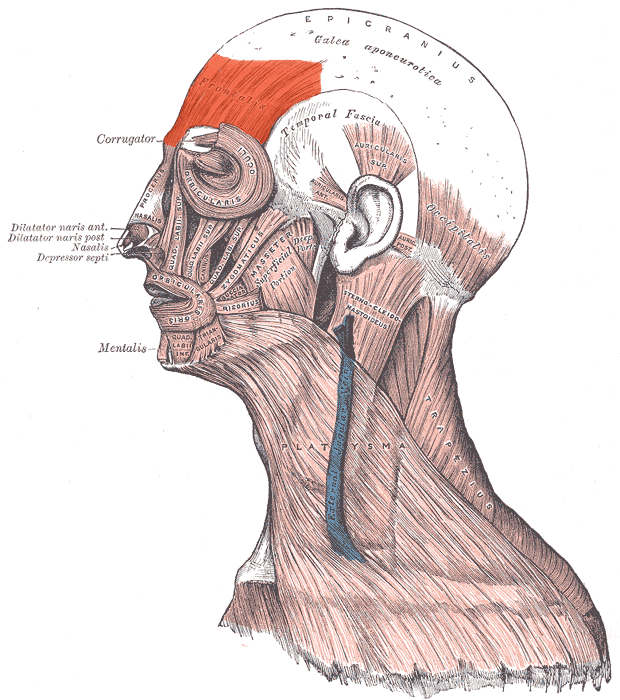
- Visible at top left colored in red

Details
- Origin: Galea aponeurotica (epicranial aponeurotis)
- Insertion: Orbicularis oculi muscle
- Artery: Supraorbital and supratrochlear arteries
- Nerve: Facial nerve Temporal branch
- Actions: Raises eyebrows and wrinkles forehead

Identifiers
- Latin: venter frontalis musculi occipitofrontalis
- TA98: A04.1.03.004
- TA2: 2056
- FMA: 46757

The frontalis muscle (from Latin 'frontal muscle') is a muscle which covers parts of the forehead of the skull. Some sources consider the frontalis muscle to be a distinct muscle. However, Terminologia Anatomica currently classifies it as part of the occipitofrontalis muscle along with the occipitalis muscle.

In humans, the frontalis muscle only serves for facial expressions.

The frontalis muscle is supplied by the facial nerve and receives blood from the supraorbital and supratrochlear arteries.

== Structure ==
The frontalis muscle is thin, of a quadrilateral form, and intimately adherent to the superficial fascia. It is broader than the occipitalis and its fibers are longer and paler in color. It is located on the front of the head.

The muscle has no bony attachments. Its medial fibers are continuous with those of the procerus; its intermediate fibers blend with the corrugator and orbicularis oculi muscles, thus attached to the skin of the eyebrows; and its lateral fibers are also blended with the latter muscle over the zygomatic process of the frontal bone.

From these attachments the fibers are directed upward, and join the galea aponeurotica below the coronal suture.

The medial margins of the frontalis muscles are joined together for some distance above the root of the nose; but between the occipitales there is a considerable, though variable, interval, occupied by the galea aponeurotica.

== Function ==
In humans, the frontalis muscle only serves for facial expressions.

In the eyebrows, its primary function is to lift them (thus opposing the orbital portion of the orbicularis), especially when looking up. It also acts when a view is too distant or dim. The frontalis muscle also serves to wrinkle the forehead.

== Additional images ==
Position of frontalis muscle (shown in red)

== See also ==
- Occipitofrontalis muscle
