= Temporal branches of the facial nerve =

Nerves of the head

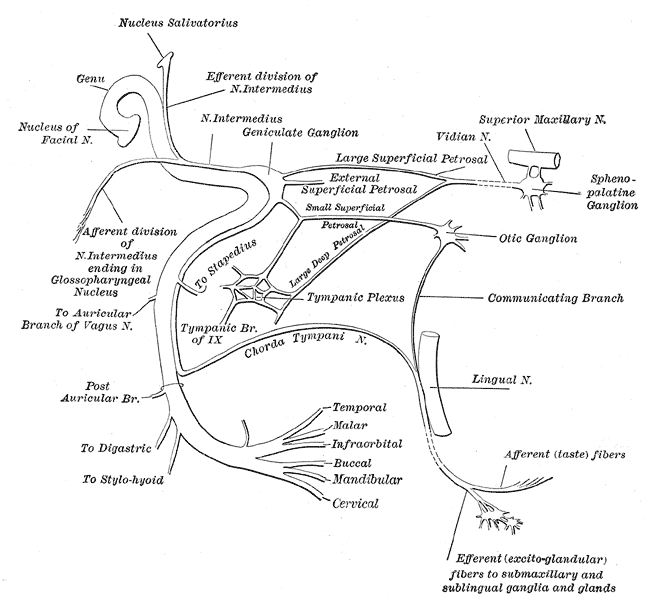
- Plan of the facial and intermediate nerves and their communication with other nerves (labeled at center bottom, sixth from bottom, as "Temporal")

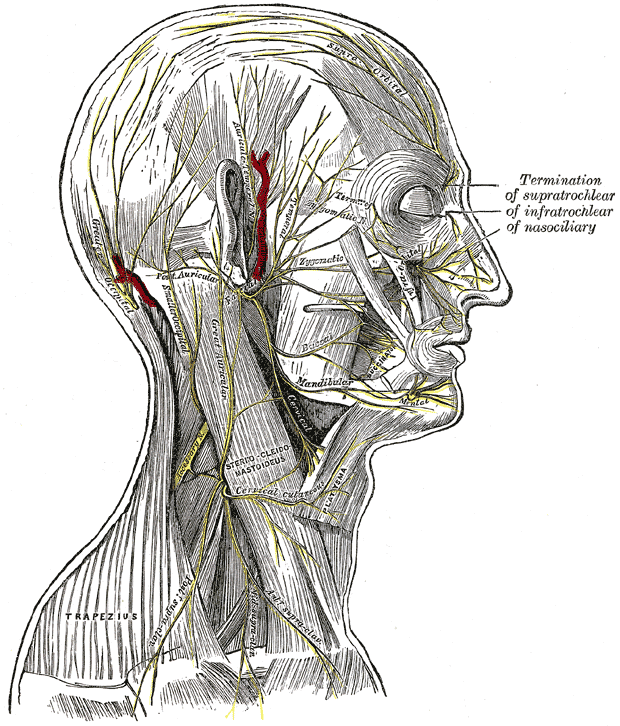
- The nerves of the scalp, face, and side of neck (temporal labeled at center, between eye and ear.)

Details
- From: Facial nerve

Identifiers
- Latin: rami temporales nervi facialis
- TA98: A14.2.01.109
- TA2: 6302
- FMA: 53291

The temporal branches of the facial nerve (frontal branch of the facial nerve) crosses the zygomatic arch to the temporal region, supplying the auriculares anterior and superior, and joining with the zygomaticotemporal branch of the maxillary nerve, and with the auriculotemporal branch of the mandibular nerve.

The more anterior branches supply the frontalis, the orbicularis oculi, and corrugator supercilii, and join the supraorbital and lacrimal branches of the ophthalmic. The temporal branch acts as the efferent limb of the corneal reflex.

== Anatomic location ==
The temporal branch of the facial nerve is typically found between the temporoparietal fascia (i.e., superficial temporal fascia) and temporal fascia (i.e., deep temporal fascia). This layer is also known as the innominate fascia.

There are several methods using anatomic landmarks that may be used to find the temporal branch of the facial nerve. One method is using Pitanguy's line, which is defined as running from 0.5 cm below the tragus to 1.5 cm above the lateral eyebrow. Another method is to recognize that the temporal branch runs between the lines from the earlobe to the hairline and from the earlobe to the lateral eyebrow.

== Testing the temporal branches of the facial nerve ==
To test the function of the temporal branches of the facial nerve, a patient is asked to frown and wrinkle their forehead.

== Additional images ==
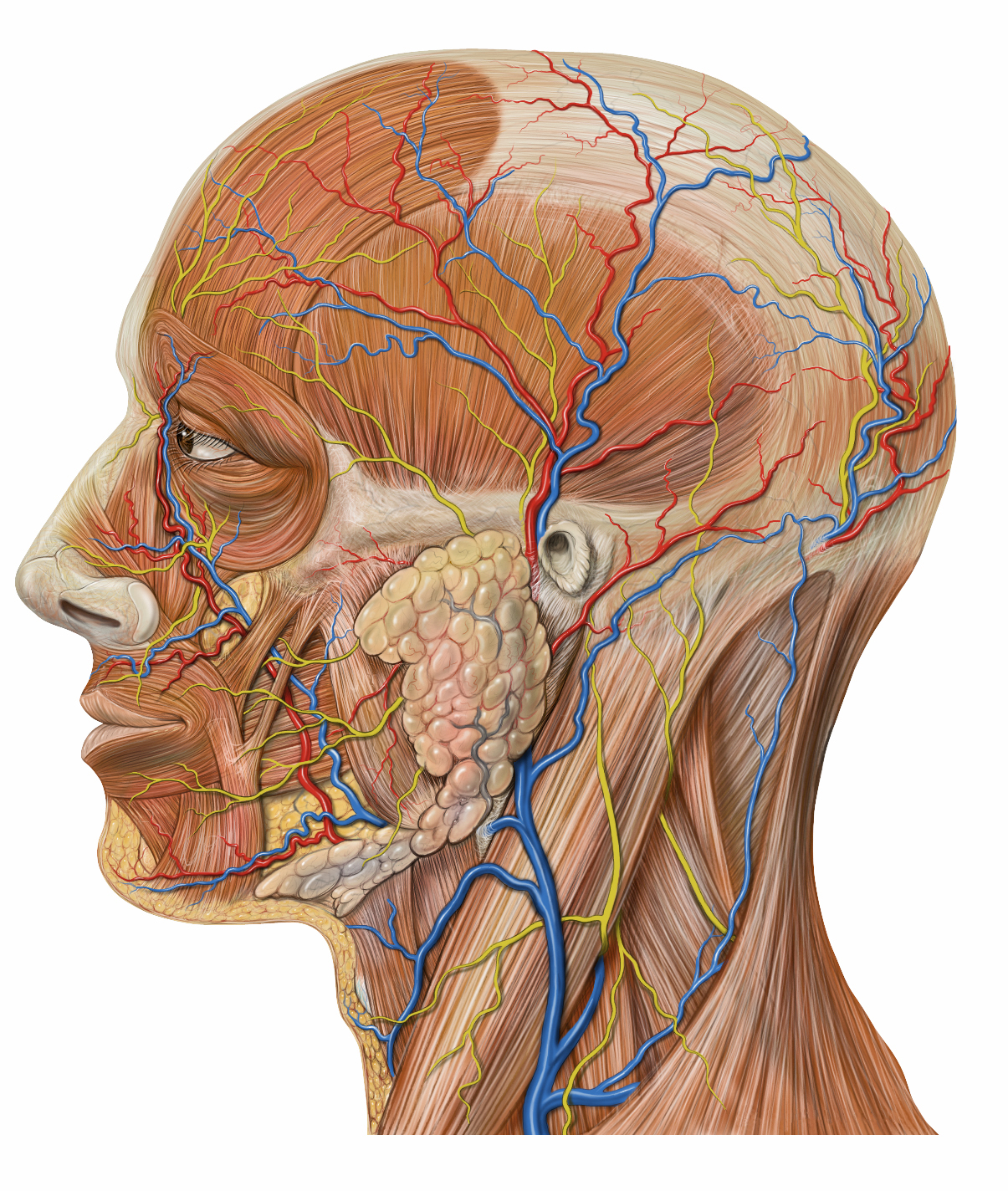
Lateral head anatomy detail

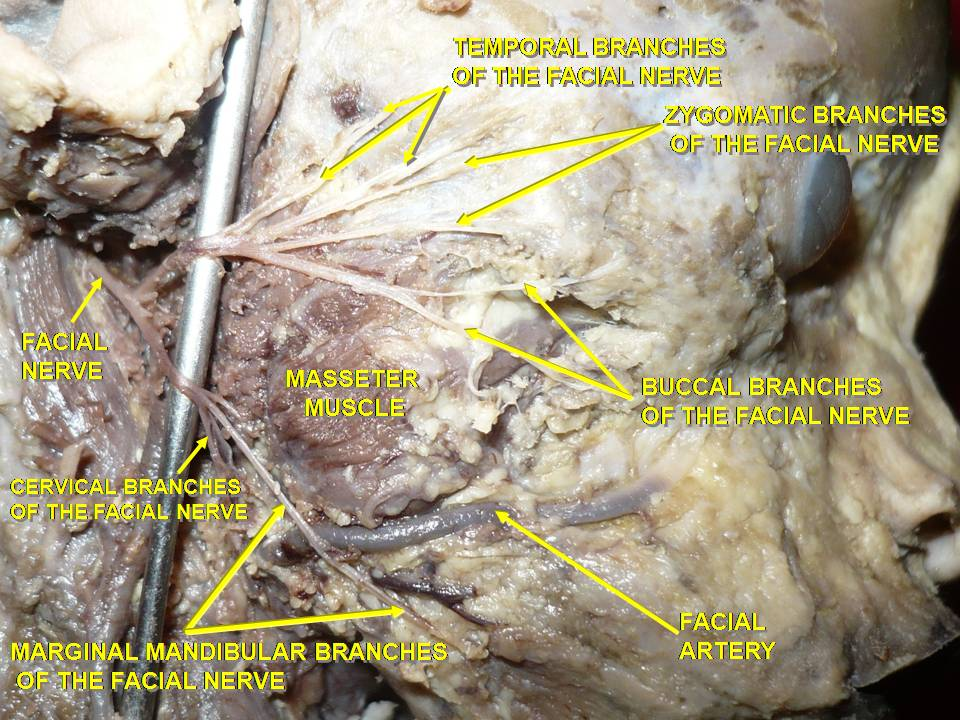
Lateral head anatomy detail.Dissection the newborn

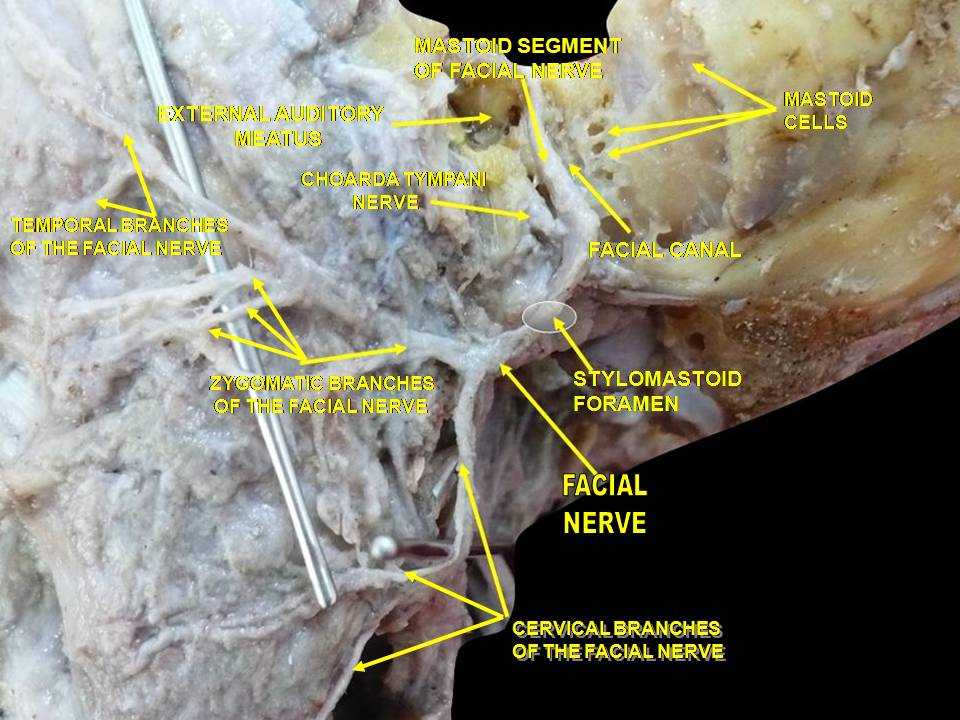
Lateral head anatomy detail.Facial nerve dissection.
