= Temporal fascia =

Connective tissue on the skull

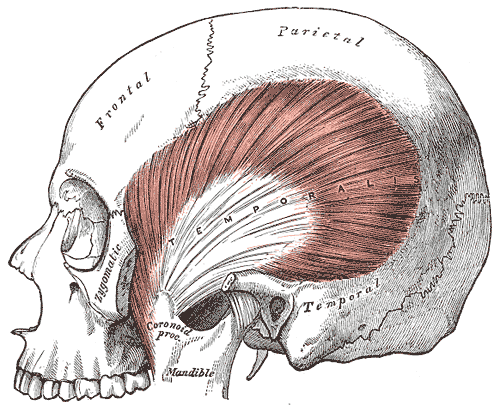
- The temporalis; the zygomatic arch and masseter have been removed.

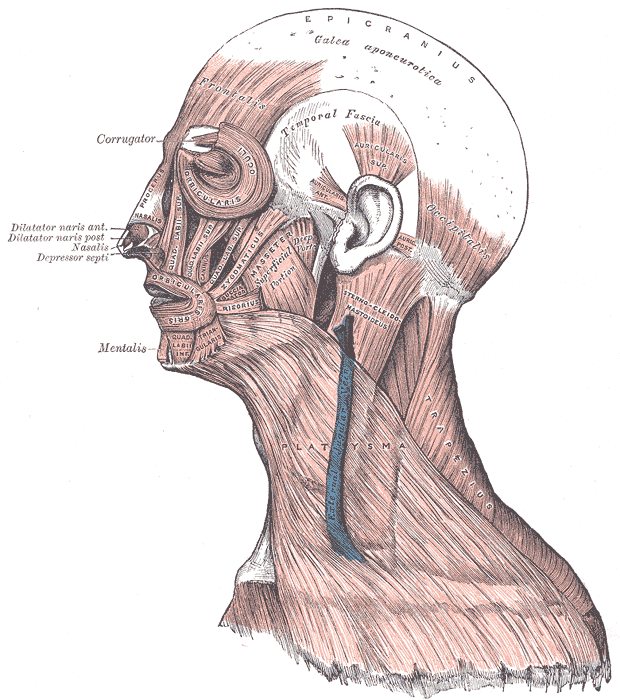
- Muscles of the head, face, and neck. (Temporal fascia labeled at top center.)

Details

Identifiers
- Latin: fascia temporalis
- TA98: A04.1.04.013
- TA2: 2138
- FMA: 76863

The temporal fascia (or deep temporal fascia) is a fascia of the head that covers the temporalis muscle and structures situated superior to the zygomatic arch.

The fascia is attached superiorly at the superior temporal line; inferiorly, it splits into two layers at the superior border of the zygomatic arch. The superficial layer then attaches to the lateral aspect of the superior border of the arch, and the deep layer to its medial aspect.

The space between the two layers is occupied by adipose tissue and contains a branch of the superficial temporal artery, and the zygomaticotemporal nerve.

== Anatomy ==
The temporal fascia is a strong fibrous investment.

=== Structure ===
Superiorly, it is a single layer, attached to the entire extent of the superior temporal line.

Inferiorly, where it is fixed to the zygomatic arch, it consists of two layers, one of which is inserted into the lateral, and the other into the medial border of the arch.

=== Contents ===
A small quantity of fat, the orbital branch of the superficial temporal artery, and a filament from the zygomatic branch of the maxillary nerve, are contained between the two layers created by the inferior split of the fascia.

=== Attachments ===
The superficial fibers of the temporalis muscle attach onto the deep surface of the temporal fascia.

=== Relations ===
Superficial to the temporal fascia are the auricularis anterior muscle and superior auricular muscle, the galea aponeurotica and (part of) the orbicularis oculi muscle.

The superficial temporal vessels and the auriculotemporal nerve cross it inferoposteriorly.

The parotid fascia proceeds to the temporal fascia.
