= Supratrochlear artery =

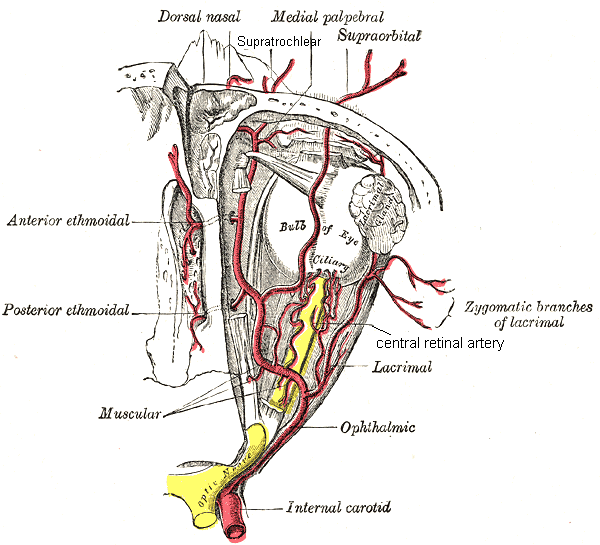
- The ophthalmic artery and its branches (supratrochlear artery labeled at center top)

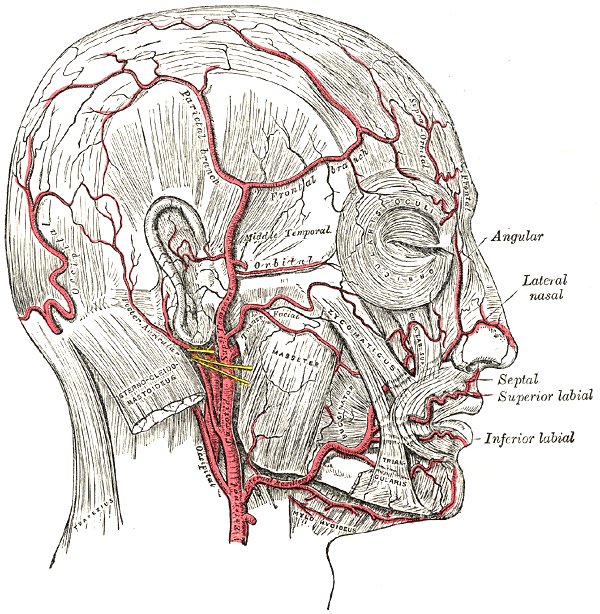
- The arteries of the face and scalp (supratrochlear artery labeled at upper right, above eye)

Details
- Source: Ophthalmic artery
- Supplies: Skin of medial forehead and scalp, underlying pericranium and frontalis muscle

Identifiers
- Latin: arteria supratrochlearis, arteria frontalis
- TA98: A12.2.06.048
- TA2: 4499
- FMA: 50025

The supratrochlear artery (or frontal artery) is one of the terminal branches of the ophthalmic artery. It arises within the orbit. It exits the orbit alongside the supratrochlear nerve. It contributes arterial supply to the skin, muscles and pericranium of the forehead.

== Anatomy ==
It branches from the ophthalmic artery near the trochlea of the superior oblique muscle in the orbit.

=== Origin ===
The supratrochlear artery branches from the ophthalmic artery in the orbit near the trochlea of the superior oblique muscle.

=== Course ===
After branching from the ophthalmic artery, it passes anteriorly through the superomedial orbit. It travels medial to the trochlear nerve. With the supratrochlear nerve, the supratrochlear artery exits the orbit through the supratrochlear notch (variably present), medial to the supraorbital foramen. It then ascends on the forehead.

=== Anastomoses ===
The supratrochlear artery anastomoses with the contralateral supratrochlear artery, and the ipsilateral supraorbital artery.

=== Distribution ===
The supratrochlear artery supplies blood to the skin of the medial aspect of the forehead and scalp, as well as the underlying pericranium and frontalis muscle.
