= Occipitalis muscle =

Muscle of the head

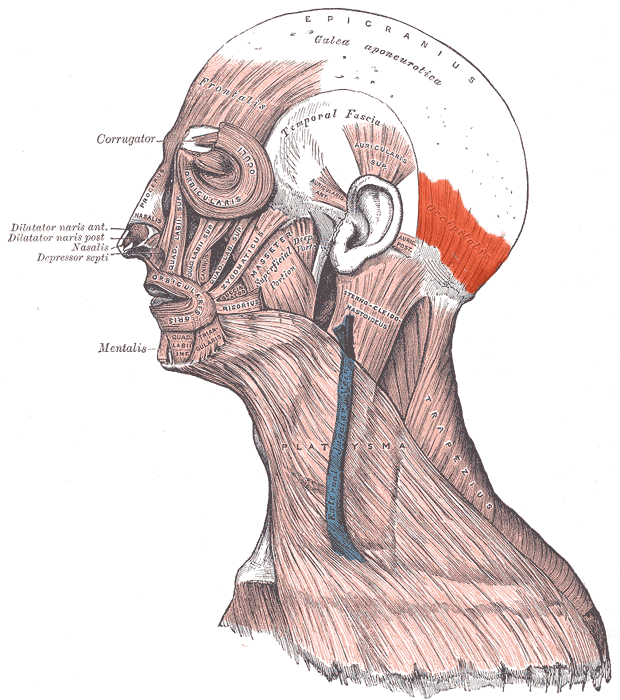
- Muscles of the face and neck (occipitalis muscle visible at center right in red)

Details
- Origin: Superior nuchal line of the occipital bone and mastoid process of the temporal bone
- Insertion: Galea aponeurosis
- Artery: Occipital artery
- Nerve: Posterior auricular nerve (a branch of the facial nerve)
- Actions: Moves the scalp back

Identifiers
- Latin: venter occipitalis musculi occipitofrontalis
- TA98: A04.1.03.005
- TA2: 2057
- FMA: 46758

The occipitalis muscle (occipital belly) is a muscle which covers parts of the skull. Some sources consider the occipital muscle to be a distinct muscle. However, Terminologia Anatomica currently classifies it as part of the occipitofrontalis muscle along with the frontalis muscle.

The occipitalis muscle is thin and quadrilateral in form. It arises from tendinous fibers from the lateral two-thirds of the superior nuchal line of the occipital bone and from the mastoid process of the temporal and ends in the epicranial aponeurosis.

The occipitalis muscle is innervated by the posterior auricular nerve (a branch of the facial nerve) and its function is to move the scalp back. The muscles receives blood from the occipital artery.

== Additional image ==
Position of occipitalis muscle (shown in red).

== See also ==
- Occipitofrontalis muscle
