= Epicranial aponeurosis =

Dense fibrous tissue covering the skull

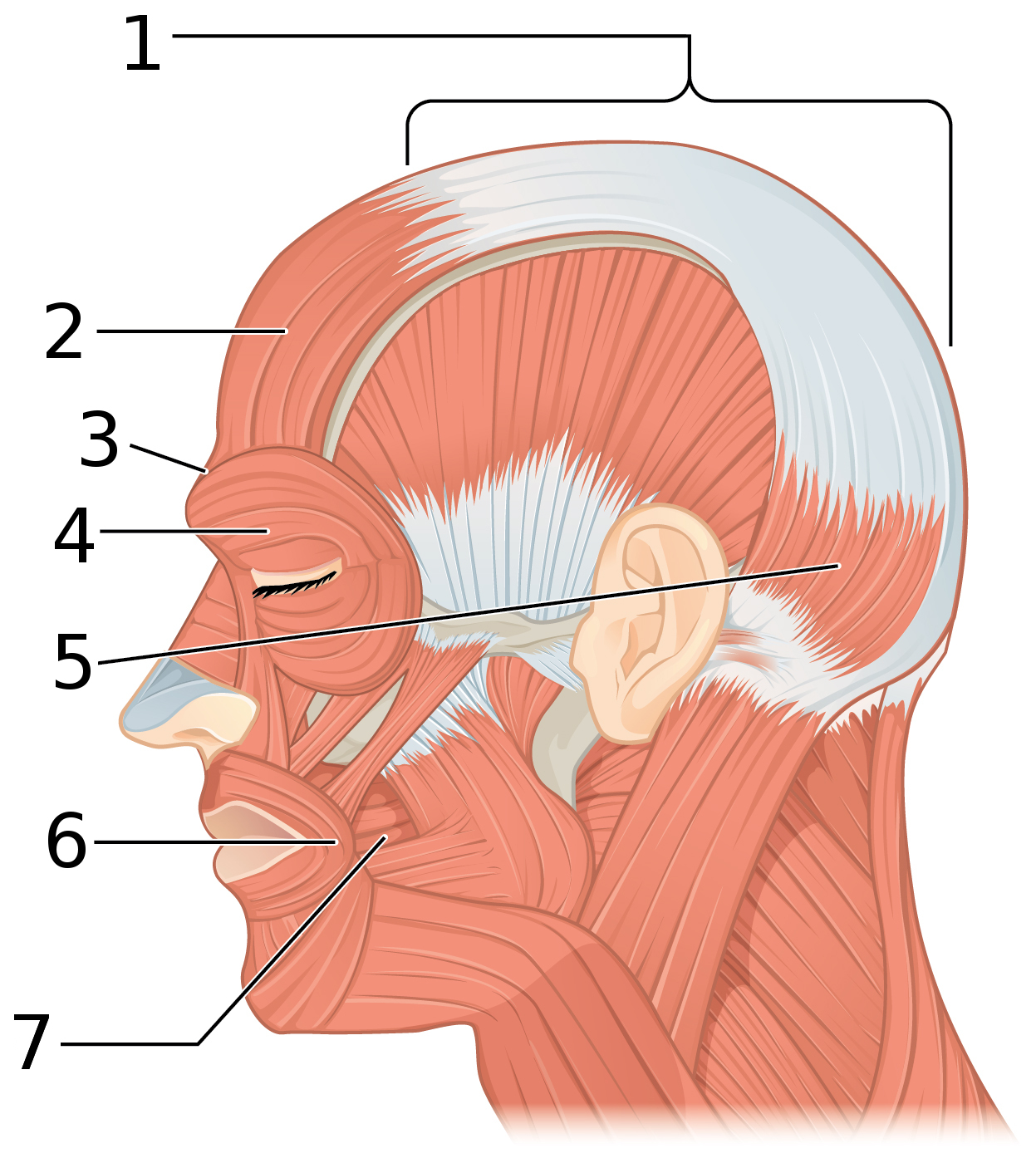
- Muscles of the head, face, and neck. (Epicranial aponeurosis visible at top labeled 1.)

Details
- System: Skeletal

Identifiers
- Latin: galea aponeurotica, aponeurosis epicranialis, aponeurosis epicrania
- TA98: A04.1.03.007
- TA2: 2059
- FMA: 46768

The epicranial aponeurosis (aponeurosis epicranialis, galea aponeurotica) is an aponeurosis (a tough layer of dense fibrous tissue). It covers the upper part of the skull in humans and many other animals.

== Structure ==
In humans, the epicranial aponeurosis originates from the external occipital protuberance and highest nuchal lines of the occipital bone. It merges with the occipitofrontalis muscle. In front, it forms a short and narrow prolongation between its union with the frontalis muscle (the frontal part of the occipitofrontalis muscle).

On either side, the epicranial aponeurosis attaches to the anterior auricular muscles and the superior auricular muscles. Here it is less aponeurotic, and is continued over the temporal fascia to the zygomatic arch as a layer of laminated areolar tissue.

It is closely connected to the integument by the firm, dense, fibro-fatty layer which forms the superficial fascia of the scalp. It is attached to the pericranium by loose cellular tissue, which allows the aponeurosis, carrying with it the integument, to move through a considerable distance.

== Clinical significance ==
Subgaleal haemorrhage is defined as bleeding between the epicranial aponeurosis and the skull. Conservative management is usually appropriate for these, as there is little risk of further damage to surrounding structures.

== History ==
The epicranial aponeurosis is also known as the aponeurosis epicranialis (from Latin), and the galea aponeurotica.

== Additional images ==
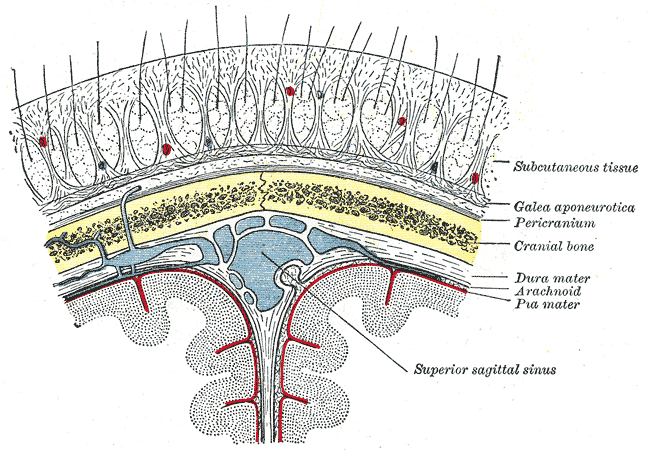
Diagrammatic section of scalp.

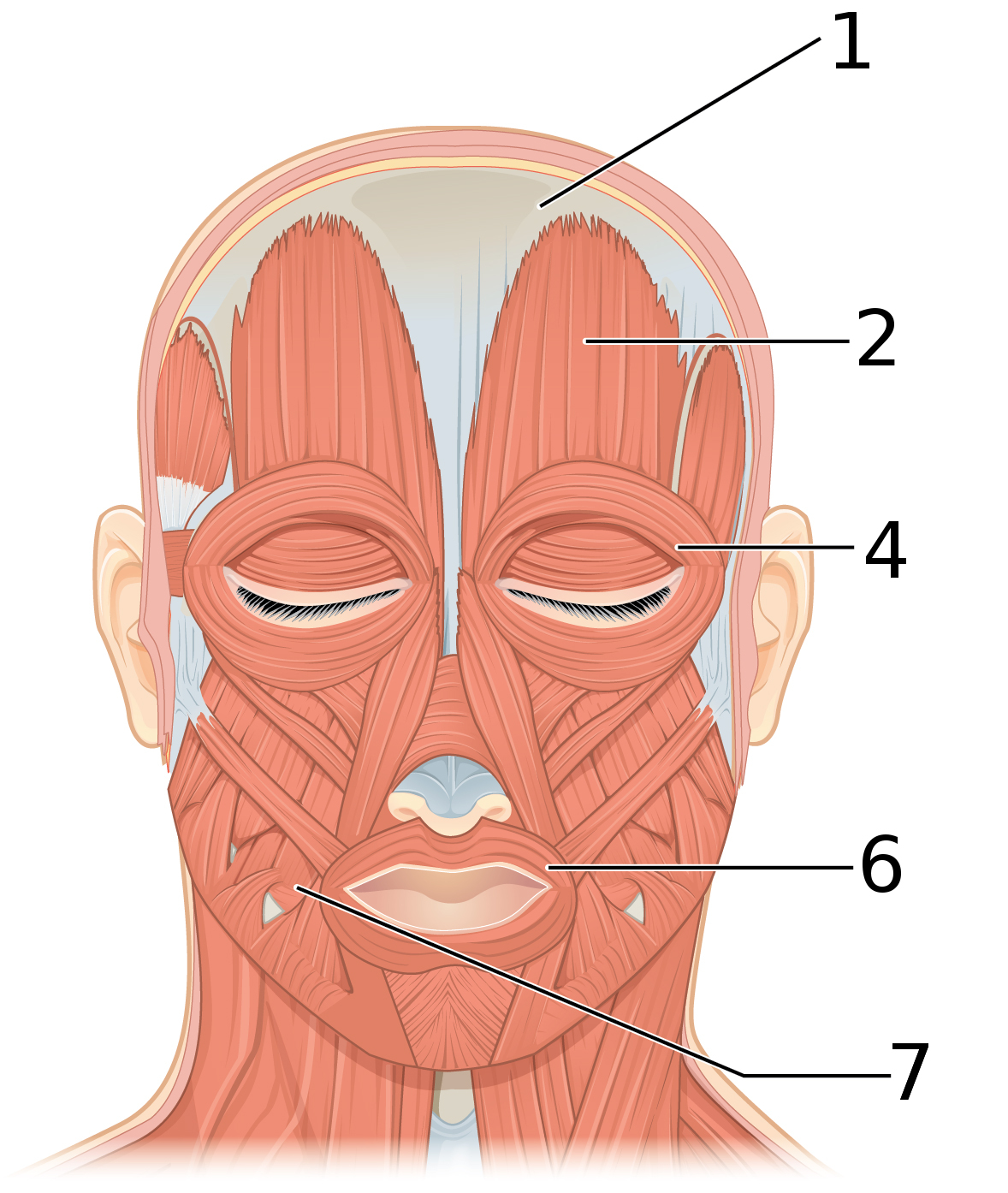
Epicranial aponeurosis from a frontal view, labeled 1

== See also ==
- Epicranium
- Aponeurosis
