= Supraorbital artery =

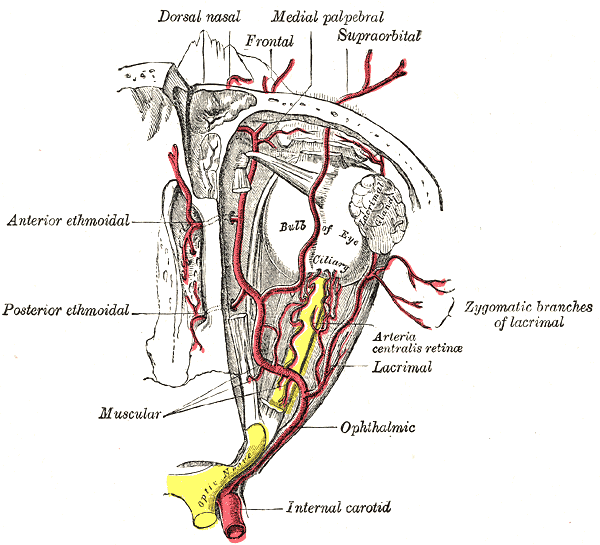
- The ophthalmic artery and its branches. (Supraorbital artery labeled at center top.)

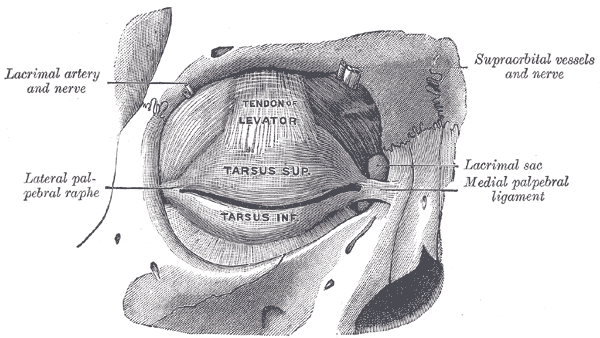
- The tarsi and their ligaments. Right eye; front view. (Supraorbital vessels labeled at upper right.)

Details
- Source: Ophthalmic artery
- Branches: Superficial branch deep branch
- Vein: Supraorbital vein
- Supplies: Levator palpebrae superioris diploë of the frontal bone frontal sinus upper eyelid skin of the forehead scalp

Identifiers
- Latin: arteria supraorbitalis
- TA98: A12.2.06.037
- TA2: 4486
- FMA: 49973

The supraorbital artery is a branch of the ophthalmic artery. It passes anteriorly within the orbit to exit the orbit through the supraorbital foramen or notch alongside the supraorbital nerve, splitting into two terminal branches which go on to form anastomoses with arteries of the head.

== Structure ==
=== Origin ===
The supraorbital artery arises from the ophthalmic artery.

=== Course and relations ===
It travels anteriorly in the orbit by passing superior to the eye and medial to the superior rectus and levator palpebrae superioris. It then joins the supraorbital nerve to jointly pass between the periosteum of the roof of the orbit and the levator palpebrae superioris towards the supraorbital foramen or notch. After passing through the supraorbital foramen or notch, it often splits into a superficial branch and a deep branch.

=== Distribution ===
The supraorbital artery contributes arterial supply to: the superior rectus muscle, superior oblique muscle, levator palpebrae muscles, periorbita, the diploë of the frontal bone, frontal sinus, upper eyelid, and the skin and musculature of the forehead and scalp.

=== Anastomoses ===
Its terminal branches anastomose with the supratrochlear artery, frontal branch of superficial temporal artery, and the contralateral supraorbital artery.

=== Variation ===
This artery may be absent in 10% to 20% of individuals.

== Additional images ==
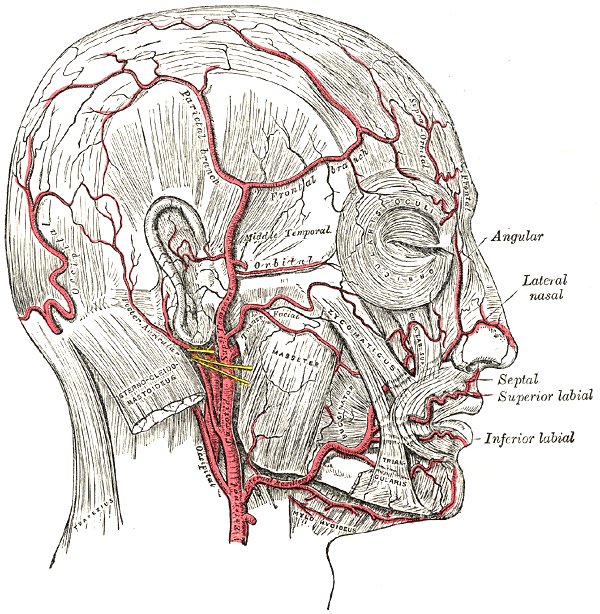
The arteries of the face and scalp.

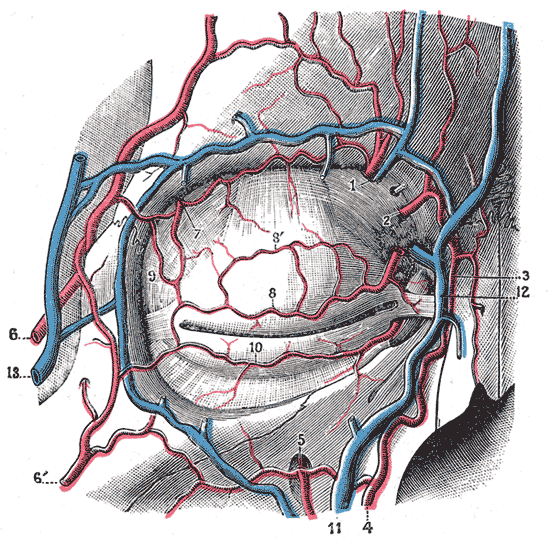
Bloodvessels of the eyelids, front view.

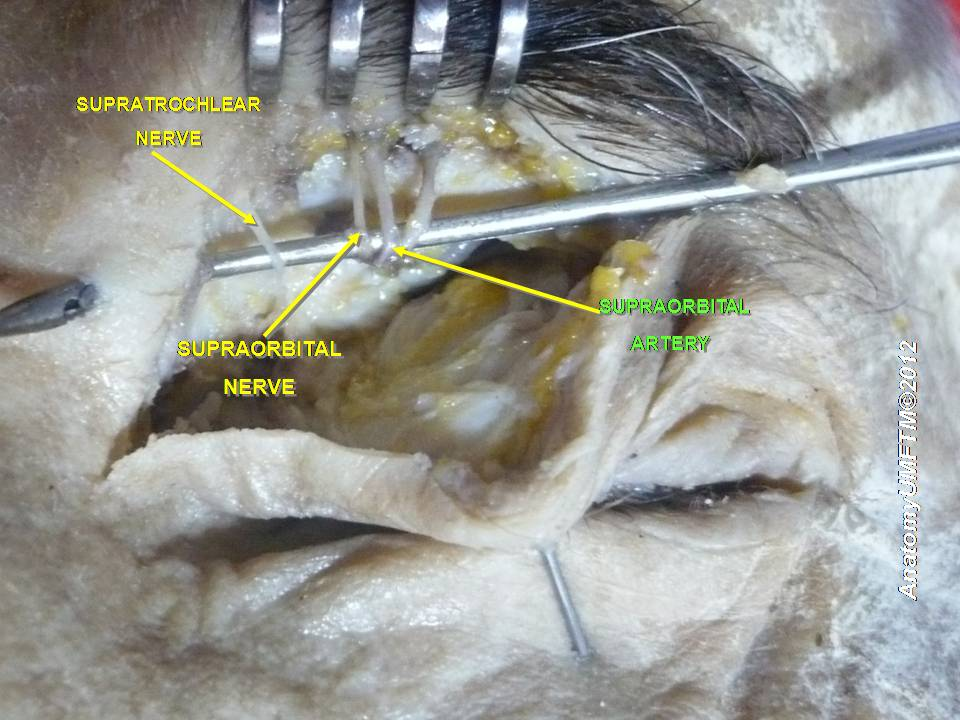
supraorbital artery
