= Cosmetics in the 1920s =

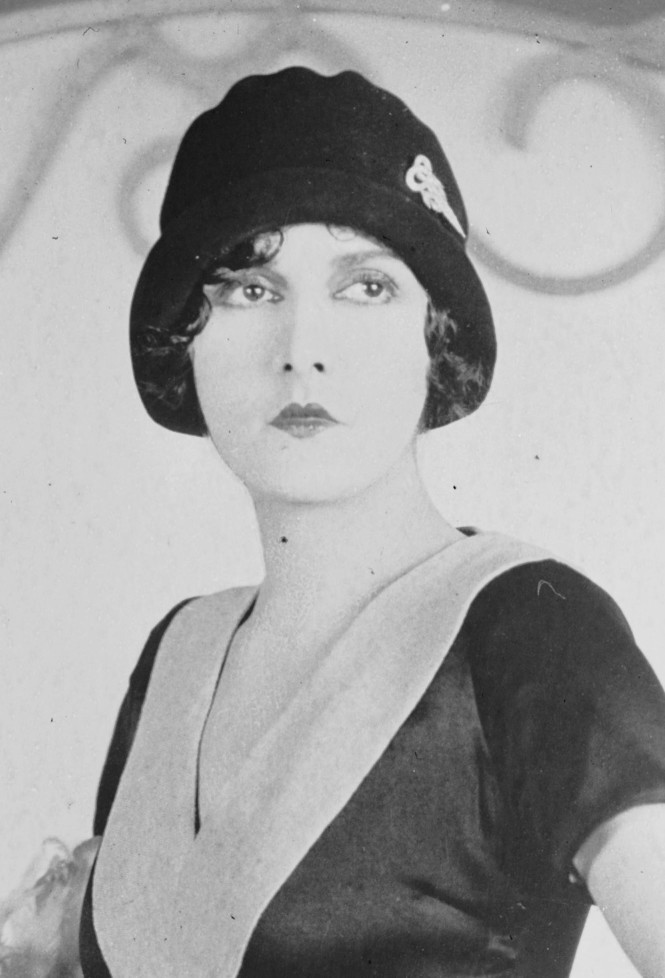
Actress Evelyn Brent's exaggerated lipline is characteristic of cosmetics in the 1920s.

Cosmetics in the 1920s were characterized by their use to create a specific look: lips painted in the shape of a Cupid's bow, kohl-rimmed eyes, and bright cheeks brushed with bright red blush.

== Context ==
The heavily made-up look of the 1920s was a reaction to the demure, feminine Gibson Girl of the pre-war period. In the 1920s, an international beauty culture was forged, and society increasingly focused on novelty and change. Fashion trends influenced theater, film, literature, and art.

The introduction of makeup was reasonably new to the society. Women were figuring out methods to apply it correctly, which later defined makeup looks.

Women also found a new need to wear more make-up, as a skewed postwar sex ratio created a new emphasis on sexual beauty. Additionally, as women began to enter the professional world, publications such as the French Beauty Industry encouraged women to wear makeup to look their best while competing with men for employment.

== Products ==
=== Lipstick ===
Lipstick became widely popular after Maurice Levy's 1915 invention of the metal lipstick container. It was available in salve, liquid, and stick forms, and long-lasting, indelible stains were the most popular. Women chose their lipstick based on their skin complexion for a more natural look. Lip pomade, also called lip gloss, was later invented by Max Factor, Sr. in an effort to provide a glamorous appearance to actress' lips on film. Soon after, 'natural' lip gloss was created, which used bromo acid to create a red effect as it reacted with the wearer's skin. Finally, flavored lipstick was also popular, with the most popular variety being cherry.

In 1916, Max Factor began selling eye shadow and eyebrow pencils. This was the first time such products were available outside of the movie industry. Max continued to be a driving force behind make-up until his death in 1938. In 1991, his company became a part of the Procter & Gamble family.

In the 1920s, different products were also developed that showed the decade's preoccupation with shaping the mouth. Metal lip tracers, made in various sizes to satisfy the wishes of the wearer, were developed to ensure flawless lipstick application. Helena Rubinstein created a product called "Cupid's Bow," that billed itself as a "self-shaping lipstick that forms a perfect cupid's bow as you apply it." The development of the mirrored lipstick container in the 1920s also points to the importance of shaping the lips through the application of lipstick.

=== Rouge ===
During the 1920s, the messy elixir blushes of past years were replaced by creams, powders, liquids, and rouge papers. Powder blushes became more popular after the invention of spill-proof containers and the compact. Blush was applied in circular motions on the cheek and occasionally on the knees depending on the type of woman you identify within society.

Indelible blushes, like indelible lipsticks, were popular.

=== Mascara ===
In the early 1920s many women fulfilled their desire for darker fuller lashes by resorting to the use of common household products. Petroleum jelly (Vaseline) was mixed with soot or coal. The resulting solution was a dark gel that was then applied to the lashes with a fine brush.

During the middle of the decade, mascara was available in cake, tube, wax, and liquid form and applied with a brush. Surprisingly enough, there were even waterproof formulations available.

The various forms of brush-on mascara served to darken the lashes but did not provide the sculpting abilities of modern-day mascara wands. For this, ladies used eyelash curlers such as the then popular Kurlash.

=== Eyebrows ===
Eyebrows in the 1920s were very thin, resembling a straight line pointing downward toward the outside corner of the eye. Natural colors like black and brown colored eyebrows were in style. Actress Clara Bow was famous for her dramatic Cupid's bow eyebrows.
