= Labial vein =

Labial vein may refer to:

- Inferior labial vein
- Posterior labial veins
- Superior labial vein
