= Erythroplakia =

- Other names: Erythroplasia
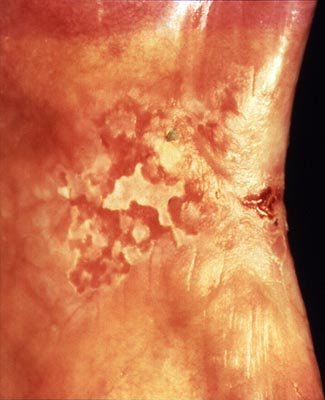
- Erythroleukoplakia ("speckled leukoplakia"), left commissure. Biopsy showed mild epithelial dysplasia and candida infection. Antifungal medication may turn this type of lesion into a homogenous leukoplakia (i.e. the red areas would disappear)
- Specialty: Oral medicine

Erythroplakia is a clinical term to describe any erythematous (red) area on a mucous membrane, that cannot be attributed to any other pathology.

The term erythroplasia was coined by Louis Queyrat to describe a precancerous red lesion of the penis. This gave rise to the term erythroplasia of Queyrat. Depending upon the context, this term may refer specifically to carcinoma in situ of the glans penis or vulva appearing as a red patch, or may be used as a synonym of erythroplasia on other mucous membrane or transitional sites.

It mainly affects the glans penis (the head of the penis), although uncommonly it may present on the mucous membranes of the larynx, and rarely, the mouth, or the anus.

Erythroplakia is analogous to the term leukoplakia which describes white patches. Together, these are the 2 traditionally accepted types of premalignant lesion in the mouth, When a lesion contains both red and white areas, the term "speckled leukoplakia" or "eyrthroleukoplakia" is used.

Although oral erythroplakia is much less common than leukoplakia, erythroplakia carries a significantly higher risk of containing dysplasia or carcinoma in situ, and of eventually transforming into invasive squamous cell carcinoma (a type of oral cancer).

== Signs and symptoms ==
Although often the terms erythroplasia and erythroplakia are used synonymously, some sources distinguish them, stating that the latter is macular (flat) while the former is papular (bumpy).

Erythroplakia of the genital mucosae is often referred to as erythroplasia of Queyrat.

The most common areas in the mouth where erythroplakia is found are the floor of the mouth, buccal vestibule, the tongue, and the soft palate. It appears as a red macule or plaque with well-demarcated borders. The texture is characterized as soft and velvety. An adjacent area of leukoplakia may be found along with the erythroplakia.

Erythroplasia may also occur on the laryngeal mucosa, or the anal mucosa.

== Causes ==
Erythroplakia has an unknown cause but researchers presume it to be similar to the causes of squamous cell carcinoma. Carcinoma is found in almost 40% of erythroplakia. It is mostly found in elderly men around the ages of 65 - 74. It is commonly associated with smoking.

Alcohol and tobacco use have been described as risk factors.

== Diagnosis ==
=== Differential diagnosis of an oral red lesion ===
There are many other conditions that are similar in appearance and must be ruled out before a diagnosis of erythroplakia is made (see table). Sometimes, a diagnosis is delayed for up to two weeks in order to see if the lesion spontaneously regresses on its own or if another cause can be found. Erythroplakia frequently is associated with dysplasia, and is thus a precancerous lesion.

=== Biopsy ===
Microscopically, the tissue exhibits severe epithelial dysplasia, carcinoma-in-situ, or invasive squamous cell carcinoma in 90% of cases. There is an absence of keratin production and a reduced number of epithelial cells. Since the underlying vascular structures are less hidden by tissue, erythroplakia appears red when viewed in a clinical setting.

== Treatment ==
Treatment involves biopsy of the lesion to identify extent of dysplasia. Complete excision of the lesion is sometimes advised depending on the histopathology found in the biopsy. Even in these cases, recurrence of the erythroplakia is common and, thus, long-term monitoring is needed.

== History ==
In 1911, French dermatologist Louis Queyrat described a sharply defined, bright red, glistening velvety precancerous lesion of the glans penis. He coined the term "erythroplasie" to designate red plaques as an analogy to "leucoplasie", which designated white patches. Since "leucoplasie" was the equivalent of the English leukoplakia (coined in 1861), the term became erythroplakia in English. Similarly, the term leukoplakia was originally coined to describe white lesions of the urinary tract, and in 1877 was first applied to white patches in the mouth. It is unclear when the term erythroplakia was first adapted to describe red lesions in the mouth.

== Etymology ==
The word erythroplakia means "red patch", and is derived from the Greek words ερυθρος - "red" and πλάξ - "plate" The World Health Organization defines oral erythroplakia as follows:

Any lesion of the oral mucosa that presents as bright red velvety plaques which cannot be characterized clinically or pathologically as any other recognizable condition
