= Oral cancer =

Cancer of the lining of the lips, mouth, or upper throat

- Other names: Cancer of the lip, oral cavity and pharynx, mouth cancer, tongue cancer, cancer of the lips, oral cavity and pharynx
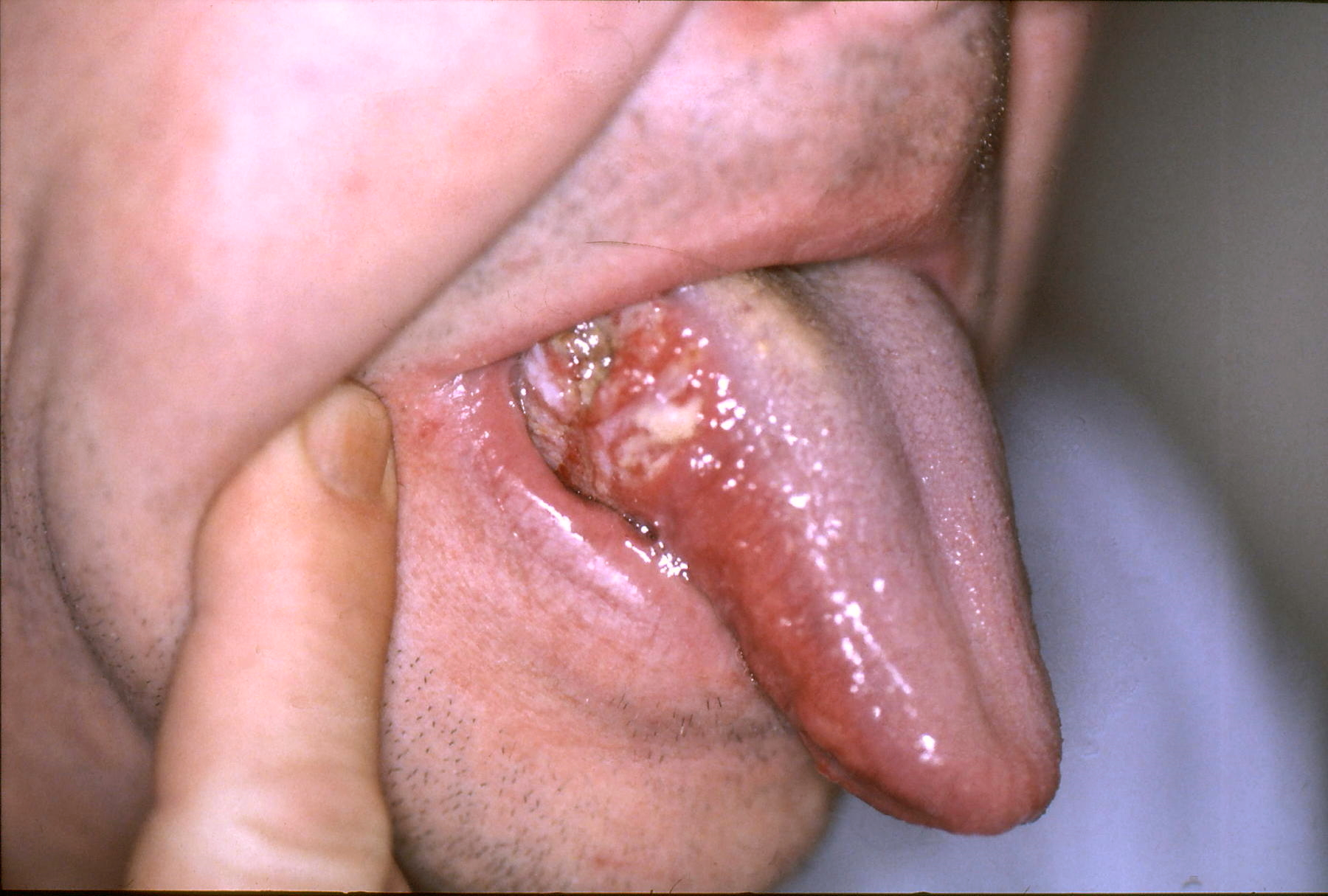
- Oral cancer on the side of the tongue, a common site along with the floor of the mouth
- Specialty: Oncology, oral and maxillofacial surgery, ENT surgery
- Symptoms: Persistent rough white or red patch in the mouth lasting longer than 2 weeks, ulceration, lumps/bumps in the neck, pain, loose teeth, difficulty swallowing
- Risk factors: Smoking, alcohol, HPV infection, sun exposure, chewing tobacco, betel nut chewing
- Diagnostic method: Tissue biopsy
- Differential diagnosis: Non-squamous cell carcinoma oral cancer, salivary gland tumors, benign mucosal disease
- Prevention: Avoiding risk factors, HPV vaccination
- Treatment: Surgery, radiation, chemotherapy
- Prognosis: Five-year survival ~ 70% (US 2026)
- Frequency: 355,000 new cases (2018)
- Deaths: 177,000 (2018)

Oral cancer, also known as oral cavity cancer, tongue cancer or mouth cancer, is a cancer of the lining of the lips, mouth, or upper throat. In the mouth, it most commonly starts as a painless red or white patch, that thickens, gets ulcerated and continues to grow. When on the lips, it commonly looks like a persistent crusting ulcer that does not heal, and slowly grows. Other symptoms may include difficult or painful swallowing, new lumps or bumps in the neck, a swelling in the mouth, or a feeling of numbness in the mouth or lips.

Risk factors include tobacco and alcohol use. Those who use both alcohol and tobacco have a 15 times greater risk of oral cancer than those who use neither. Other risk factors include betel nut chewing and sun exposure on the lip. HPV infection may play a limited role in some oral cavity cancers. Oral cancer is a subgroup of head and neck cancers. Diagnosis is made by sampling (biopsy) of the lesion, followed by an imaging workup (called staging) which can include CT scan, MRI, PET scan to determine the local extension of the tumor, and if the disease has spread to distant parts of the body.

Oral cancer can be prevented by avoiding tobacco products, limiting alcohol use, sun protection on the lip, HPV vaccination, and avoidance of betel nut chewing. Treatments used for oral cancer can include a combination of surgery (to remove the tumor and regional lymph nodes), radiation therapy, chemotherapy, or targeted therapy. The types of treatments will depend on the size, locations, and spread of the cancer taken into consideration with the general health of the person.

In 2018, oral cancer occurred globally in about 355,000 people, and resulted in 177,000 deaths. Between 1999 and 2015 in the United States, the rate of oral cancer increased 6% (from 10.9 to 11.6 per 100,000). Deaths from oral cancer during this time decreased 7% (from 2.7 to 2.5 per 100,000). Oral cancer has an overall 5 year survival rate of 70% in the United States as of 2026. This varies from 88% if diagnosed when localized, compared to 69% if it has spread to the lymph nodes in the neck, and 37% if it has spread to distant parts of the body. Survival rates also are dependent on the location of the disease in the mouth.

== Signs and symptoms ==
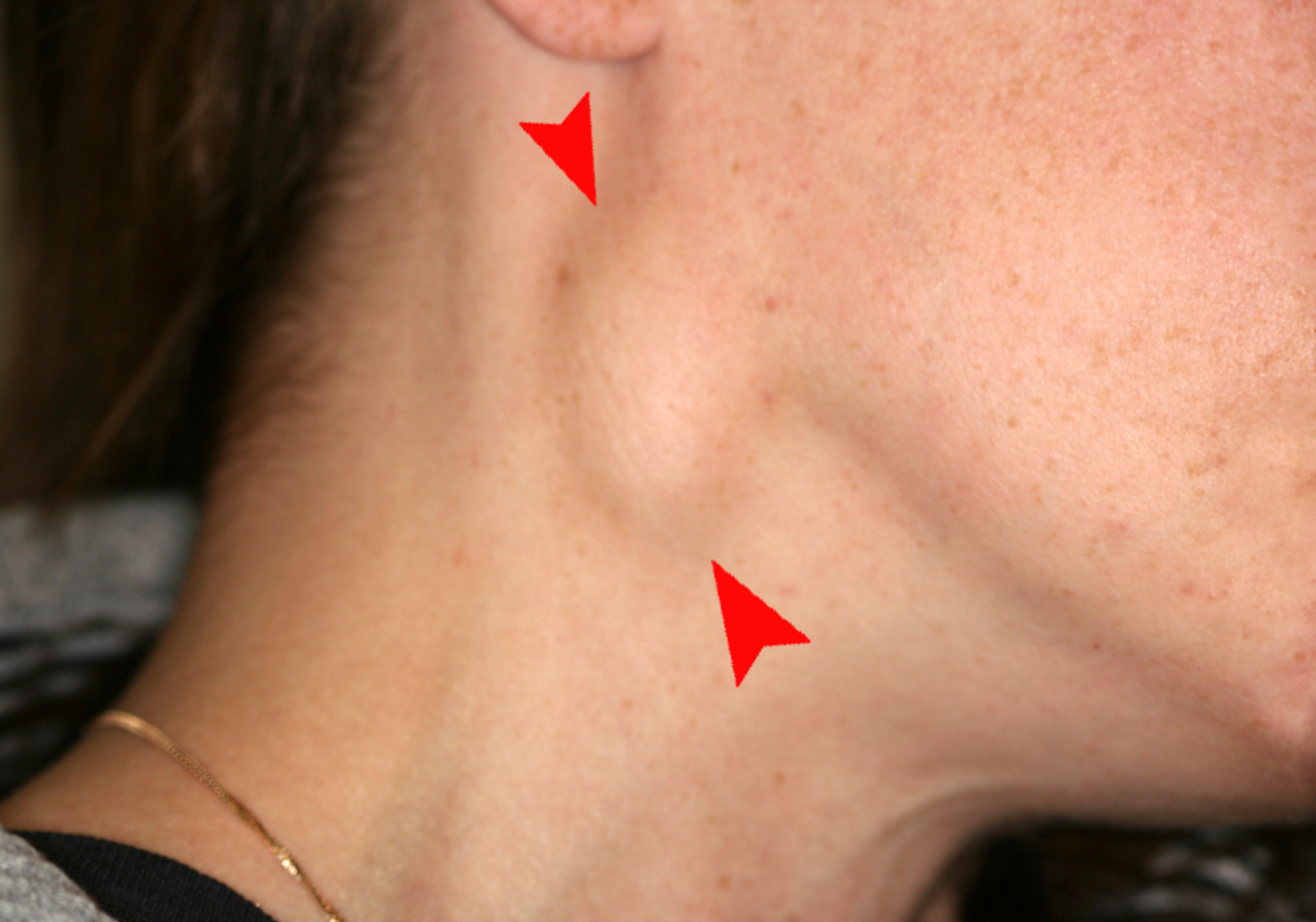
Swelling of the right neck from the spread of oral cancer

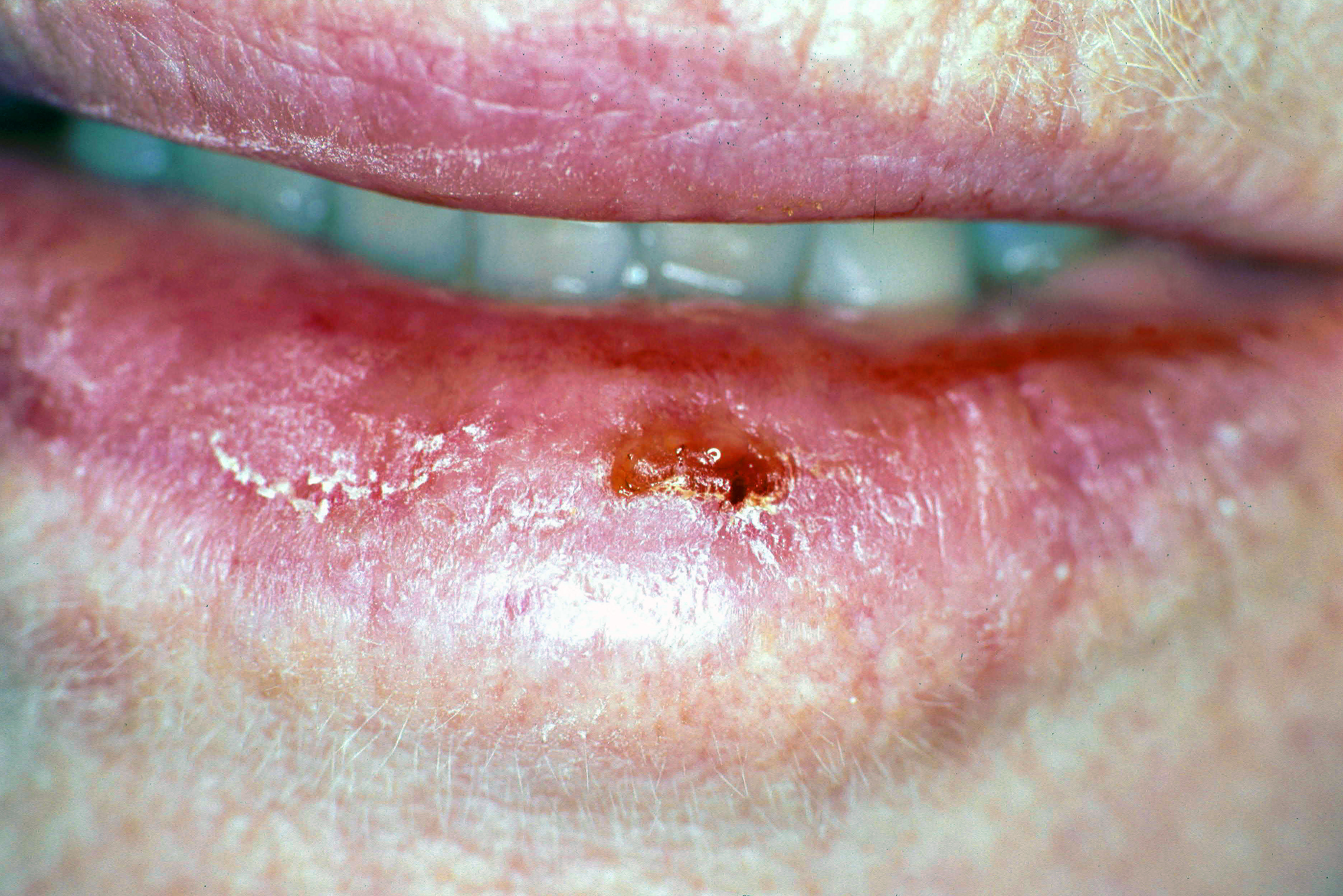
Ulceration on the left lower lip caused by cancer

The signs and symptoms of oral cancer depend on the location of the tumor but are generally thin, irregular, red and/or white patches in the mouth. The classic warning sign is a persistent rough patch with ulceration, and a raised border that is minimally painful. On the lip, the ulcer is more commonly crusting and dry, and in the pharynx it is more commonly a mass. It can also be associated with loose teeth, bleeding gums, persistent ear ache, a feeling of numbness in the lip and chin, or swelling. When the cancer extends to the oropharynx (back of the throat), there can also be difficulty swallowing.

== Causes ==
The main causes of oral cancer are alcohol and tobacco (smoked or chewed). The risk is especially high when a person regularly uses both. The more is consumed of either the higher the risk of developing oral cancer. Like all environmental factors, the rate at which cancer will develop is dependent on the dose, frequency and method of application of the carcinogen (the substance that is causing the cancer). Aside from tobacco and alcohol, other carcinogens for oral cancer include viruses (particularly HPV 16 and 18), radiation, and UV light.

=== Tobacco ===
Tobacco is the greatest single cause of oral and pharyngeal cancer. Using tobacco increases the risk of oral cancer by 3 to 6 times and is responsible for around 40% of all oral cancers. Smokeless tobacco (including chewing tobacco, snuff, snus) also causes oral cancer. Cigar and pipe smoking are also important risk factors.

The use of electronic cigarettes may also lead to the development of head and neck cancers due to the substances like propylene glycol, glycerol, nitrosamines, and metals contained therein, which can cause damage to the airways.

Use of marijuana has currently not been shown to be associated with head and neck cancer risk.

=== Alcohol ===
Drinking alcohol is a major cause of oral cancer. It is responsible for about 20% of global oral cancer cases. The more alcohol is consumed regularly the higher the risk, but light to moderate drinking still somewhat increases the chances of getting oral cancer. The risk is especially high when both alcohol and tobacco are used.

It has been controversial if the use of alcohol-based mouthwashes increases oral cancer risk. As of 2024, there is some limited evidence supporting that the use of mouthwashes containing alcohol can increase the occurrence of oral cancer in some cases. There are complex interactions between alcohol content, usage patterns, reduction of oral pathogens, poor oral hygiene, smoking, and drinking which make any broad conclusion very tenuous in the absence of rigorously controlled studies. In subgroup analyses, various combinations of smoking, drinking alcohol, poor oral hygiene, and using mouthwash several times a day for 35 years or more significantly increased risk. Although alcohol is necessary to dissolve some active antimicrobial agents, Rao et al. advise reducing the alcohol content of mouthwashes if possible.

=== Human papillomavirus ===
Infection with human papillomavirus (HPV), particularly type 16, is a cause of oropharyngeal cancer (tonsils, base of tongue). However, its role in the genesis of oral cavity cancers is a matter of debate. A 2023 meta-analysis observed that the HPV was present 6% of all oral cavity cancer cases, however without establishing a role of this virus in the oncogenesis of these tumors. The authors even reported that some base of tongue tumors may have been misclassified as oral cavity tumors, therefore mistakenly increasing the rate of HPV-positive oral cavity cancers.

This HPV16 (along with HPV18) is the same virus responsible for the vast majority of all cervical cancers and is the most common sexually transmitted infection. Risk factors for developing HPV-positive oropharyngeal cancer include multiple sexual partners, anal and oral sex and a weak immune system.

=== Betel nut ===
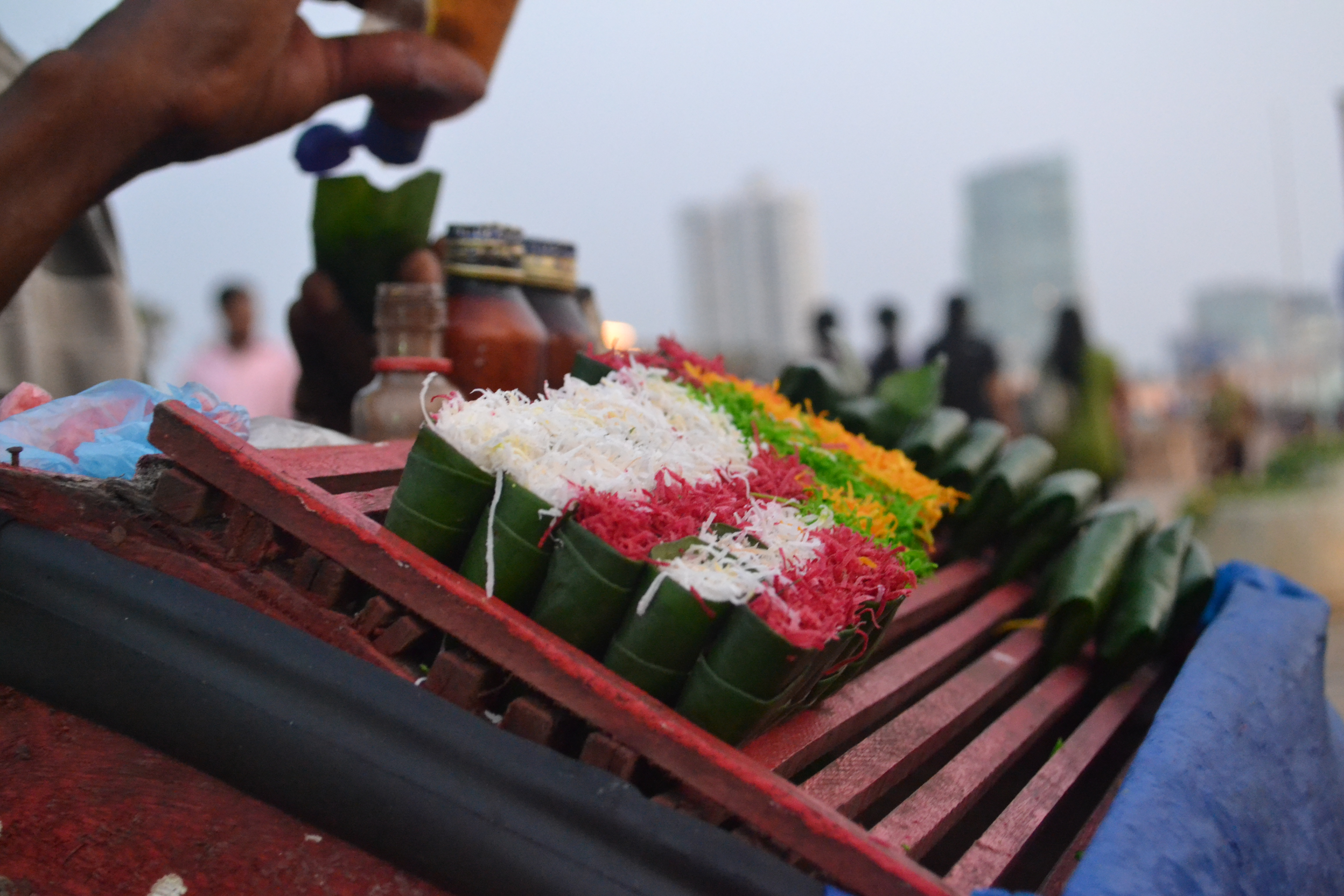
Stall selling betel quid

Chewing betel quid (paan) and Areca nut-based products is known to be a strong risk factor for developing oral cancer even in the absence of tobacco. It doubles the risk of oral cancer 2.1 times and when chewed with additional tobacco in its preparation (like in gutka), there is an even higher risk.

In India where such practices are common, oral cancer represents up to 40% of all cancers, compared to just 4% in the UK.

=== Stem cell transplantation ===
People after hematopoietic stem cell transplantation (HSCT) are at a higher risk for oral cancer. Post-HSCT oral cancer may have more aggressive behavior with poorer prognosis, when compared to oral cancer in people not treated with HSCT. This effect is supposed to be owing to the continuous lifelong immune suppression and chronic oral graft-versus-host disease.

=== Premalignant lesions ===
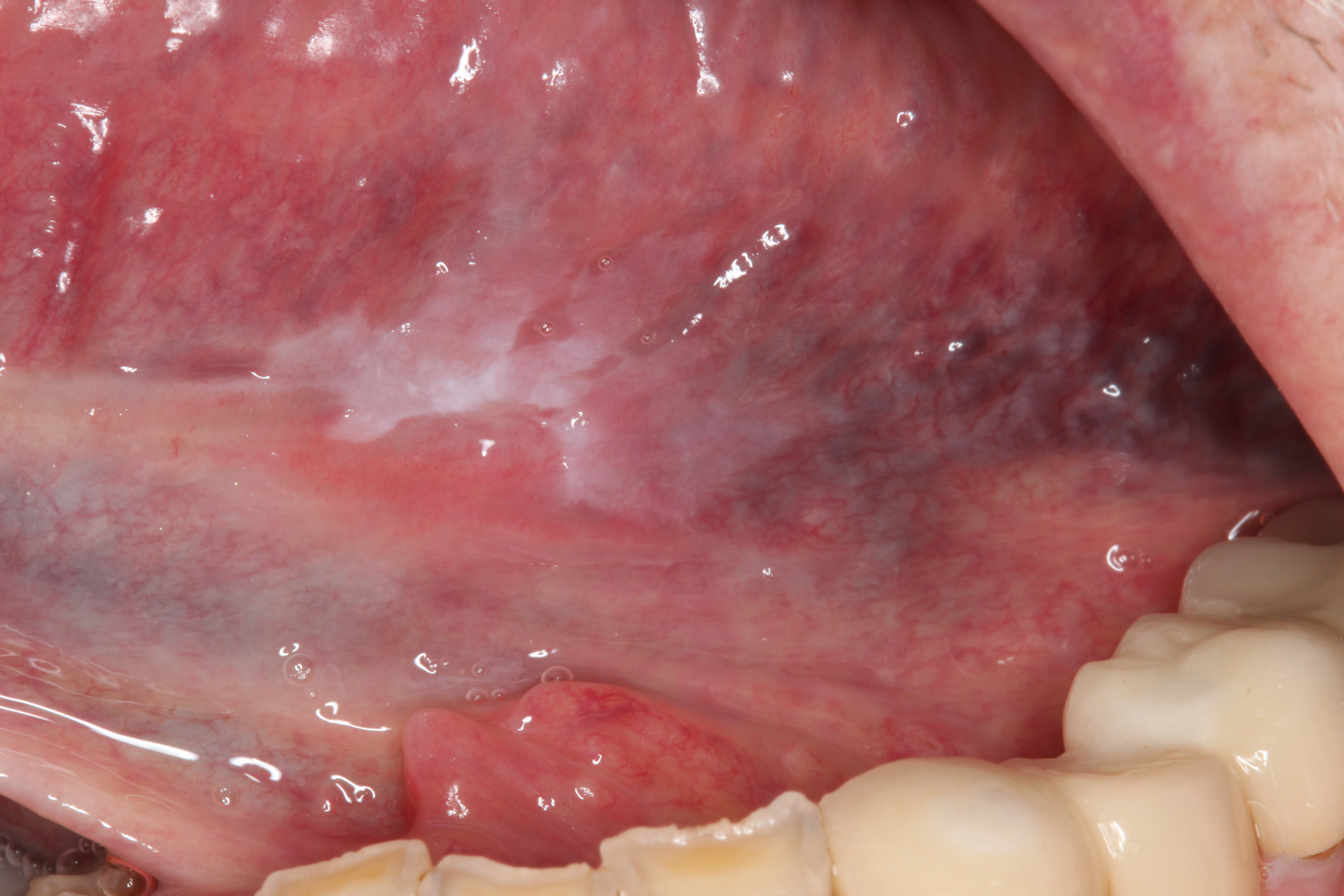
Oral leukoplakia (white patch) on the left tongue. Proven to be severe dysplasia on biopsy

A premalignant (or precancerous) lesion is defined as "a benign, morphologically altered tissue that has a greater than normal risk of malignant transformation." There are several different types of premalignant lesion that occur in the mouth. Some oral cancers begin as white patches (leukoplakia), red patches (erythroplakia) or mixed red and white patches (erythroleukoplakia or "speckled leukoplakia"). Other common premalignant lesions include oral submucous fibrosis and actinic cheilitis. In the Indian subcontinent oral submucous fibrosis is very common due to betel nut chewing. This condition is characterized by limited opening of mouth and burning sensation on eating of spicy food. This is a progressive lesion in which the opening of the mouth becomes progressively limited, and later on even normal eating becomes difficult.

== Pathophysiology ==
Oral squamous cell carcinoma is the end product of an unregulated proliferation of mucous basal cells. A single precursor cell is transformed into a clone consisting of many daughter cells with an accumulation of altered genes called oncogenes. What characterizes a malignant tumor over a benign one is its ability to metastasize. This ability is independent of the size or grade of the tumor (often seemingly slow growing cancers like the adenoid cystic carcinoma can metastasis widely). It is not just rapid growth that characterizes a cancer, but their ability to secrete enzymes, angiogeneic factors, invasion factors, growth factors and many other factors that allow it to spread.

The full causal relation between alcohol consumption and the elevated risk of cancer remains unclear, but acetaldehyde plays a major role. Immediately after alcohol consumption, there are elevated levels of acetaldehyde in saliva, peaking after about 2 minutes. Acetaldehyde is produced by the oral microbiome, and also by enzymes in the oral mucosa, saliva glands, and liver. It is also naturally present in alcoholic beverages. Of these, the microbiome is the major contributor, accounting for at least half of the acetaldehyde present. Poor oral hygiene, smoking, and heavy drinking induce an increase in acetaldehyde-producing bacteria in the mouth. Many species of bacteria contribute to acetaldehyde production and their epidemiological significance is not known. The acetaldehyde reacts with oral epithelial cells, inducing DNA modifications, which can lead to mutations and cancer development. The ability to metabolize acetaldehyde in the mouth is limited, so it may remain in the saliva for hours. L-cysteine tablets may be used to decrease acetaldehyde exposure in the oral cavity.

== Diagnosis ==
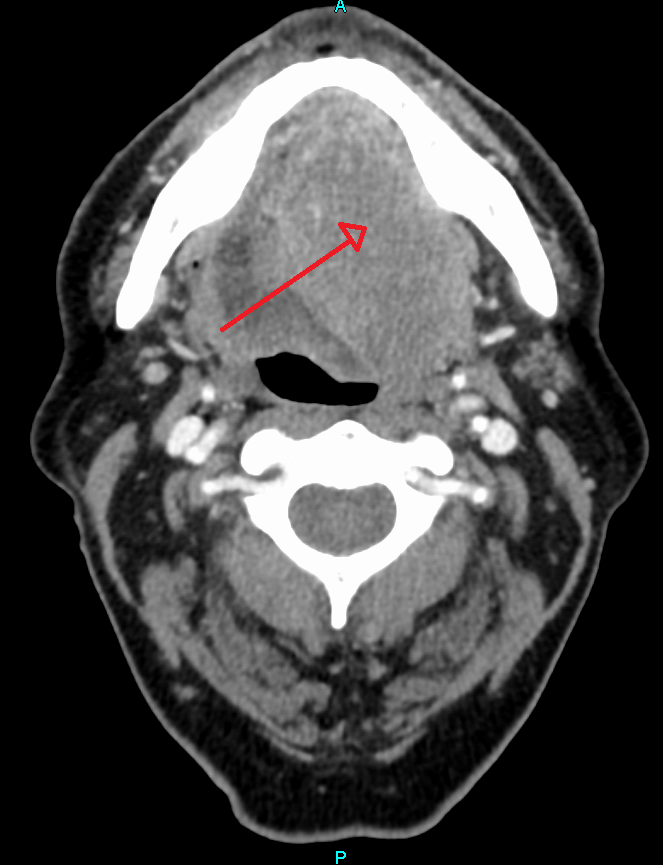
A large squamous cell carcinoma of the tongue as seen on CT imaging

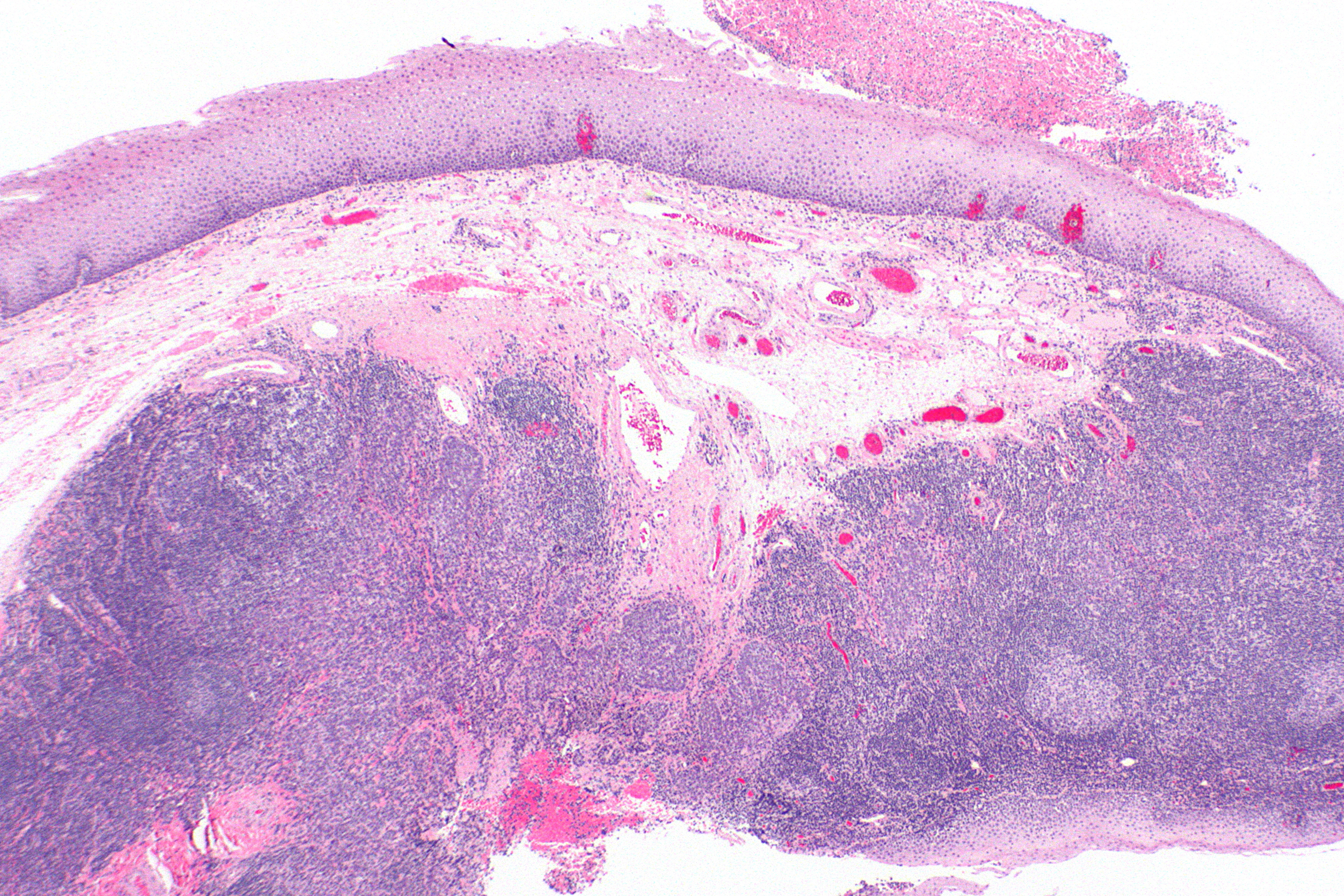
Histopathologic appearance of a poorly differentiated squamous cell carcinoma specimen. Hematoxylin-eosin stain. p16 positive, EBV negative

Diagnosis of oral cancer is completed for (1) initial diagnosis, (2) staging, and (3) treatment planning. A complete history, and clinical examination is first completed, then a wedge of tissue is cut from the suspicious lesion for tissue diagnosis. This might be done with scalpel biopsy, punch biopsy, fine or core needle biopsy. In this procedure, the surgeon cuts all, or a piece of the tissue, to have it examined under a microscope by a pathologist. Brush biopsies are not considered accurate for the diagnosis of oral cancer. Salivary biomarkers are also being under investigation with emerging outcomes and could potentially be used as a non-invasive diagnostic tool in the future.

With the first biopsy, the pathologist will provide a tissue diagnosis (e.g. squamous cell carcinoma), and classify the cell structure. They may add additional information that can be used in staging, and treatment planning, such as the mitotic rate, the depth of invasion, and the HPV status of the tissue.

After the tissue is confirmed cancerous, other tests will be completed to:

- better assess the size of the lesion (CT scan, MRI or PET scan with 18F-fluorodeoxyglucose (FDG)),
- look for other cancers in the upper aerodigestive tract (which may include endoscopy of the nasal cavity/pharynx, larynx, bronchus, and esophagus called panendoscopy or quadoscopy),
- spread to the lymph nodes (CT scan) or
- spread to other parts of the body (chest X-ray, nuclear medicine).

Other, more invasive tests, may also be completed such as fine needle aspiration, biopsy of lymph nodes, and sentinel node biopsy. When the cancer has spread to lymph nodes, their exact location, size, and spread beyond the capsule (of the lymph nodes) needs to be determined, as each can have a significant impact on treatment and prognosis. Small differences in the pattern of lymph node spread, can have a significant impact on treatment and prognosis. Panendoscopy may be recommended, because the tissues of the entire upper aerodigestive tract are generally affected by the same carcinogens, so other primary cancers are a common occurrence.

From these collective findings, taken in consideration with the health and desires of the person, the cancer team develops a plan for treatment. Since most oral cancers require surgical removal, a second set of histopathologic tests will be completed on any tumor removed to determine the prognosis, need for additional surgery, chemotherapy, radiation, immunotherapy, or other interventions.

=== Classification ===
Oral cancer is a subgroup of head and neck cancers which includes those of the oropharynx, larynx, nasal cavity and paranasal sinuses, salivary glands, and thyroid gland. Oral melanoma, while part of head and neck cancers is considered separately. Other cancers can occur in the mouth (such as bone cancer, lymphoma, or metastatic cancers from distant sites) but are also considered separately from oral cancers.

=== Staging ===
Oral cancer staging is an assessment of the degree of spread of the cancer from its original source. It is one of the factors affecting both the prognosis and the potential treatment of oral cancer.

The evaluation of squamous cell carcinoma of the mouth and pharynx staging uses the TNM classification (tumor, node, metastasis). This is based on the size of the primary tumor, lymph node involvement, and distant metastasis.

TNM classification cancer of the oral cavity (does not apply to HPV+ or HPV- oralpharyngeal cancers)

T: Primary tumor
TX	Primary tumor cannot be assessed	
Tis	Carcinoma in situ	
T1	Tumor ≤ 2 cm with depth of invasion (DOI*) ≤5mm	
T2	Tumor ≤ 2 cm with DOI* >5mm or tumor >2 cm and ≤ 4 cm with DOI* ≥10mm	
T3	Tumor > 2 cm and ≤4 cm with DOI* > 10mm or tumor >4 cm with DOI* ≤ 10mm	
T4	Moderately advanced or very advanced local disease	
	T4a	Moderately advanced local disease, tumor >4 cm with DOI* >10mm or tumor invades adjacent structures only (cortical bone of the mandible or maxilla (excluding superficial erosion of tooth socket alone in gingival tumors) or involves the maxillary sinus or skin of the face)
	T4b	Very advanced local disease. Tumor invades masticator space, pterygoid plates, or skull base and/or encases the internal carotid artery
*DOI is depth of invasion and not tumor thickness.

N: Clinical Lymph nodes (separate classification for pathologic classification)
NX	Regional lymph nodes cannot be assessed	
N0	No regional lymph node metastasis	
N1	Metastasis in a single ipsilateral lymph node, <3 cm and ENE(−)	
N2	Metastasis in a single ipsilateral lymph node, ≤3 cm or smaller and ENE(+) or >3 cm and ≤6 cm and ENE(−); or metastases in multiple ispsilateral lymph nodes, none >6 cm and ENE(−); or in bilateral or contralateral lymph nodes(s), non >6 cm ENE(−)	
	N2a	Metastasis in a single ipsilateral node <3 cm and ENE(+); or a single ipsilatereral node ≥3 cm and <6 cm and ENE(−)
	N2b	Metastases in multiple ipsilateral nodes, <6 cm and ENE(−)
	N2c	Metastases in bilateral or contralateral lymph node(s); <6 cm and ENE(−)
N3	Metastasis in a lymph node ≥6 cm and ENE(−); or metastasis in any node(s) and clinically overt ENE(+)	
	N3a	Metastasis in a lymph node ≥6 cm and ENE(−)
	N3b	Metastasis in any node(s) and clinically overt ENE(+)
Note: A designation of "U" or "L" may be used for any N category to indicate metastasis above (U) or below (L) the lower border of the cricoid. ENE(+/−) indicates presence or absence of extranodal disease

M: Metastasis
cM0	No distant metastasis
cM1	Distant metastasis
pM1	Distant metastasis, microscopically confirmed

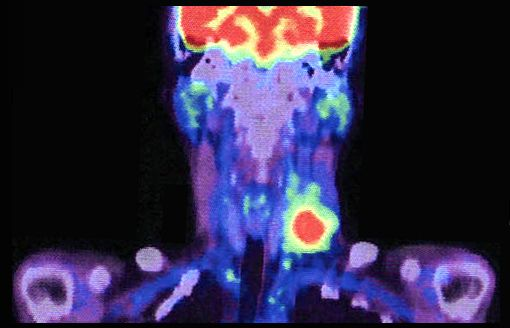
Spread of cancer beyond the capsule of a lymph node (ENE+)

TMN evaluation allows the person to be classified into a prognostic staging group;

AJCC Prognostic Stage Groups
When T is...	And N is...	And M is...	Then the stage group is...
Tis	N0	M0	0
T1	N0	M0	I
T2	N0	M0	II
T3	N0	M0	III
T1,T2,T3	N1	M0	III
T4a	N0,N1	M0	IVA
T1,T2,T3,T4a	N2	M0	IVA
Any T	N3	M0	IVB
T4b	Any N	M0	IVB
Any T	Any N	M1	IVC

== Screening ==
The gold standard for diagnosing oral cancer is biopsy with histopathological examination. A biopsy is invasive and unsuitable for large-scale screening. Dental visits often include a visual and tactile exam of the mouth and an assessment of oral cancer risk factors. This approach is recommended by the American Dental Association, the American Academy of Oral Medicine, the American Cancer Society, and the World Health Organization.

Dentists serve as primary gatekeepers for oral cancer screening and referral for biopsy or treatment but often lack sufficient training to perform this effectively. Screening accuracy in dental practice remains low. In a 2008 statistic, over half of oral cancers were found after spreading to the lymph nodes or other areas. Screening risks include false positives, unnecessary biopsies, and financial cost. Early detection improves survival and reduces disfigurement from treatment, though improving screening participation and accuracy among primary care providers was described in one review as "utopian".

Artificial intelligence shows potential to assist in diagnosing and managing oral diseases with high precision. Some researchers describe AI as essential to improving oral cancer detection and treatment. Reviews report AI imaging systems reaching about 89.9% sensitivity, 89.2% specificity, and 89.5% negative predictive value, similar to expert human performance. Implementation challenges remain, and there is no consensus on the most effective AI method. Studies have used optical coherence tomography, photographic imaging, autofluorescence spectroscopy, and thermal imaging, showing high variation in approach.

Oral cytology, or brush biopsy, has been studied as a less invasive diagnostic alternative to traditional biopsy. In this test, cells are collected from the lesion using a brush and examined in a laboratory. More research is needed before oral cytology can serve as a reliable screening tool. Micronuclei assays may help detect early malignant changes and improve survival outcomes. AI applications in histological diagnosis may also reduce diagnostic costs. Other screening methods, including toluidine blue staining and fluorescence imaging, have not shown enough evidence for routine use, though combining these techniques with AI systems has produced promising results.

The US Preventive Services Task Force in 2013 concluded that evidence was insufficient to determine the benefits and harms of screening adults without symptoms in primary care. A 2013 Cochrane review found that visual oral examination reduced mortality in high-risk individuals and improved survival in the general population, based on one study. The review has not been updated due to a lack of new randomized controlled trials. The World Health Organization in 2023 recommended screening only for high-risk groups, including users of tobacco, areca nut, alcohol, or combinations of these. The organization noted that positive results from some screening studies may be overstated or not generalizable. Similar concerns about publication bias and overestimated diagnostic performance have been stated for AI studies.

== Management ==
Post-operative image after removal of oral cancer with part of the mandible (feeding tube in nose)

Oral cancer (squamous cell carcinoma) is usually treated with surgery alone, or in combination with adjunctive therapy, including radiation, with or without chemotherapy. With small lesions (T1), surgery or radiation have similar control rates, so the decision about which to use is based on functional outcome, and complication rates.

=== Surgery ===
In most centres, removal of squamous cell carcinoma from the oral cavity and neck is achieved primarily through surgery. This also allows a detailed examination of the tissue for histopathologic characteristics, such as depth, and spread to lymph nodes that might require radiation or chemotherapy. For small lesions (T1–2), access to the oral cavity is through the mouth. When the lesion is larger, involves the bone of the maxilla or mandible, or access is limited due to mouth opening, the upper or lower lip is split, and the cheek pulled back to give greater access to the mouth. When the tumor involves the jaw bone, or when surgery or radiation will cause severe limited mouth opening, part of the bone is also removed with the tumor.

AI diagnostic imaging shows potential in laser-assisted surgery.

==== Management of the neck ====
Common scar line after cervical lymph node dissection

Spread of cancer from the oral cavity to the lymph nodes of the neck has a significant effect on survival. Between 60 and 70% of people with early stage oral cancer will have no lymph node involvement of the neck clinically, but 20–30% of those people (or up to 20% of all those affected) will have clinically undetectable spread of cancer to the lymph nodes of the neck (called occult disease).

The management of the neck is crucial, since spread to it reduces the chance of survival by 50%. If there is evidence of lymph node involvement of the neck, during the diagnostic phase, then a modified radical neck dissection is generally performed. Where the neck lymph nodes have no evidence of involvement clinically, but the oral cavity lesion is high risk for spread (e.g. T2 or above lesions), then a neck dissection of the lymph nodes above the level of the omohyoid muscle may be completed. T1 lesions that are 4 mm or greater in thickness have a significant risk of spread to neck nodes. When disease if found in the nodes after removal (but not seen clinically) the recurrence rates is 10–24%. If post-operative radiation is added, the failure rate is 0–15%. When lymph nodes are clinically found during the diagnosis phase, and radiation is added post-operative, disease control is >80%.

=== Radiotherapy and chemotherapy ===
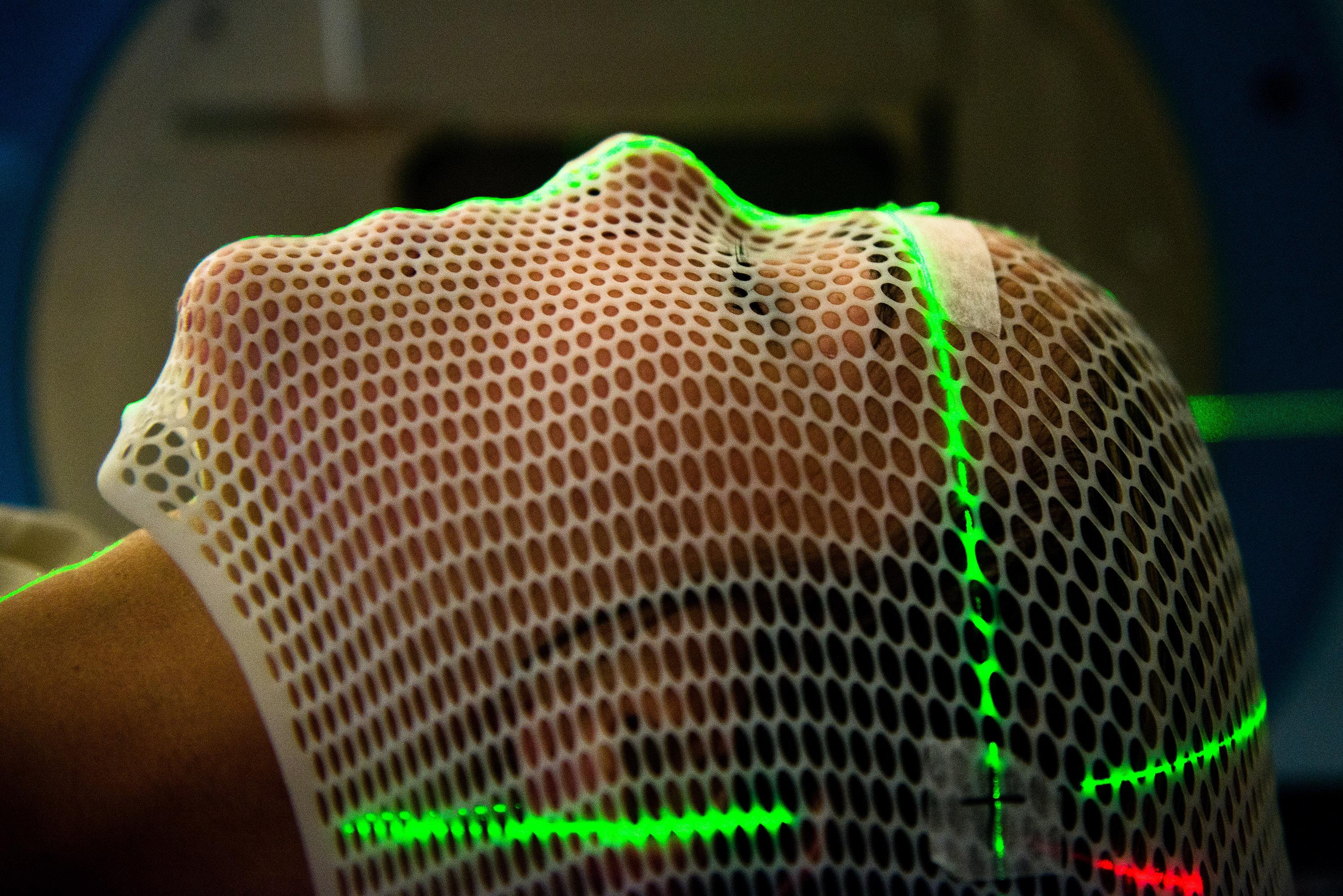
Radiation treatment

Chemotherapy and radiotherapy are most often used, as an adjunct to surgery, to control oral cancer that is greater than stage 1, or has spread to either regional lymph nodes or other parts of the body. Radiotherapy alone can be used instead of surgery, for very small lesions, but is generally used as an adjunct when lesions are large, cannot be completely removed, or have spread to the lymph nodes of the neck. Chemotherapy is useful in oral cancers when used in combination with other treatment modalities such as radiation therapy but it is not used alone as a monotherapy. When a cure is unlikely, it can also be used to extend life and can be considered palliative but not curative care.

Monoclonal antibody therapy (with agents such as cetuximab) have been shown to be effective in the treatment of squamous cell head and neck cancers, and are likely to have an increasing role in the future management of this condition when used in conjunction with other established treatment modalities, although it is not a replacement for chemotherapy in head and neck cancers. Likewise, molecularly targeted therapies and immunotherapies may be effective for the treatment of oral and oropharyngeal cancers. Adding epidermal growth factor receptor monoclonal antibody (EGFR mAb) to standard treatment may increase survival, keeping the cancer limited to that area of the body and may decrease reappearance of the cancer.

=== Rehabilitation ===
Following treatment, rehabilitation may be necessary to improve movement, chewing, swallowing, and speech. Speech and language pathologists may be involved at this stage. Treatment of oral cancer will usually be by a multidisciplinary team, with treatment professionals from the realms of radiation, surgery, chemotherapy, nutrition, dentistry, and even psychology all possibly involved with diagnosis, treatment, rehabilitation, and care. Due to the location of oral cancer, there may be a period where the person requires a tracheotomy and feeding tube.

== Prognosis ==
Survival rates for oral cancer depend on the precise site and the stage of the cancer at diagnosis. Overall, 2011 data from the SEER database shows that survival is around 57% at five years when all stages of initial diagnosis, all genders, all ethnicities, all age groups, and all treatment modalities are considered. Survival rates for stage 1 cancers are approximately 90%, hence the emphasis on early detection to increase survival outcome for people. Similar survival rates are reported from other countries, such as Germany.

== Epidemiology ==
Deaths from mouth and oropharynx cancers per million people in 2012: 0–8 9–11 12–15 16–18 19–24 25–31 32–40 41–55 56–75 76–156

Globally, it occurred in about 355,000 people and resulted in 177,000 deaths in 2018. Of these 355,000, about 246,000 are males and 108,000 are females.

In 2013, oral cancer resulted in 135,000 deaths, up from 84,000 deaths in 1990. Oral cancer occurs more often in people from lower and middle income countries.

As of 2025, it is the fastest growing cancer among young men in Western countries, and is in most cases related to HPV, the most common sexually transmitted infection globally. As of 2025, oropharyngeal cancers caused by the virus have more than doubled in the last 30 years, especially in males.

=== Europe ===
Europe places second-highest after Southeast Asia among all continents for age-standardised rate (ASR) specific to oral and oropharyngeal cancer. It is estimated that there were 61,400 cases of oral and lip cancer within Europe in 2012. Hungary recorded the highest number of mortality and morbidity due to oral and pharyngeal cancer among all European countries while Cyprus reported the lowest numbers

==== United Kingdom ====
British Cancer Research found 2,386 deaths due to oral cancer in 2014; while most oral cancer cases are diagnosed in older adults between 50 and 74 years old, this condition can affect the young as well; 6% of people affected by oral cancer are under 45 years of age. The United Kingdom is 16th-lowest for males and 11th-highest for females for oral cancer incidence among Europe. Additionally, there is a regional variability within the United Kingdom, with Scotland and northern England having higher rates than southern England. The same analysis applies to lifetime risk of developing oral cancer, as in Scotland it is 1.84% in males and 0.74% in females, higher than the rest of the UK, being 1.06% and 0.48%, respectively.

Oral cancer is the sixteenth most-common cancer in the United Kingdom (around 6,800 people were diagnosed with oral cancer in the United Kingdom in 2011), and it is the 19th most-common cause of cancer death (around 2,100 people died from the disease in 2012).

==== Northern Europe ====
The highest incidence of oral and pharyngeal cancer was recorded in Denmark, with age-standardised rates per 100,000 of 13.0, followed by Lithuania (9.9) and the United Kingdom (9.8). Lithuania reported the highest incidence in men while Denmark reported the highest in women. The highest rates for mortality in 2012 were reported in Lithuania (7.5), Estonia (6.0), and Latvia (5.4). Incidence of oral cancer in young adults (ages 20–39 years old) in Scandinavia has reportedly risen approximately 6-fold between 1960 and 1994 The high incidence rate of oral and pharyngeal cancer in Denmark could be attributed to their higher alcohol intake than citizens of other Scandinavian countries and low intake of fruits and vegetables in general.

==== Eastern Europe ====
Hungary (23.3), Slovakia (16.4), and Romania (15.5) reported the highest incidences of oral and pharyngeal cancer. Hungary also recorded the highest incidence in both genders as well as the highest mortality rates in Europe. It is ranked third globally for cancer mortality rates. Cigarette smoking, excessive alcohol consumption, inequalities in the care received by people with cancer, and gender-specific systemic risk factors have been determined as the leading causes for the high morbidity and mortality rates in Hungary.

==== Western Europe ====
The incidence rates of oral cancer in western Europe found France, Germany and Belgium to be highest. The ASRs (per 100,000) were 15.0, 14.6, and 14.1, respectively. When filtered by gender category, the same countries rank top 3 for male, however, in different order of Belgium (21.9), Germany (23.1), and France (23.1). France, Belgium, and the Netherlands rank highest for females, with ASRs 7.6, 7.0, and 7.0, respectively.

==== Southern Europe ====
Incidence of oral and oropharyngeal cancers were recorded, finding Portugal, Croatia and Serbia to have highest rates (ASR per 100,000). These values are 15.4, 12, and 11.7, respectively.

=== North America ===
It is the eleventh-most-common cancer in the United States among males while in Canada and Mexico it is the twelfth and thirteenth-most-common cancer respectively. The ASIR for lip and oral cavity cancer among men in Canada and Mexico is 4.2 and 3.1, respectively.

Of all the cancers, oral cancer attributes to 3% in males, opposed to 2% in women. New cases of oral cancer in US as of 2013, approximated almost 66,000 with almost 14000 attributed from tongue cancer, and nearly 12000 from the mouth, and the remainder from the oral cavity and pharynx. In the previous year, 1.6% of lip and oral cavity cancers were diagnosed, where the age-standardised incidence rate (ASIR) across all geographic regions of United States of America estimates at 5.2 per 100,000 population.

In 2022, close to 54,000 Americans are projected to be diagnosed with oral or oropharyngeal cancer. 66% of the time, these will be found as late stage three and four disease. It will cause over 8,000 deaths. Of those newly diagnosed, only slightly more than half will be alive in five years. Similar survival estimates are reported from other countries. For example, five-year relative survival for oral cavity cancer in Germany is about 55%. In the US oral cancer accounts for about 8 percent of all malignant growths.

Oral cancers overall risk higher in black males opposed to white males, however specific oral cancers-such as of the lip, have a higher risk in white males opposed to black males. Overall, rates of oral cancer between gender groups (male and female) seem to be decreasing, according to data from 3 studies.

=== South America ===
The ASIR across all geographic regions of South America as of 2012 sits at 3.8 per 100,000 population where approximately 6,046 deaths have occurred due to lip and oral cavity cancer, where the age-standardized mortality rate remains at 1.4.

In Brazil, however, lip and oral cavity cancer is the 7th most common cancer, with an estimated 6,930 new cases diagnosed in the year 2012. This number is rising and has an overall higher ASIR at 7.2 per 100,000 population whereby an approx 3000 deaths have occurred

Rates are increasing across both males and females. As of 2017, almost 50000 new cases of oropharyngeal cancers will be diagnosed, with incidence rates being more than twice as high in men than women.

=== Asia ===
Oral cancer is one of the most-common types of cancer in Asia due to its association with smoking (tobacco, bidi), betel quid and alcohol consumption. Regionally incidence varies with highest rates in South Asia, particularly India, Bangladesh, Sri Lanka, Pakistan, and Afghanistan. In South East Asia and Arab countries, although the prevalence is not as high, estimated incidences of oral cancer ranged from 1.6 to 8.6/ 100,000 and 1.8 to 2.13/ 100,000 respectively. According to GLOBOCAN 2012, the estimated age-standardised rates of cancer incidence and mortality was higher in males than females. However, in some areas, specifically South East Asia, similar rates were recorded for both genders. In 2012, there were 97,400 deaths recorded due to oral cancer.

==== India ====
Oral cancer is the third-most-common form of cancer in India with over 77 000 new cases diagnosed in 2012 (2.3:1 male to female ratio). Studies estimate over five deaths per hour. One of the reasons behind such high incidence might be popularity of betel and areca nuts, which are considered to be risk factors for development of oral cavity cancers.

=== Africa ===
There is limited data for the prevalence of oral cancer in Africa. The following rates describe the number of new cases (for incidence rates) or deaths (for mortality rates) per 100 000 individuals per year.

The incidence rate of oral cancer is 2.6 for both sexes. The rate is higher in males at 3.3 and lower in females at 2.0.

The mortality rate is lower than the incidence rate at 1.6 for both sexes. The rate is again higher for males at 2.1 and lower for females at 1.3.

=== Australia ===
The following rates describe the number of new cases or deaths per 100 000 individuals per year. The incidence rate of oral cancer is 6.3 for both sexes; this is higher in males at 6.8–8.8 and lower in females at 3.7–3.9. The mortality rate is significantly lower than the incidence rate at 1.0 for both sexes. The rate is higher in males at 1.4 and lower in females at 0.6. Table 1 provides age-standardised incidence and mortality rates for oral cancer based on the location in the mouth. The location 'other mouth' refers to the buccal mucosa, the vestibule and other unspecified parts of the mouth. The data suggests lip cancer has the highest incidence rate while gingival cancer has the lowest rate overall. In terms of mortality rates, oropharyngeal cancer has the highest rate in males and tongue cancer has the highest rate in females. Lip, palatal and gingival cancer have the lowest mortality rates overall.

Table 1: Age-standardised incidence and mortality rates of oral cancer (per 100 000 individuals per year) in Australia between 1982 and 2008. Adapted from Farah, Simanovic and Dost (2014) .
Location	Incidence per 100 000 individuals per year			Mortality per 100 000 individuals per year		
Location	Both sexes	Males	Females	Both sexes	Males	Females
Lip	5.3	8.4	2.4	0.1	0.1	0.0
Tongue	2.4	3.3	1.4	0.7	1.1	0.4
Gingivae	0.3	0.4	0.3	0.1	0.1	0.0
Floor of mouth	0.9	1.4	0.5	0.2	0.3	0.1
Palate	0.6	0.7	0.4	0.1	0.2	0.1
Other Mouth	0.7	0.8	0.6	0.2	0.2	0.1
Major salivary glands	1.2	1.6	0.9	0.3	0.4	0.2
Oropharynx	1.9	3.0	0.8	0.7	1.2	0.3

== Other animals ==
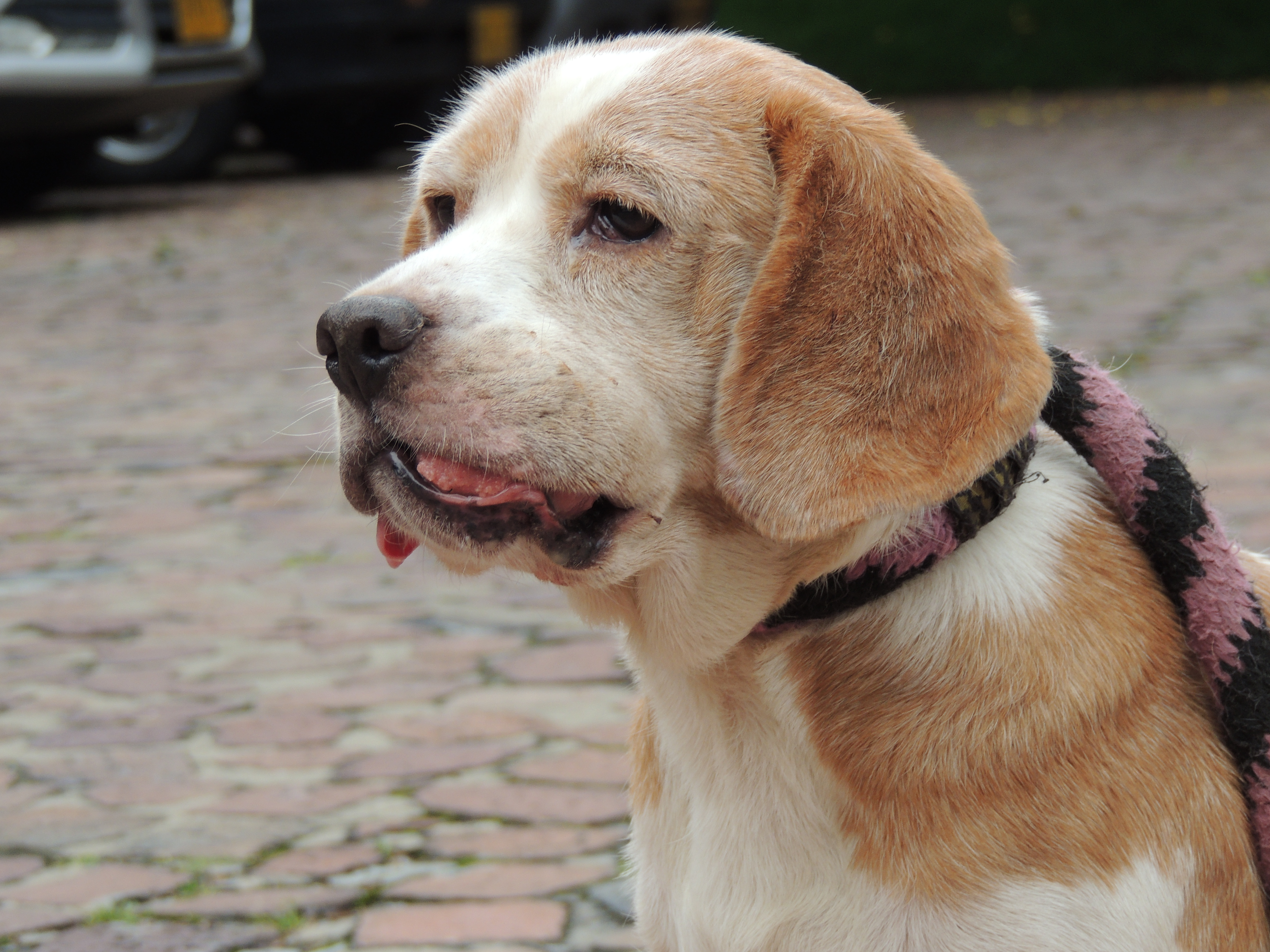
A beagle with oral cancer

Oral cancers are the fourth most common type seen in other animals in veterinary medicine, with older animals having higher chances of developing it.

Dogs that are a breed that is at higher risk of developing oral cancer are more susceptible. Tumors that are found early in development can be removed by surgery, however some cases involve removing a part of the jaw. Chemotherapy is used following surgeries or to remove a tumor that cannot be accessed. Tumors that are caught when the cancer has already spread to other places of the body will result in the dog living for only 6-12 more months.

The most common type of oral cancer seen in cats is squamous cell carcinoma. Due to tumors developing in hidden spots such as beneath the tongue, when the tumors in the cats mouth are caught it is often untreatable. Risk factors include secondhand smoke, as the smoke settles on the fur which is ingested when cats groom, and potentially the over consumption of canned food and use of flea collars.
