= Actinic cheilitis =

- Other names: Atinic cheilosis, Atinic keratosis of lip, Solar cheilosis,Sailor's lip, Farmer's lip
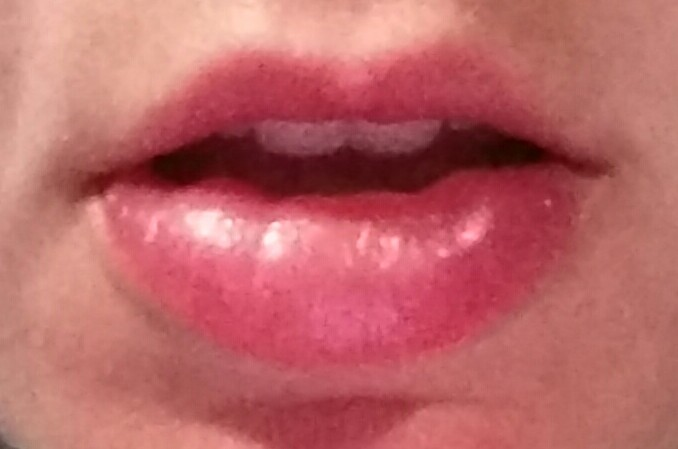
- Picture of actinic cheilitis. This is also known as sailor's lip or farmer's lip.
- Specialty: Dermatology

Actinic cheilitis (AC) is cheilitis (lip inflammation) caused by long-term sunlight exposure. Essentially, it is a burn and a variant of actinic keratosis which occurs on the lip. It is a premalignant condition, as it can develop into squamous cell carcinoma (a type of mouth cancer).

== Signs and symptoms ==
AC almost always affects the lower lip and only rarely the upper lip, probably because the lower lip is more exposed to the sun. In the unusual cases reported where it affects the upper lip, this may be due to upper lip prominence. The commissures (corners of the mouth) are not usually involved.

Affected individuals may experience symptoms such as a dry sensation and cracking of the lips. It is usually painless and persistent.

The appearance is variable. White lesions indicate hyperkeratosis. Red, erosive or ulcerative lesions indicate atrophy, loss of epithelium and inflammation. Early, acute lesions may be erythematous (red) and edematous (swollen). With months and years of sun exposure, the lesion becomes chronic and may be grey-white in color and appear dry, scaly and wrinkled.

There is thickening whitish discoloration of the lip at the border of the lip and skin. There is also a loss of the usually sharp border between the red of the lip and the normal skin, known as the vermillion border. The lip may become scaly and indurated as AC progresses.

When palpated, the lip may have a texture similar to rubbing the gloved finger along sandpaper.

AC may occur with skin lesions of actinic keratosis or skin cancer elsewhere, particularly on the head and neck since these are the most sun exposed areas. Rarely it may represent a genetic susceptibility to light damage (e.g. xeroderma pigmentosum or actinic prurigo).

== Causes ==
AC is caused by chronic and excessive exposure to ultraviolet radiation in sunlight.

Risk factors include:

- Outdoor lifestyle: e.g. farmers, sailors, fishermen, windsurfers, mountaineers, golfers, etc. This has given rise to synonyms for this condition such as "sailor's lip" and "farmer's lip". The prevalence in agricultural workers in a semi-arid region of Brazil is reported to be 16.7%.
- Light skin complexion: the condition typically affects individuals with lighter skin tones, particularly Caucasians living in tropical regions. In one report, 96% of persons with AC had phenotype II according to the Fitzpatrick scale.
- Age: AC typically affects older individuals, and rarely those under the age of 45.
- Gender: the condition affects males more commonly than females. Sometimes this ratio is reported as high as 10:1.

Additional factors may also play a role, including tobacco use, lip irritation, poor oral hygiene, and ill-fitting dentures.

== Diagnosis ==
Tissue biopsy is indicated.

== Prevention ==
To prevent AC from developing, protective measures could be undertaken such as avoiding mid-day sun, or use of a broad-brimmed hat, lip balm with anti UVA and UVB ingredients (e.g. para-aminobenzoic acid), or sun blocking agents (e.g. zinc oxide, titanium oxide) prior to sun exposure.

== Treatment ==
This condition is considered premalignant because it may lead to squamous cell carcinoma in about 10% of all cases. It is not possible to predict which cases will progress into SCC, so the current consensus is that all lesions should be treated.

Treatment options include 5-fluorouracil, imiquimod, scalpel vermillionectomy, chemical peel, electrosurgery, and carbon dioxide laser vaporization. These curative treatments attempt to destroy or remove the damaged epithelium. All methods are associated with some degree of pain, edema, and a relatively low rate of recurrence.

=== Medication ===
Topical 5-fluorouracil (5-FU, Efudex, Carac) has been shown to be an effective therapy for diffuse, but minor actinic cheilitis. 5-fluorouracil works by blocking DNA synthesis. Cells that are rapidly growing need more DNA, so they accumulate more 5-fluorouracil, resulting in their death. Normal skin is much less affected. The treatment usually takes 2–4 weeks depending on the response. The typical response includes an inflammatory phase, followed by redness, burning, oozing, and finally erosion. Treatment is stopped when ulceration and crusting appear. There is minimal scarring. Complete clearance has been reported in about 50% of patients.

Imiquimod (Aldara) is an immune response modifier that has been studied for the treatment of actinic cheilitis. It promotes an immune response in the skin leading to apoptosis (death) of the tumor cells. It causes the epidermis to be invaded by macrophages, which leads to epidermal erosion. T-cells are also activated as a result of imiquimod treatment. Imiquimod appears to promote an "immune memory" that reduces the recurrence of lesions. There is minimal scarring. Complete clearance has been demonstrated in up to 45% of patients with actinic keratoses. However, the dose and duration of therapy, as well as the long-term efficacy, still need to be established in the treatment of actinic cheilitis.

=== Procedures ===
Both cryosurgery and electrosurgery are effective choices for small areas of actinic cheilitis. Cryosurgery is accomplished by applying liquid nitrogen in an open spraying technique. Local anesthesia is not required, but treatment of the entire lip can be quite painful. Cure rates in excess of 96% have been reported. Cryosurgery is the treatment of choice for focal areas of actinic cheilitis. Electrosurgery is an alternate treatment, but local anesthesia is required, making it less practical than cryosurgery. With both techniques, adjacent tissue damage can delay healing and promote scar formation.

More extensive or recurring areas of actinic cheilitis may be treated with either a shave vermillionectomy or a carbon dioxide laser. The shave vemillionectomy removes a portion of the vermillion border but leaves the underlying muscle intact. Considerable bleeding can occur during the procedure due to the vascular nature of the lip. A linear scar may also form after treatment, but this can usually be minimized with massage and steroids. Healing time is short, and effectiveness is very high.

A newer procedure uses a carbon dioxide laser to ablate the vermillion border. This treatment is relatively quick and easy to perform, but it requires a skilled operator. Anesthesia is usually required. Secondary infection and scarring can occur with laser ablation. In most cases, the scar is minimal, and responds well to steroids. Pain can be a progressive problem during the healing phase, which can last three weeks or more. However, the carbon dioxide laser also offers a very high success rate, with very few recurrences.

Chemical peeling with 50% trichloroacetic acid has also been evaluated, but results have been poor. Healing usually takes 7–10 days with very few side effects. However, limited studies show that the success rate may be lower than 30%.

== Epidemiology ==
It is a common condition.
