= White roll =

Line bordering the top of the upper lip

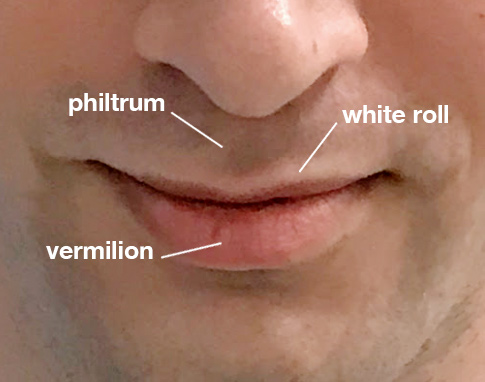
White roll on lips

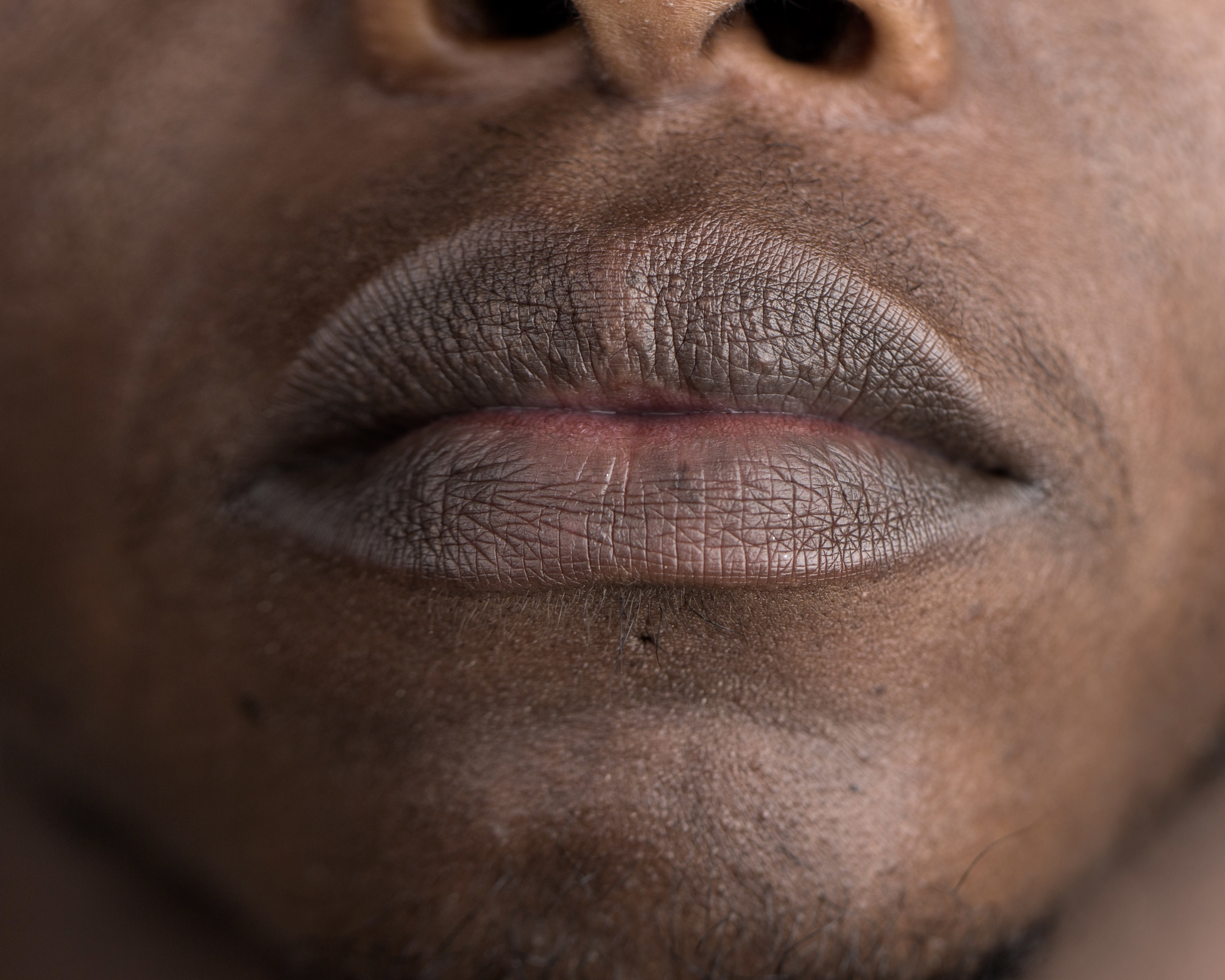
Lips of a black man, with the white roll visible as a lighter-coloured region.

White roll is the white line that borders the top of the upper lip. It is an adnexal mass of specialized glands and fat. White roll occurs naturally for nearly everyone, although it can be not white and less visible for dark skinned individuals. Well defined white roll indicates youthfulness and is considered aesthetically pleasing.

With age, white roll often becomes less defined. This is due to sun damage, changes in facial fat, and decreasing collagen in the area right above the lip. White roll can also be accentuated using injectable fillers.

Sometimes white roll is absent or damaged, due to trauma or cleft lip, in which case it could be reconstructed with plastic surgery. However, it is difficult to achieve satisfactory results using surgery, because malalignment of even a millimeter is noticeable and unattractive. It is therefore sometimes tattooed instead.

== See also ==
- Lip
- Cupid's bow
- Vermilion border
