= Lip =

Visible body parts at the mouth

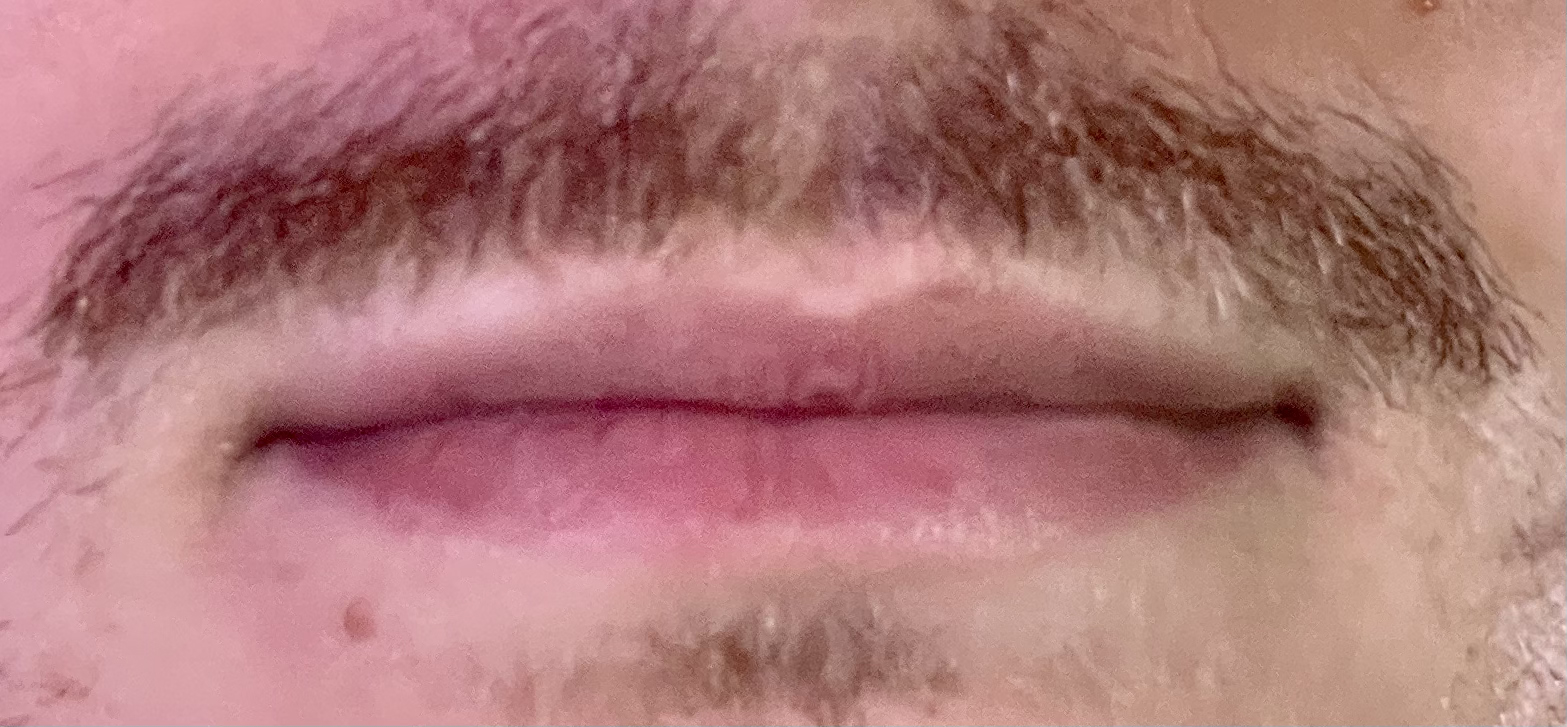
- Human lips

Details
- Artery: Inferior labial, superior labial
- Vein: Inferior labial, superior labial
- Nerve: Frontal, infraorbital

Identifiers
- Latin: labia oris
- MeSH: D008046
- TA98: A05.1.01.005
- TA2: 2775
- FMA: 59816

The lips are a horizontal pair of soft appendages attached to the jaws and are the most visible part of the mouth of many animals, including humans. Mammal lips are soft, movable and serve to facilitate the ingestion of food (e.g. suckling and gulping) and the articulation of sound and speech. Human lips are also a somatosensory organ, and can be an erogenous zone when used in kissing and other acts of intimacy.

== Structure ==
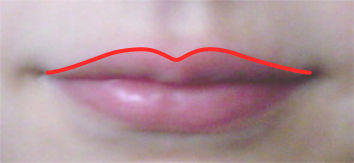
Cupid's bow feature of a human lip

The upper and lower lips are referred to as the labium superius oris and labium inferius oris, respectively. The juncture where the lips meet the surrounding skin of the mouth area is the vermilion border, and the typically reddish area within the borders is called the vermilion zone. The vermilion border of the upper lip is known as the Cupid's bow. The fleshy protuberance located in the center of the upper lip is a tubercle known by various terms including the procheilon (also spelled prochilon), the "tuberculum labii superioris", and the "labial tubercle". The vertical groove extending from the procheilon to the nasal septum is called the philtrum.

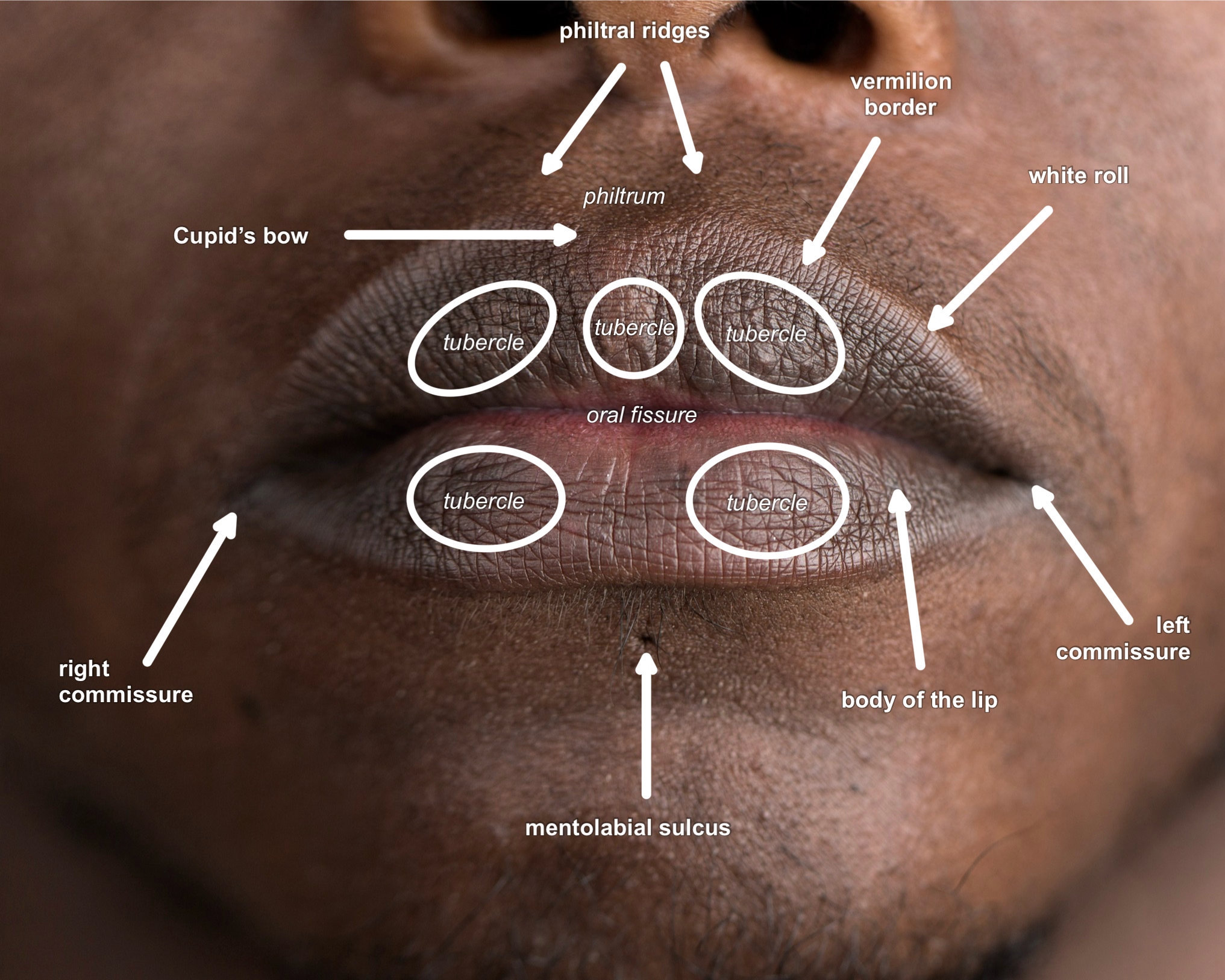
Surface anatomy of an adult human's lips.

The skin of the lip, with three to five cellular layers, is very thin compared to typical face skin, which has up to 16 layers. With light skin color, the lip skin contains fewer melanocytes (cells which produce melanin pigment, which give skin its color). Because of this, the blood vessels appear through the skin of the lips, which leads to their notable red coloring. With darker skin color this effect is less prominent, as in this case the skin of the lips contains more melanin and thus is visually darker. The skin of the lip forms the border between the exterior skin of the face, and the interior mucous membrane of the inside of the mouth.

The lip skin is not hairy and does not have sweat glands. Therefore, it does not have the usual protection layer of sweat and body oils which keep the skin smooth, inhibit pathogens, and regulate warmth. For these reasons, the lips dry out faster and become chapped more easily.

The lower lip is formed from the mandibular prominence, a branch of the first pharyngeal arch. The lower lip covers the anterior body of the mandible. It is lowered by the depressor labii inferioris muscle and the orbicularis oris borders it inferiorly.

The upper lip covers the anterior surface of the body of the maxilla. Its upper half is of usual skin color and has a depression at its center, directly under the nasal septum, called the philtrum, which is Latin for "lower nose", while its lower half is a markedly different, red-colored skin tone more similar to the color of the inside of the mouth, and the term vermillion refers to the colored portion of either the upper or lower lip.

It is raised by the levator labii superioris and is connected to the lower lip by the thin lining of the lip itself.

Thinning of the vermilion of the upper lip and flattening of the philtrum are two of the facial characteristics of fetal alcohol syndrome, a lifelong disability caused by the mother's consumption of alcohol during pregnancy.

=== Microanatomy ===
The skin of the lips is stratified squamous epithelium. The mucous membrane is represented by a large area in the sensory cortex, and is therefore highly sensitive. The frenulum labii inferioris is the frenulum of the lower lip. The frenulum labii superioris is the frenulum of the upper lip.

=== Nerve supply ===
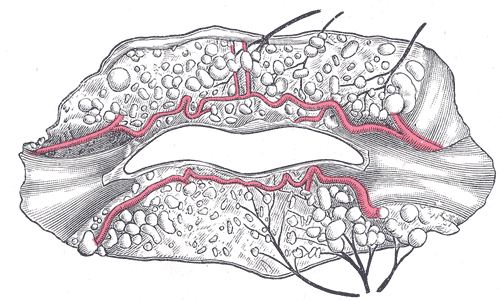
Illustration of lips from Gray's Anatomy showing the inferior and superior labial arteries, the glands of the lips, and the nerves of the right side seen from the posterior surface after removal of the mucous membrane

- Trigeminal nerve
  - The infraorbital nerve is a branch of the maxillary branch. It supplies not only the upper lip but also much of the skin of the face between the upper lip and the lower eyelid, except for the bridge of the nose.
  - The mental nerve is a branch of the mandibular branch (via the inferior alveolar nerve). It supplies the skin and mucous membrane of the lower lip and labial gingiva (gum) anteriorly.

=== Blood supply ===
The facial artery is one of the six non-terminal branches of the external carotid artery.

This artery supplies both lips by its superior and inferior labial branches. Each of the two branches bifurcate and anastomose with their companion branch from the other terminal.

=== Muscles ===
The muscles acting on the lips are considered part of the muscles of facial expression. All muscles of facial expression are derived from the mesoderm of the second pharyngeal arch and are therefore supplied (motor supply) by the nerve of the second pharyngeal arch, the facial nerve (7th cranial nerve). The muscles of facial expression are all specialized members of the panniculus carnosus, which attach to the dermis and so wrinkle or dimple the overlying skin. Functionally, the muscles of facial expression are arranged in groups around the orbits, nose, and mouth.

The muscles acting on the lips:

- Buccinator
- Orbicularis oris (a complex of muscles, formerly thought to be a single sphincter or ring of muscle)
- Anchor point for several muscles
  - Modiolus
- Lip elevation
  - Levator labii superioris
  - levator labii superioris alaeque nasi
  - Levator anguli oris
  - Zygomaticus minor
  - Zygomaticus major
- Lip depression
  - Risorius
  - Depressor anguli oris
  - Depressor labii inferioris
  - Mentalis

== Functions ==
=== Food intake ===
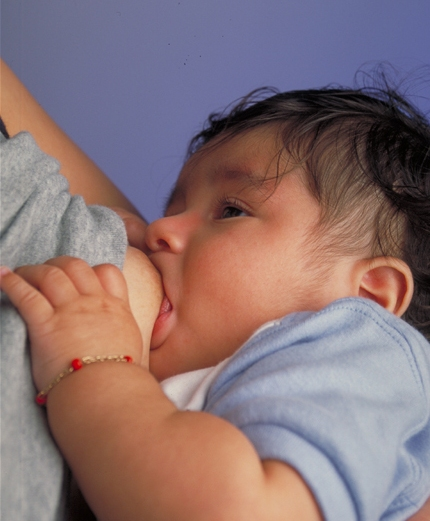
Breastfeeding

Because they have their own muscles and bordering muscles, the lips are easily movable. Lips are used for eating functions, like holding food or to get it in the mouth. In addition, lips serve to close the mouth airtight shut, to hold food and drink inside, and to keep out unwanted objects. Through making a narrow funnel with the lips, the suction of the mouth is increased. This suction is essential for babies to breast feed. Lips can also be used to suck in other contexts, such as sucking on a straw to drink liquids.

=== Articulation ===
The lips serve for creating different sounds—mainly labial, bilabial, and labiodental consonant sounds as well as vowel rounding—and thus are an important part of the speech apparatus. The lips enable whistling and the performing of wind instruments such as the trumpet, clarinet, flute, and saxophone. People who have hearing loss may unconsciously or consciously lip read to understand speech without needing to perceive the actual sounds, and visual cues from the lips affect the perception of what sounds have been heard, for example the McGurk effect.

=== Tactile organ ===
The lip has many nerve endings and reacts as part of the tactile (touch) senses. Lips are very sensitive to touch, warmth, and cold. It is therefore an important aid for exploring unknown objects for babies and toddlers.

=== Erogenous zone ===
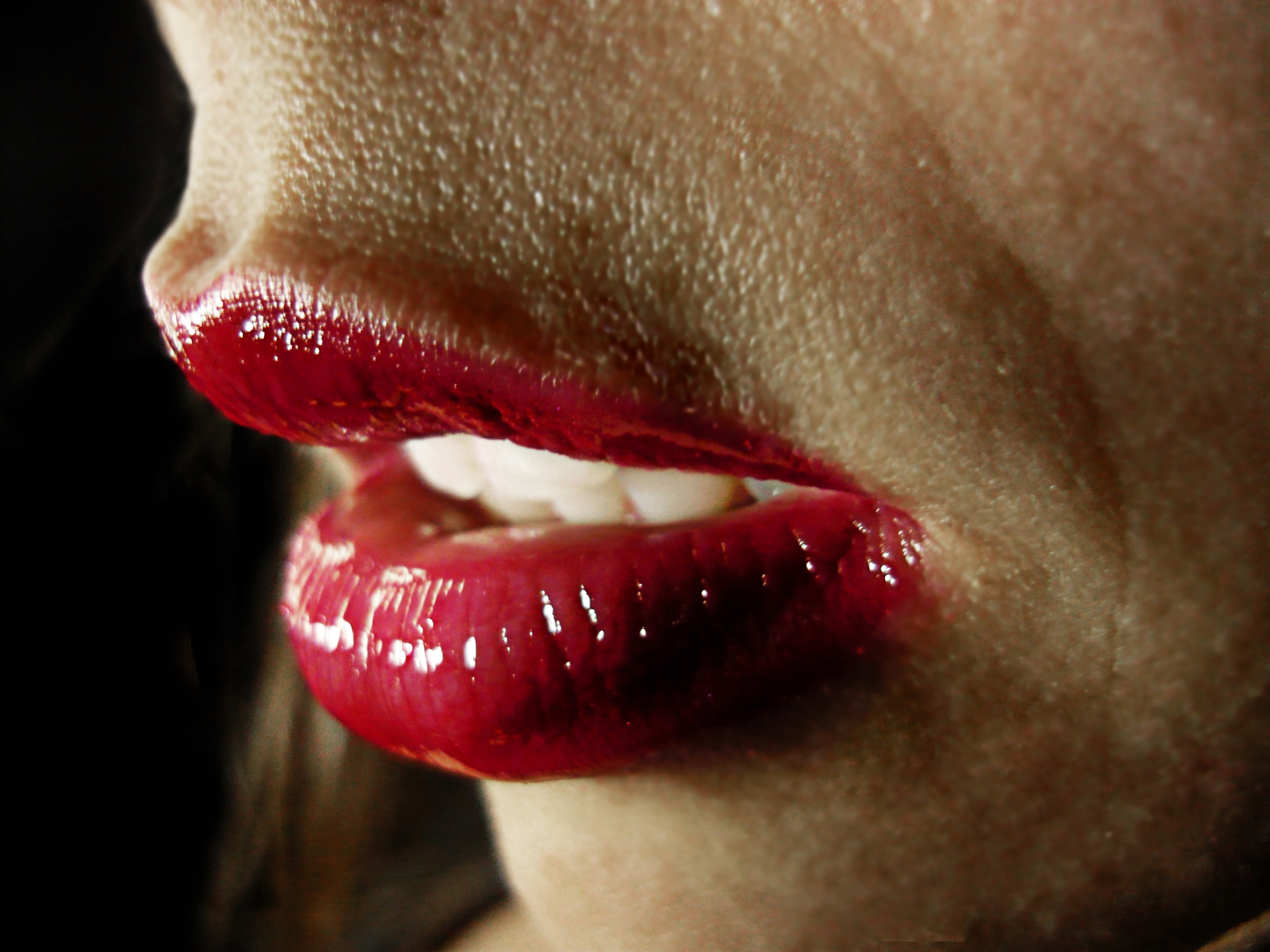
Lips of a young woman wearing red lipstick

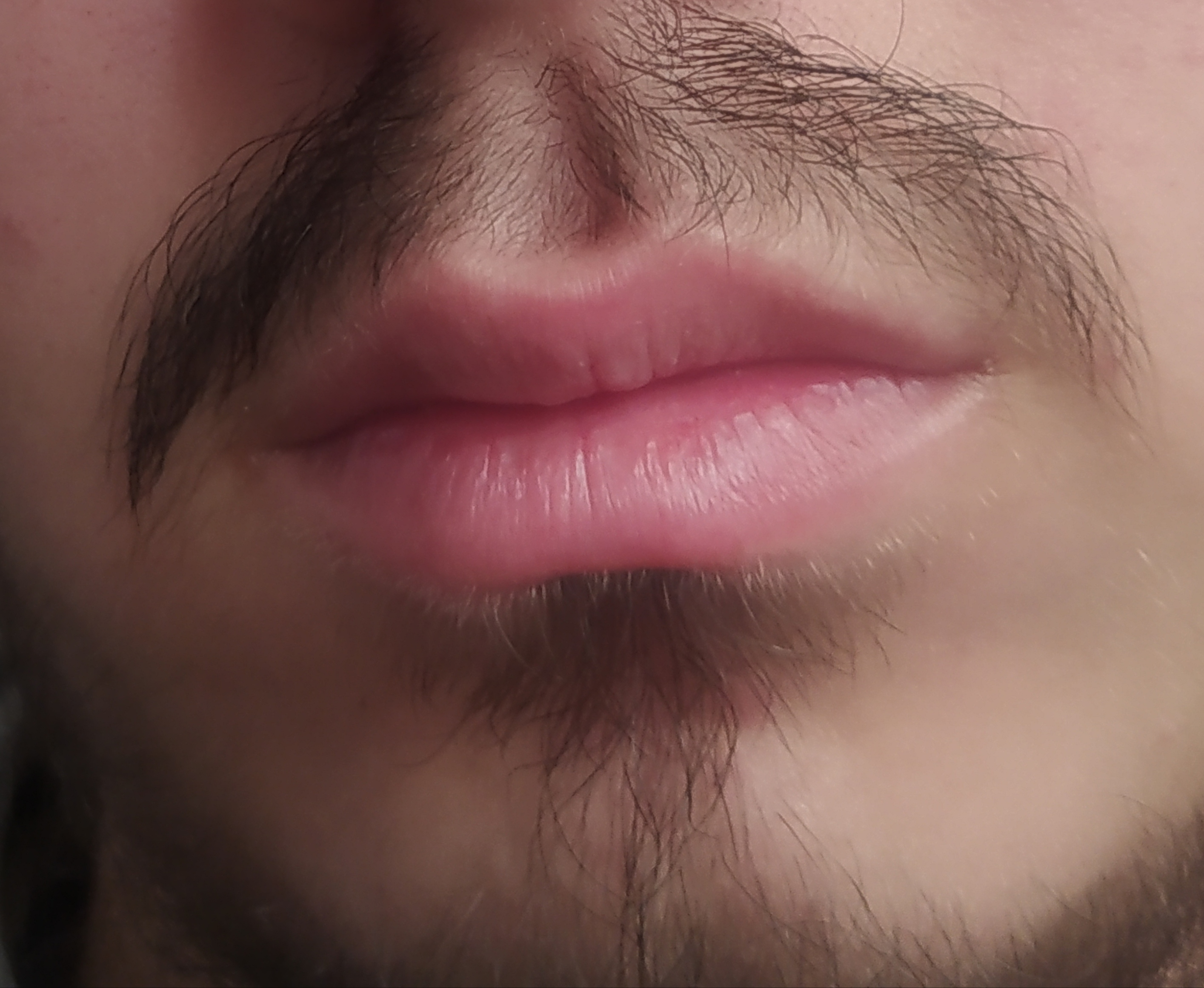
Lips of a young man

Because of their high number of nerve endings, the lips are an erogenous zone. The lips therefore play a crucial role in kissing and other acts of intimacy.

A woman's lips are also a visible expression of her fertility. In studies performed on the science of human attraction, psychologists have concluded that a woman's facial and sexual attractiveness is closely linked to the makeup of her hormones during puberty and development. Contrary to the effects of testosterone on a man's facial structure, the effects of a woman's estrogen levels serve to maintain a relatively "childlike" and youthful facial structure during puberty and during final maturation. It has been shown that the more estrogen a woman has, the larger her eyes and the fuller her lips, characteristics which are perceived as more feminine. Surveys performed by sexual psychologists have also found that universally, men find a woman's full lips to be more sexually attractive than lips that are less so. A woman's lips are therefore sexually attractive to males because they serve as a biological indicator of a woman's health and fertility. A woman's lipstick (or collagen lip enhancement) attempts to take advantage of this fact by creating the illusion that a woman has more estrogen than she actually has and thus that she is more fertile and attractive.

Lip size is linked to sexual attraction in both men and women. Women are attracted to men with masculine lips that are more middle size and not too big or too small; they are to be rugged and sensual. In general, the researchers found that a small nose, big eyes and voluptuous lips are sexually attractive both in men and women. The lips may temporarily swell during sexual arousal due to engorgement with blood.

=== Facial expression ===
The lips contribute substantially to facial expressions. The lips visibly express emotions such as a smile or frown, iconically by the curve of the lips forming an up-open or down-open arc, respectively. Lips can also be made pouty when whining or perky to be provocative.

Biting one's lip can also indicate several varying emotions, notably arousal and anxiety.

=== Open questions ===
The function of the abrupt change in skin structure between the lips and surrounding face (in particular, the function of the less keratinized vermillion and the white roll) is not completely understood. Possible reasons for the difference may include advantages to somatosensory function, better communication of facial expressions, and/or emphasis of the lips' slight sexual dimorphism as a secondary sex characteristic.

== Clinical significance ==
As an organ of the body, the lip can be a focus of disease or show symptoms of a disease:

- One of the most frequent changes of the lips is a blue coloring due to cyanosis; the blood contains less oxygen and thus has a dark red to blue color, which shows through the thin skin. Cyanosis is the reason why corpses sometimes have blue lips. In cold weather cyanosis can appear, so especially in the winter, blue lips may not be an uncommon sight.
- Inflammation of the lips is termed cheilitis. This can be in several forms such as chapped lips (dry, peeling lips), angular cheilitis (inflammation of the corners of the mouth), herpes labialis (cold sore, a form of herpes simplex) and actinic cheilitis (chronically sun damaged lips).

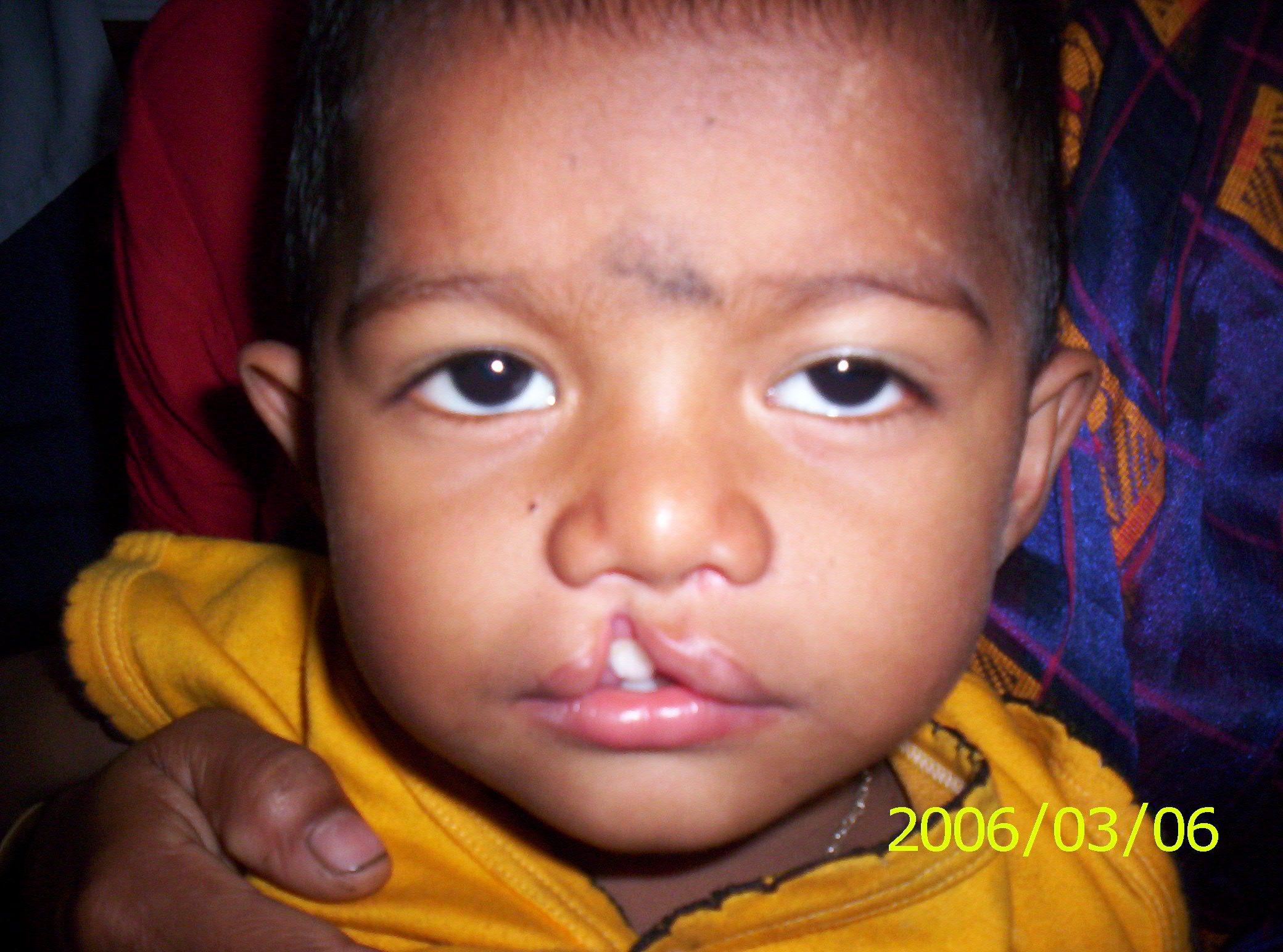
A child with cleft lip

- Cleft lip is a type of birth defect that can be successfully treated with surgery.
- Carcinoma (a malignant cancer that arises from epithelial cells) at the lips is caused predominantly by using tobacco and overexposure of sunlight. Alcohol appears to increase the carcinoma risk associated with tobacco use. It is most often a diffuse and often hyperkeratinised lesion, occasionally has the form of nodules and grows infiltratively, and can also be a combination of the two types. It more often occurs at the lower lip, where it is also much more malign. Lower lip carcinoma is exclusively planocellular carcinoma, whereas at the upper lip, it can also be basocellular carcinoma.

== Society and culture ==
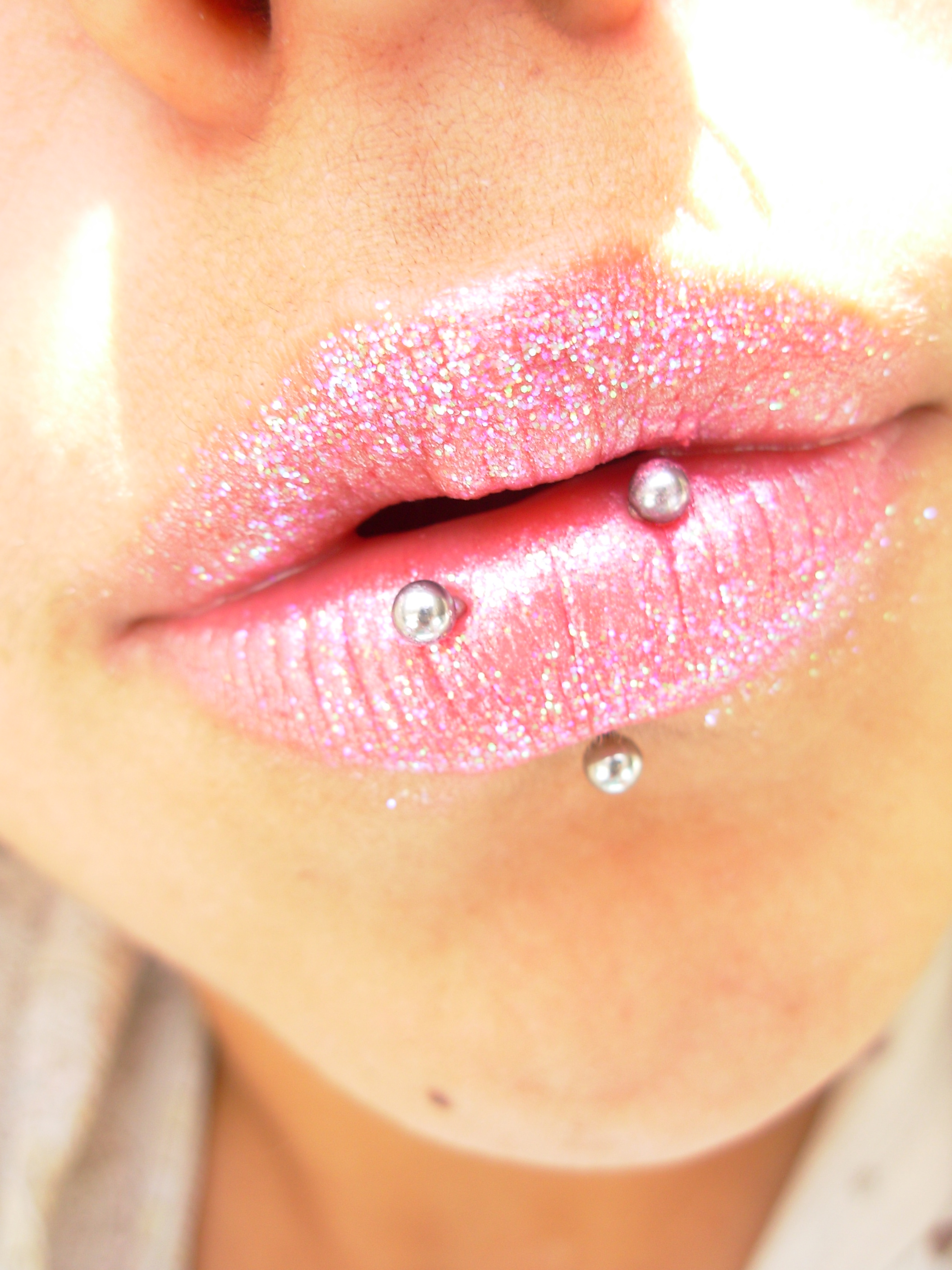
Pierced lips

Lips are often viewed as a symbol of sensuality and sexuality. This has many origins; above all, the lips are a very sensitive erogenous and tactile organ. Furthermore, in many cultures of the world, a woman's mouth and lips are veiled because of their representative association with the vulva, and because of their role as a woman's secondary sexual organ.

As part of the mouth, the lips are also associated with the symbolism associated with the mouth as orifice by which food is taken in. The lips are also linked symbolically to neonatal psychology (see for example oral stage of the psychology according to Sigmund Freud).

Lip piercing or lip augmentation is sometimes carried out for cosmetic reasons. Products designed for use on the lips include lipstick, lip gloss and lip balm.

== Other animals ==
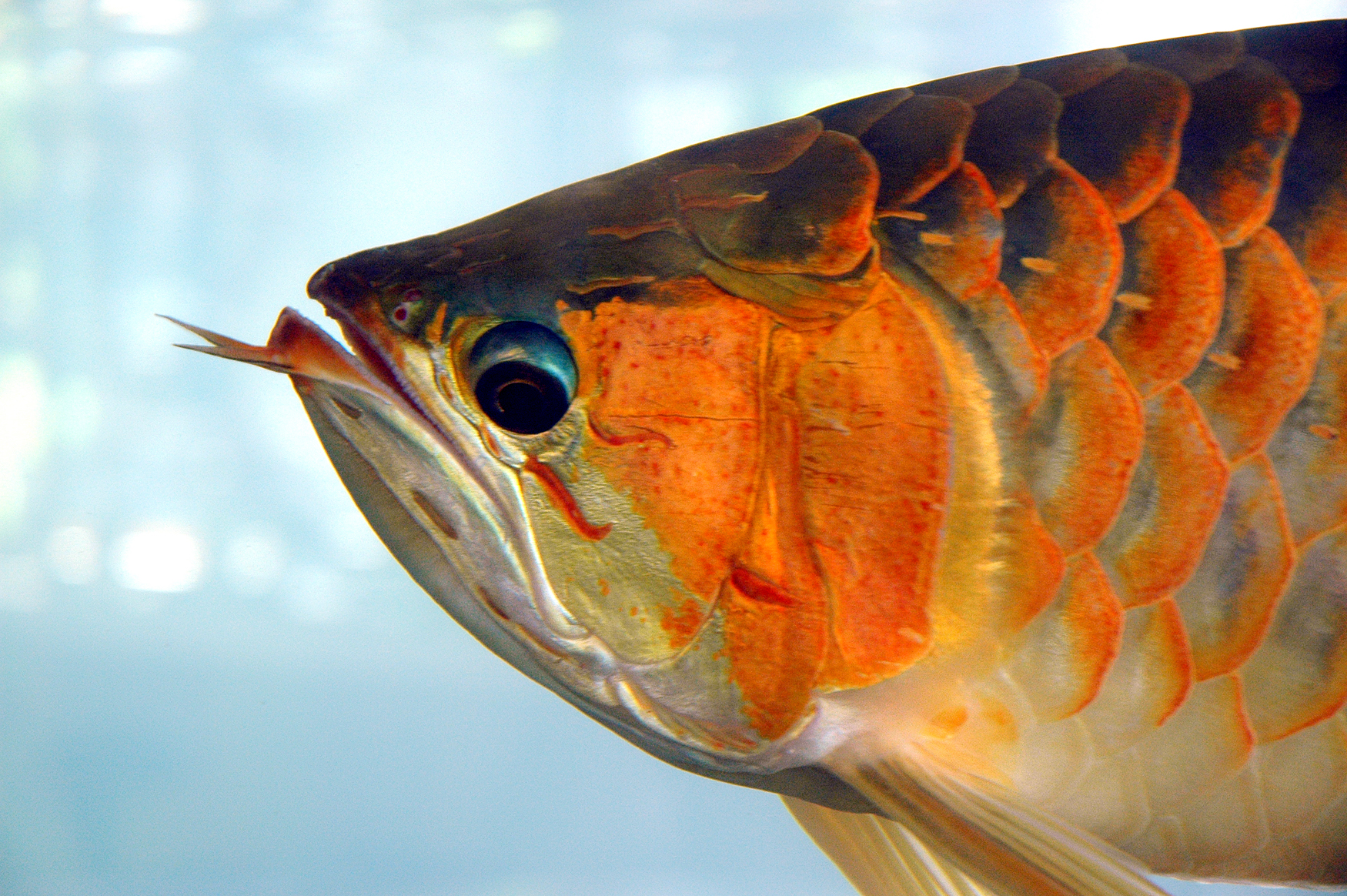
This Asian arowana has large, protruding barbels

In most vertebrates, the lips are relatively unimportant folds of tissue lying just outside the jaws. However, in mammals, they become much more prominent, being separated from the jaws by a deep cleft (a notable exception being the naked mole-rat, whose lips close behind the front teeth). They are also more mobile in mammals than in other groups since it is only in this group that they have any attached muscles. In some teleost fish, the lips may be modified to carry sensitive barbels. In birds and turtles, the lips are hard and keratinous, forming a solid beak. Clevosaurids like Clevosaurus are notable for the presence of bone "lips"; in these species the tooth-like jaw projections common to all sphenodontians form a beak-like edge around the jaws, protecting the teeth within.

== See also ==
- Stiff upper lip
