= Vermilion border =

Border between the lips and the rest of the face

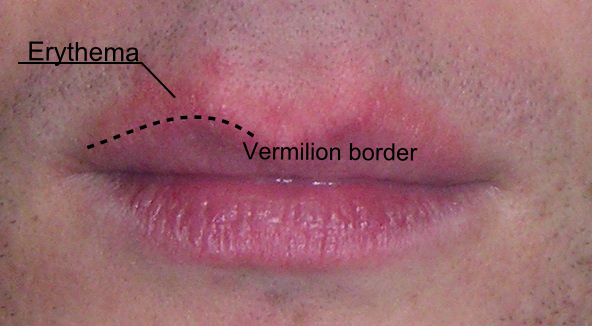
- Lips of a White human with the vermilion border outlined. A patch of erythema above the upper lip makes it more difficult to distinguish the vermilion border.

Details

Identifiers
- Latin: pars intermedia labiorum oris
- TH: H3.04.01.0.00010

The vermilion border (sometimes spelled vermillion border), also called margin or zone, is the normally sharp demarcation between the lip and the adjacent normal skin. It represents the change in the epidermis from highly keratinized external skin to less keratinized internal skin. It has no sebaceous glands, sweat glands, or facial hair.

It has a prominence on the face, creating a focus for cosmetics (it is where lipstick is sometimes applied) and is also a location for several skin diseases. Its functional properties, however, remain unknown.

== Structure ==
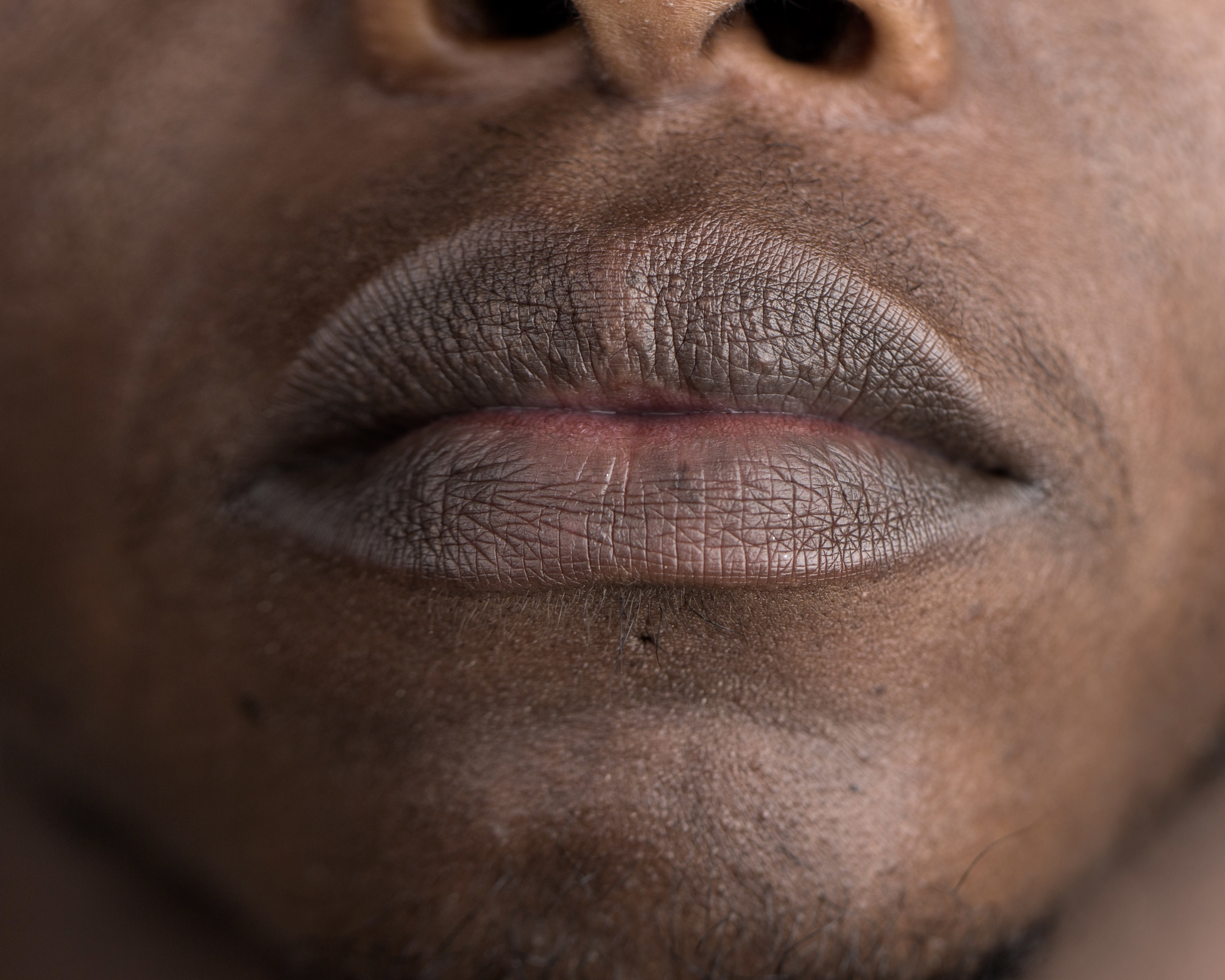
Lips of a black man, with the vermilion border mostly brown in colour, with pinkness in the inner part.

The lips are composed wholly of soft tissue. The skin of the face is thicker than the skin overlying the lips where blood vessels are closer to the surface. As a consequence, the margin of the lips shows a transition between the thicker and thinner skin, represented by the vermilion border. It therefore has the appearance of a sharp line between the coloured edge of the lip and adjoining skin.

It has been described as a pale, white rolled border and also as being a red line. Among dark-skinned people, the vermilion border may be brown instead of red-pink in colour.

This fine line of pale skin accentuates the colour difference between the vermilion and normal skin. Along the upper lip, two adjacent elevations of the vermilion border form the Cupid's bow.

=== Microanatomy ===
The vermilion border represents the change in the epidermis from highly keratinized external skin to less keratinized internal skin. It has no sebaceous glands, sweat glands, or facial hair.

There are two reasons that the border appears red in some people:

1. The epithelium is thin and therefore the blood vessels are closer to the surface.
2. This epithelium contains eleidin which is transparent and the blood vessels are near the surface of the papillary layer, revealing the "red blood cell" color. At the angles of the mouth, there are sebaceous glands, without hair follicles, which are called Fordyce spots.

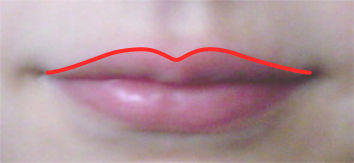
A Cupid's bow on the upper lip.

== Clinical significance ==
The vermilion border is important in dentistry and oral pathology as a marker to detect disease, such as in actinic cheilitis.

=== Associated diseases ===
- Perioral dermatitis is a rash typically around the mouth, that spares the vermilion border.
- Cheilitis glandularis may present with a burning sensation over the vermilion border. This chronic progressive condition is associated with thinning of the skin of the lips and ulceration.
- Infections may involve the vermilion border. Cold sores are one common infection. Impetigo is another.
- Skin cancer can also occur at the vermilion border.
- Fetal alcohol syndrome causes facial abnormalities which include a thin vermilion border with a smooth philtrum.

=== Cosmetic appearance ===
- Sunlight exposure can blur the junction between the vermilion border and the skin. Applying lip balm and sunscreen moisturizer protects it from sunlight.

=== Surgery ===
A vermilionectomy (sometimes spelled vermillionectomy) is the surgical removal of the vermilion border. It is sometimes performed to treat carcinoma of the lip.

Close attention is given when repairing any injury to the vermilion border. Even 1 mm of vermilion misalignment could be noticeable.

== See also ==
- List of specialized glands within the human integumentary system
- White roll
