= Louis Queyrat =

French dermatologist and syphilologist

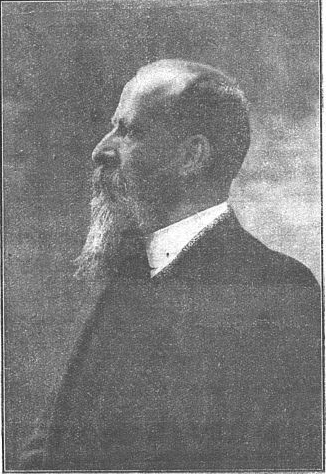
Louis Queyrat in 1931

Vincent Jules Louis Queyrat (2 December 1856 in Chavanat, Creuse, France – 18 October 1933 in Paris, France) was a French dermatologist and syphilologist who is best remembered for the erythroplasia of Queyrat, a carcinoma in situ of the skin of the penis. From 1898 until 1923, Queyrat was head of the dermatology service of l'Hôpital Ricord, a venereal hospital in Paris, now Hôpital Cochin.

== Works ==
- Louis Queyrat (2018), Le patois de la région de Chavanat. Grammaire et folklore (PDF), Paris, France: IEO París
