= Inferior labial vein =

Facial vein

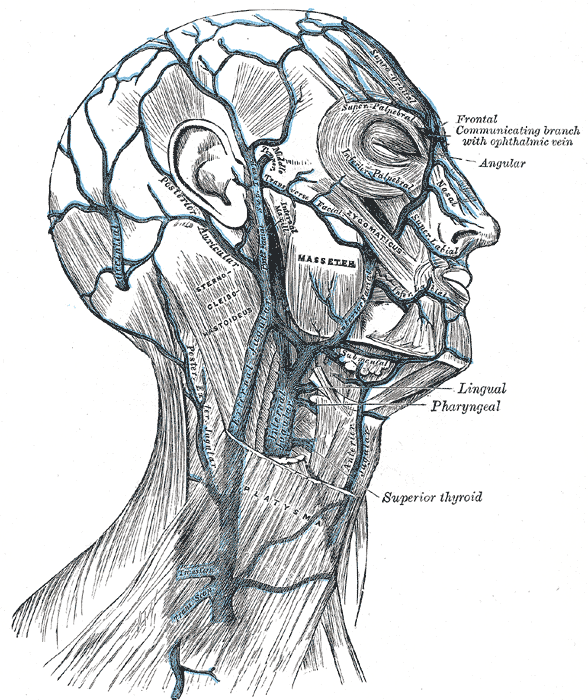
- Veins of the head and neck. (Inferior labial vein visible at center right.)

Details
- Drains from: Lower lip
- Drains to: Facial vein
- Artery: Inferior labial

Identifiers
- Latin: venae labiales inferiores
- TA98: A12.3.05.026
- TA2: 4825
- FMA: 70848

The inferior labial vein is the vein receiving blood from the lower lip.

== Additional images ==
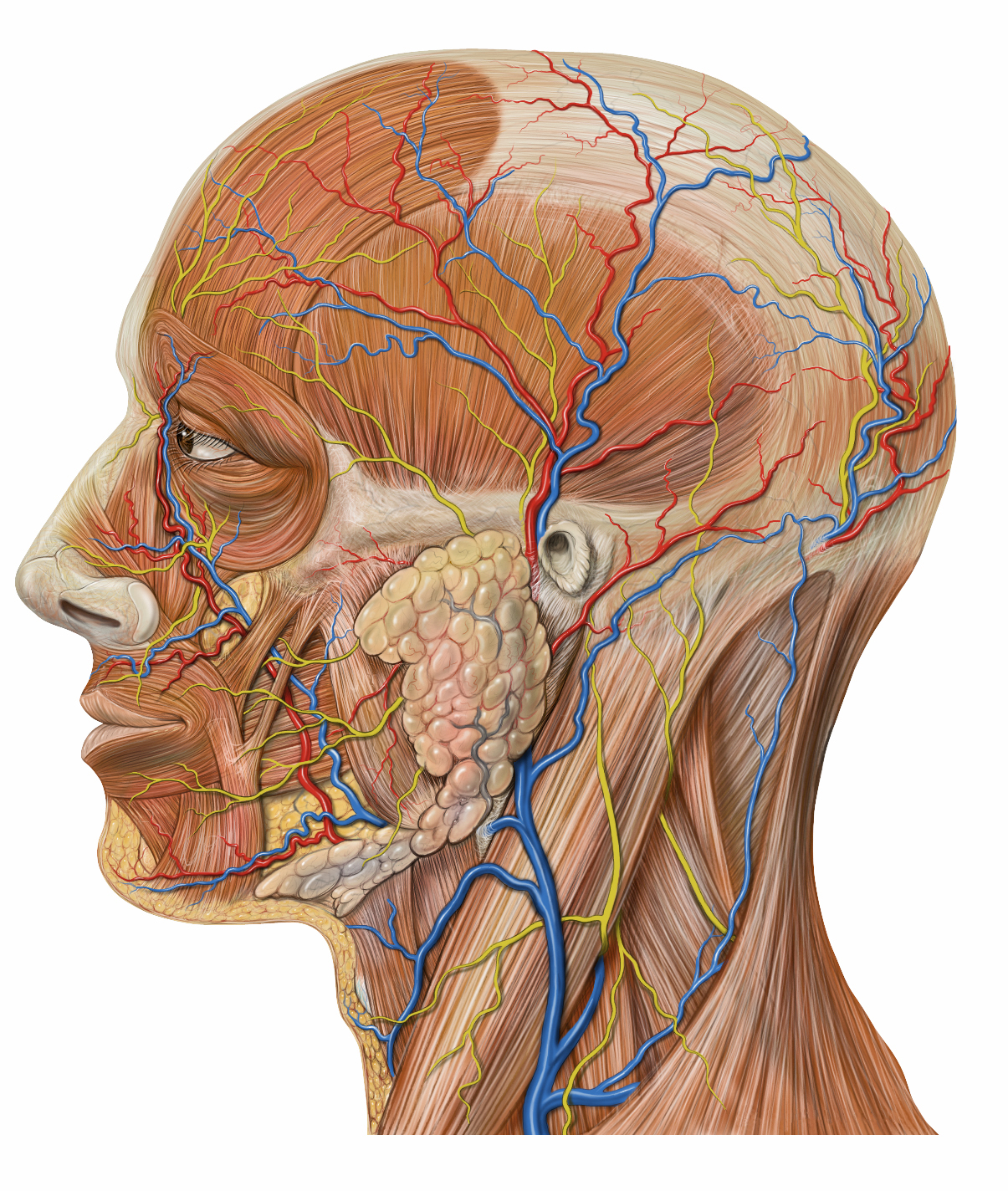
Lateral head anatomy detail

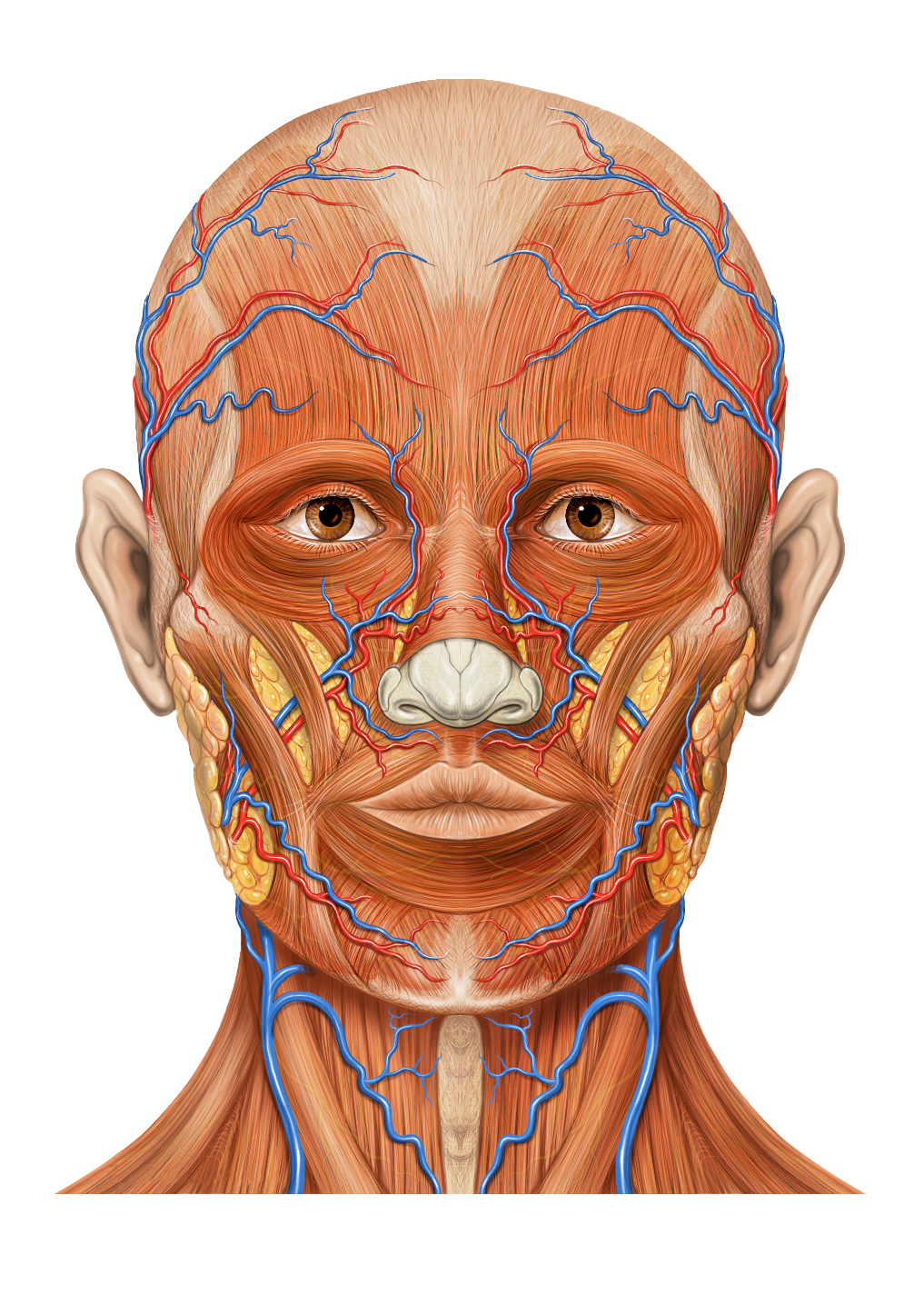
Head anatomy anterior view
