= Cupid's bow =

Double curve of the human upper lip

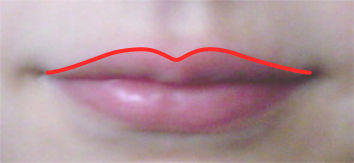
Cupid's bow feature on the superior human lip

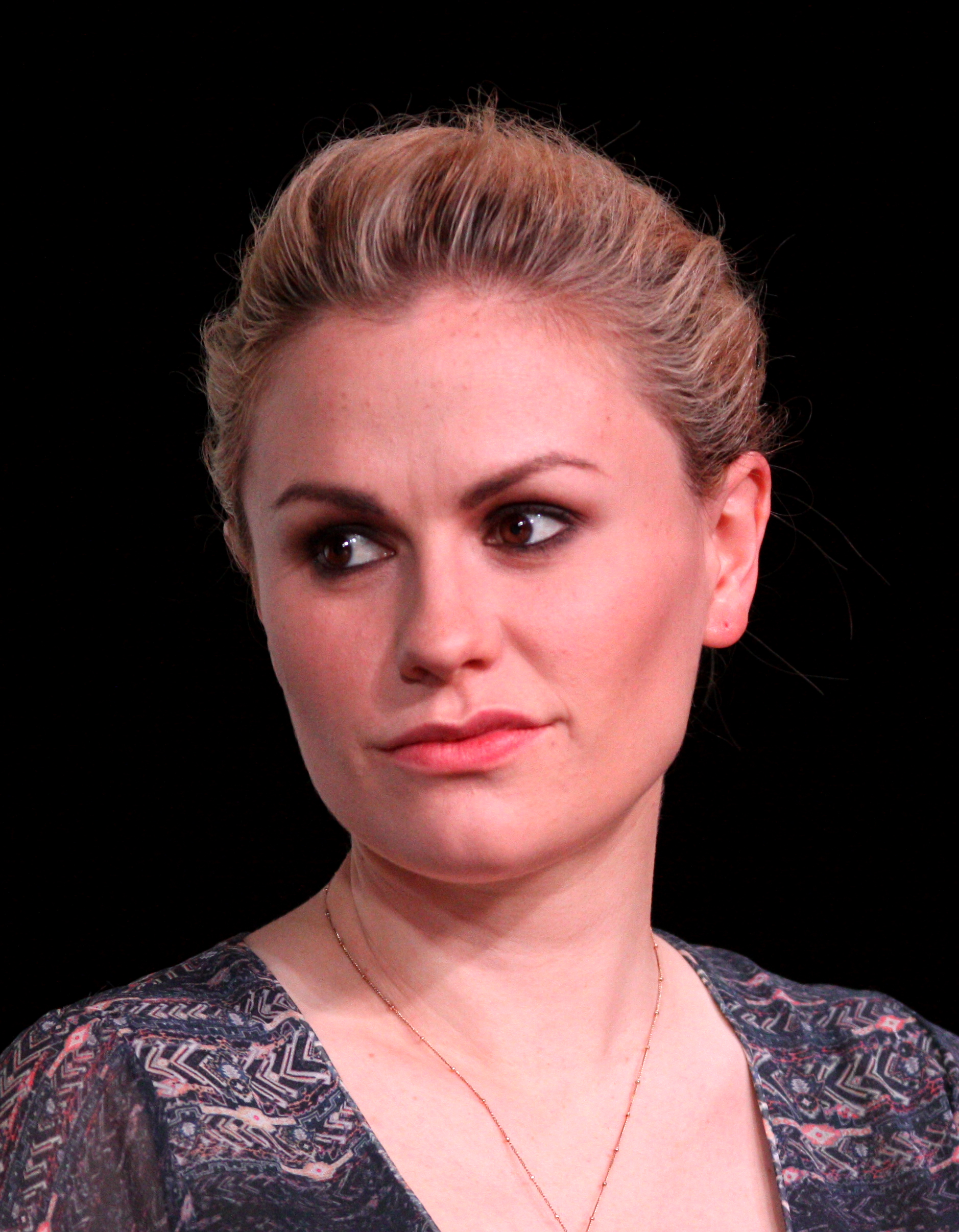
Actress Anna Paquin has a prominent Cupid's bow

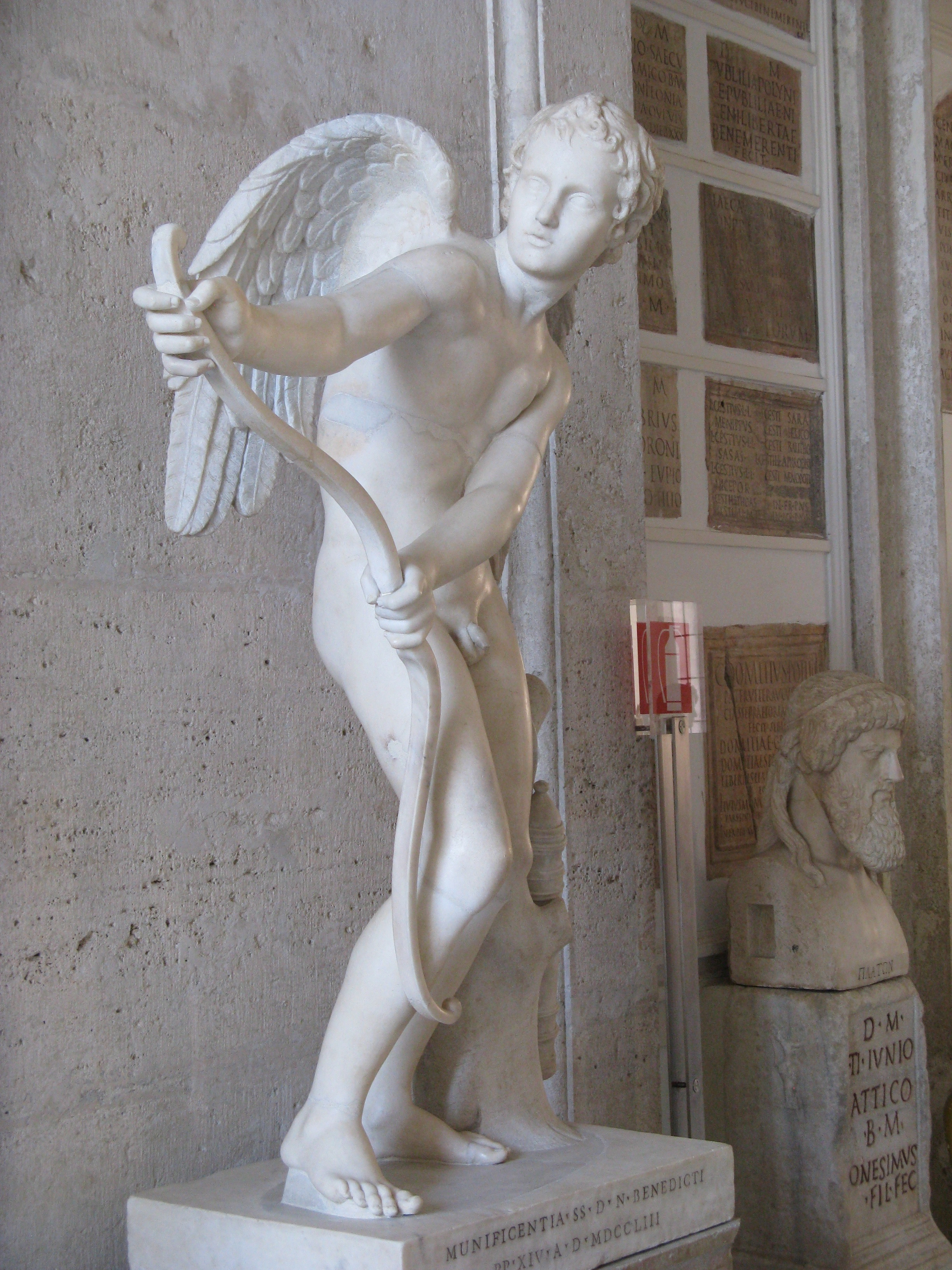
Eros bending his bow, Lysippos, 2nd century AD

The Cupid's bow is a facial feature where the double curve of a human upper lip is said to resemble a recurve bow of the sort used in ancient Greece or Rome. The name is taken from Cupid, the bow-wielding Roman god of erotic love equivalent to the Greek Eros. The peaks of the bow coincide with the philtral columns giving a prominent bow appearance to the lip. It is outlined with the vermilion border, which connects the lip skin to the facial skin.

Celebrities with a pronounced Cupid's bow include Taylor Swift, Anna Paquin and Rihanna.

== See also ==
- Philtrum
- White roll
