= List of depressors of the human body =

Depression is an anatomical term of motion describing movement in an inferior direction (moving away from the head towards the feet. It is the opposite of elevation.

== Muscles ==
=== Shoulders ===
- Latissimus dorsi muscle
- Pectoralis minor muscle
- Trapezius muscle
- Serratus anterior muscle
- Subclavius muscle

=== Mouth ===
- hyoid / larynx
  - Infrahyoid muscles
    - sternothyroid
    - sternohyoid
    - thyrohyoid
    - omohyoid
- mandible
  - Lateral pterygoid muscle
- lower lip
  - Depressor labii inferioris muscle
- angle of mouth
  - Depressor anguli oris muscle
- nasal septum
  - Depressor septi nasi muscle

=== Eyes ===
- eyeball
  - Inferior rectus muscle
  - Superior oblique muscle

=== Other ===
- eyebrow
  - Depressor supercilii muscle
- diaphragm
