= Glandular branches of the thyroid artery =

Glandular branches of the thyroid artery may refer to:

- Glandular branches of the superior thyroid artery
- Glandular branches of the inferior thyroid artery
