= Infrahyoid muscles =

Group of muscles

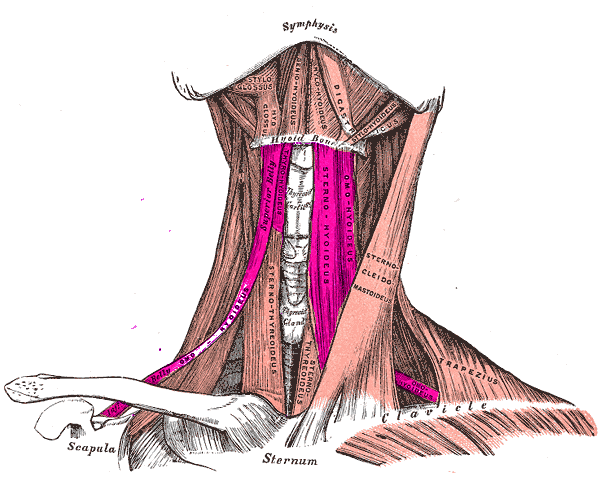
- Muscles of the neck seen from the front. The infrahyoid muscles are coloured in violet.

Details
- Nerve: Ansa cervicalis (except thyrohyoid muscle)
- Actions: Depress the hyoid bone

Identifiers
- Latin: musculi infrahyoidei
- TA98: A04.2.04.001
- TA2: 2167
- FMA: 71298

The infrahyoid muscles, or strap muscles, are a group of four pairs of muscles in the anterior (frontal) part of the neck. The four infrahyoid muscles are the sternohyoid, sternothyroid, thyrohyoid and omohyoid muscles.

Excluding the sternothyroid, the infrahyoid muscles either originate from or insert on to the hyoid bone.

The term infrahyoid refers to the region below the hyoid bone, while the term strap muscles refers to the long, and flat muscle shapes which resembles a strap. The stylopharyngeus muscle is considered by many to be one of the strap muscles, but is not an infrahyoid muscle.

== Individual muscles ==
The origin, insertion and innervation of the individual muscles:

Muscle	Origin	Insertion	Innervation
Sternohyoid	Posterior surface of manubrium sterni, adjoining parts of clavicle and the posterior sternoclavicular ligament	Medial part of lower border of hyoid bone	Ansa cervicalis
Sternothyroid	Posterior surface of manubrium sterni and adjoining part of first costal cartilage	Oblique line of thyroid cartilage	Ansa cervicalis
Thyrohyoid	Oblique line of the thyroid cartilage	Lower border of the body and the greater cornu of the hyoid bone	Cervical spinal nerve 1 via the hypoglossal nerve
Omohyoid (superior belly)	Intermediate tendon	Hyoid bone	Superior root of ansa cervicalis (C1)
Omohyoid (inferior belly)	Superior border of scapula	Intermediate tendon	Ansa cervicalis (C1-C3)

=== Nerve supply ===
All of the infrahyoid muscles are innervated by the ansa cervicalis from the cervical plexus (C1-C3) except the thyrohyoid muscle, which is innervated by fibers only from the first cervical spinal nerve travelling with the hypoglossal nerve.

== Function ==
The infrahyoid muscles function to elevate and depress the hyoid bone and larynx during swallowing and speech. This moves the larynx as one unit.

== See also ==
- Muscular triangle
- Suprahyoid muscles
