= Omohyoid muscle syndrome =

Rare condition affecting the neck

Omohyoid muscle syndrome (OMS) is a rare condition that presents as a characteristic X-shaped lateral neck protrusion that occurs on swallowing. It is caused by the omohyoid muscle displacing the overlying sternocleidomastoid muscle. Most cases are of insidious onset and painless, and have no antecedent trauma. The condition has been documented as early as 1969.

== Presentation ==
Omohyoid muscle syndrome typically presents with a painless, bulging neck mass that appears only during swallowing. Patients may report a sense of discomfort, mild dysphagia, or a foreign body sensation in the throat. No voice changes or systemic symptoms are typically present.

== Mechanism ==
The underlying pathogenic mechanism remains uncertain. However, loosening of the intermediate tendon sheath and disuse atrophy cause the omohyoid muscle to shorten and become fibrotic. During swallowing, the shortened muscle pulls the sternocleidomastoid muscle upward, forming an X-shaped tent and producing a transient lateral neck mass.

== Epidemiology ==
The majority of reported cases originate from Eastern Asia. In a systematic review of 20 cases, all Asian, the mean age of presentation was 36 years, with a 7:3 male-to-female ratio. Most patients were asymptomatic aside from the visible neck protrusion, and the majority of cases had no identifiable triggering event. Trauma preceded symptom onset in 20% of the cases.

== Diagnosis ==
High-frequency ultrasound is the preferred imaging modality for diagnosing omohyoid muscle syndrome. It can demonstrate excessive movement of the omohyoid muscle during swallowing. Radiographs may reveal tracheal deviation, while computed tomography can show anterolateral displacement and tenting of the sternocleidomastoid muscle.

== Treatment ==
Management options include cosmetic surgery and botulinum toxin injection. The condition is typically painless and often requires no intervention. Surgical approaches, such as open, endoscopic, or laparoscopic transection of the omohyoid muscle, have been reported. In one case series of five patients, laparoscopic transection via subplatysmal access resulted in no complications, no visible scarring, and no recurrence at 1-year follow-up. Botulinum toxin injection may temporarily relax the muscle but is less definitive and recurrence is possible. Surgery is generally reserved for patients with significant cosmetic concerns.
