= Neck =

Body part that connects the head and torso

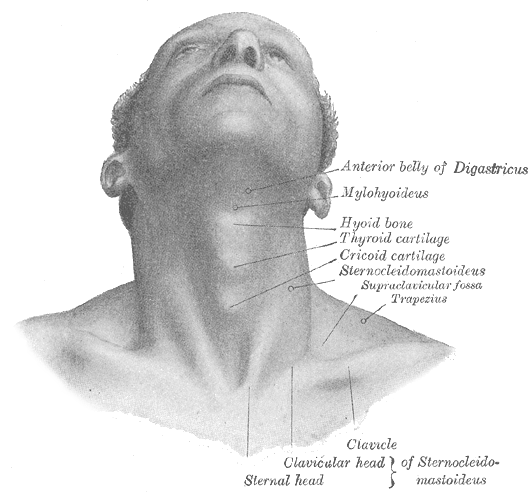
- Lateral view of the male human neck, with components labelled

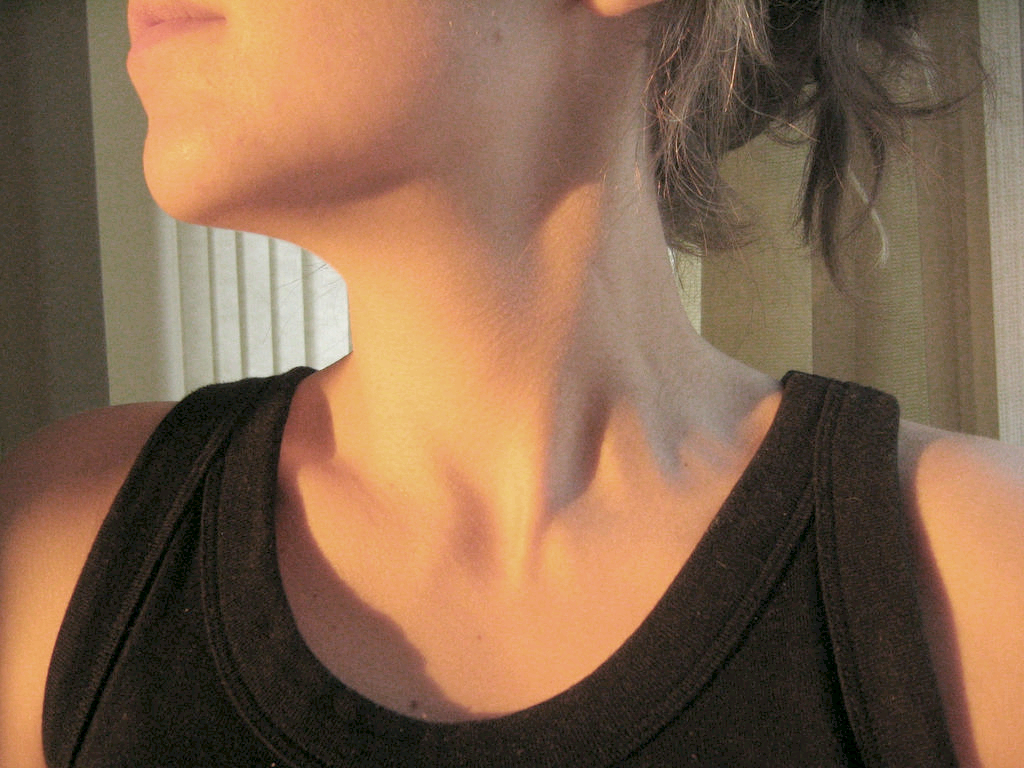
- Human neck (female)

Details

Identifiers
- Latin: cervix; collum
- MeSH: D009333
- TA98: A01.1.00.012
- TA2: 123
- FMA: 7155

The neck is the part of the body in many vertebrates that connects the head to the torso. It supports the weight of the head and protects the nerves that transmit sensory and motor information between the brain and the rest of the body. Additionally, the neck is highly flexible, allowing the head to turn and move in all directions. Anatomically, the human neck is divided into four compartments: vertebral, visceral, and two vascular compartments. Within these compartments, the neck houses the cervical vertebrae, the cervical portion of the spinal cord, upper parts of the respiratory and digestive tracts, endocrine glands, nerves, arteries⁣⁣ and veins. The muscles of the neck, which are separate from the compartments, form the boundaries of the neck triangles.

In anatomy, the neck is also referred to as the cervix or collum. However, when the term cervix is used alone, it often refers to the uterine cervix, the neck of the ⁣⁣uterus⁣⁣. Therefore, the adjective cervical can refer either to the neck (as in cervical vertebrae or cervical lymph nodes) or to the uterine cervix (as in cervical cap or cervical cancer).

== Structure ==
Muscles in the human neck

=== Compartments ===
The neck structures are distributed within four compartments:

- Vertebral compartment contains the cervical vertebrae with cartilaginous discs between each vertebral body. The alignment of the vertebrae defines the shape of the human neck. As the vertebrae bound the spinal canal, the cervical portion of the spinal cord is also found within the neck.
- Visceral compartment accommodates the trachea, larynx, pharynx, thyroid, and parathyroid glands.
- Vascular compartment is paired and consists of the two carotid sheaths found on each side of the trachea. Each carotid sheath contains the vagus nerve, common carotid artery and internal jugular vein.

Besides the listed structures, the neck contains cervical lymph nodes which surround the blood vessels.

=== Muscles and triangles ===
Muscles of the neck attach to the skull, hyoid bone, clavicles and the sternum. They bound the two major neck triangles; anterior and posterior.

Anterior triangle is defined by the anterior border of the sternocleidomastoid muscle, inferior edge of the mandible and the midline of the neck. It contains the stylohyoid, digastric, mylohyoid, geniohyoid, omohyoid, sternohyoid, thyrohyoid and sternothyroid muscles. These muscles are grouped as the suprahyoid and infrahyoid muscles depending on if they are located superiorly or inferiorly to the hyoid bone. The suprahyoid muscles (stylohyoid, digastric, mylohyoid, geniohyoid) elevate the hyoid bone, while the infrahyoid muscles (omohyoid, sternohyoid, thyrohyoid, sternothyroid) depress it. Acting synchronously, both groups facilitate speech and swallowing.

Posterior triangle is bordered by the posterior border of the sternocleidomastoid muscle, anterior border of the trapezius muscle and the superior edge of the middle third of the clavicle. This triangle contains the sternocleidomastoid, trapezius, splenius capitis, levator scapulae, omohyoid, anterior, middle and posterior scalene muscles.

=== Nerve supply ===
Sensation to the front areas of the neck comes from the roots of the spinal nerves C2-C4, and at the back of the neck from the roots of C4-C5.

In addition to nerves coming from and within the human spine, the accessory nerve and vagus nerve travel down the neck.

=== Blood supply and major vessels ===
The major blood vessels traveling through the neck provide the primary conduit for supplying oxygenated blood to and draining venous blood from the head.
The main arteries supplying oxygenated blood to the head and neck are the external carotid arteries, the internal carotid arteries, the vertebral arteries and the thyrocervical trunks.
The carotid and vertebral arteries mostly supply the head, whilst the many small blood vessels of the thyrocervical trunk vascularise the structures of the neck. The subclavian artery gives rise to the vertebral arteries and thyrocervical trunks, which provide blood to the cerebrum, the cerebellum, posterior neck, upper limbs and the superior and anterior chest wall. The thyrocervical trunk mainly vascularizes anterior neck structures, the thyroid gland, and regional muscles.

The external carotid arteries (ECA) rise from the common carotid artery, as one of two main branches, which stem from the aortic arch on the left side and from the brachiocephalic trunk on the right side.
The carotid bifurcation occurs at the level of the thyroid cartilage in the larynx. The external carotid artery is the only division of the common carotid that gives branches to the neck region and supplies the superficial structures of the head and face.
The external carotid artery has eight branches: the superior thyroid, ascending pharyngeal, lingual, facial, occipital, posterior auricular, maxillary and superficial temporal arteries, the last two being the terminal branches of the external carotid.

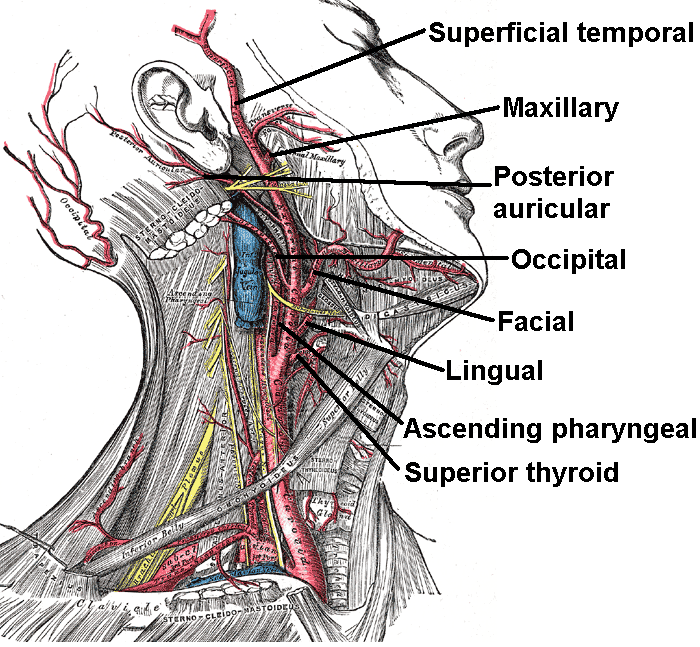
The eight branches of the external carotid artery, labelled

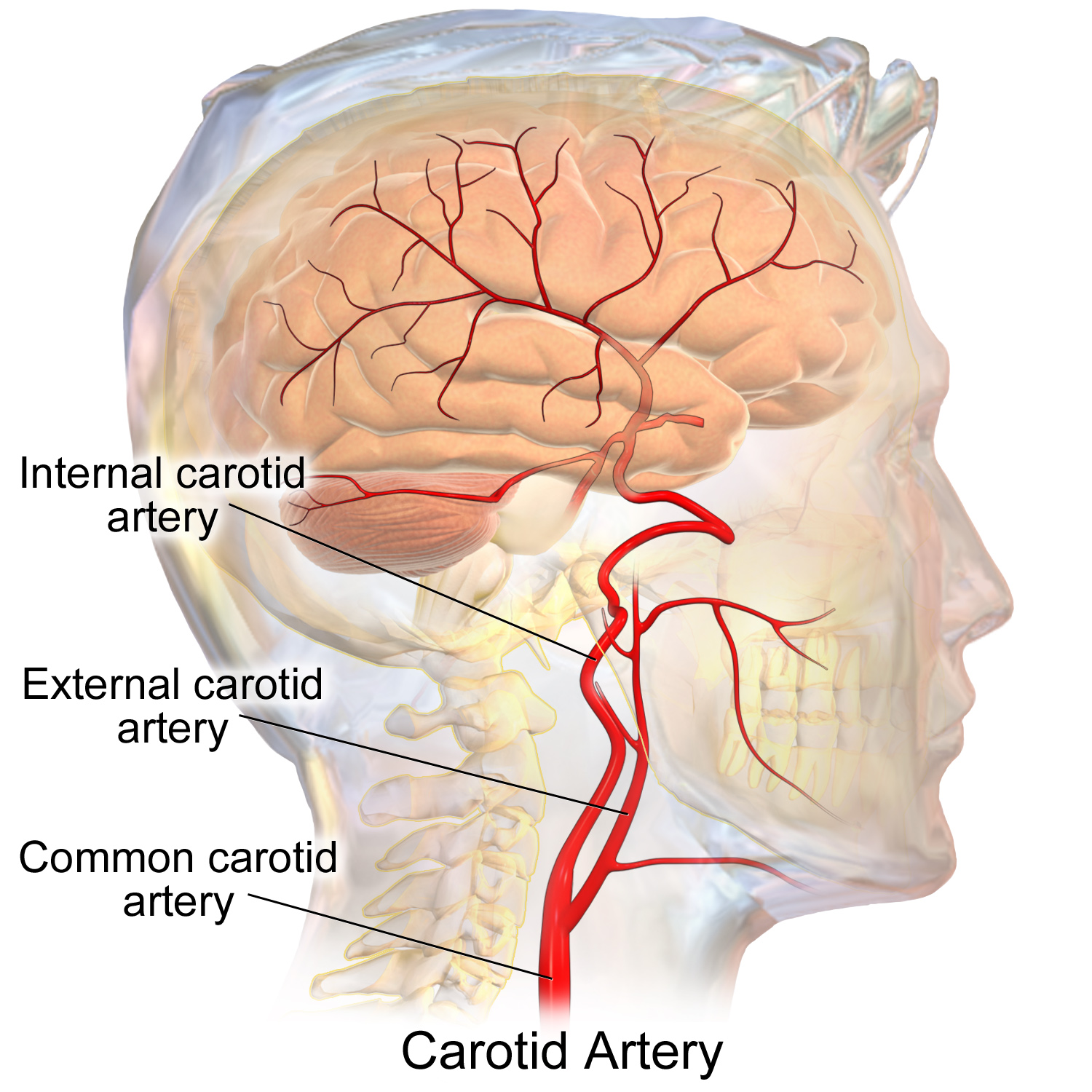
The common carotid artery and its branches, vascularising the head and face

The internal carotid artery is the second branch of the common carotid artery, supplying blood primarily to the anterior part of the brain, the eye and its appendages, and branches to the forehead and nose. It begins at the bifurcation of the common carotid artery (typically at the upper border of the thyroid cartilage, around cervical vertebrae C3–C4 level) and ascends to the base of the skull. The internal carotid artery’s course can be divided into four regions:

I. Cervical Portion (Pars cervicalis); Course: Extends from the common carotid bifurcation up to the entrance of the carotid canal in the petrous portion of the temporal bone.
Relations: Lies within the carotid sheath along with the internal jugular vein and the vagus nerve. The cervical portion gives off no branches.

II.Petrous Portion (Pars petrosa);

Course: Enters the carotid canal in the temporal bone, ascending slightly before curving anteriorly and medially. It exits the canal near the foramen lacerum to enter the cranial cavity.
Branches: Caroticotympanic branch: A small vessel entering the tympanic cavity.
Pterygoid canal branch (Vidian artery): An occasional small branch passing through the pterygoid canal.

III. Cavernous Portion (Pars cavernosa);
Course: Passes forward within the cavernous sinus along the side of the sphenoid bone body, forming a distinct S-shaped curve (often referred to as the carotid siphon).
Branches: Cavernous branches: Tiny twigs supplying the trigeminal ganglion and the walls of the sinus.
Hypophyseal branches: Small vessels supplying the pituitary gland (hypophysis).
Anterior meningeal branch: Supplies the dura mater of the anterior cranial fossa.

IV. Cerebral Portion (Pars cerebralis);

Course: Emerges from the cavernous sinus on the medial side of the anterior clinoid process, passes between the optic and oculomotor nerves, and enters the subarachnoid space at the base of the brain.
Major Branches:
Ophthalmic Artery: Arises as the vessel pierces the dura mater, entering the orbit through the optic foramen.
Posterior Communicating Artery: Runs backward to anastomose with the posterior cerebral artery (forming part of the Circle of Willis).
Anterior Choroidal Artery: Supplies the choroid plexus of the lateral ventricle and surrounding structures.
Anterior Cerebral Artery & Middle Cerebral Artery: The main terminal branches supplying the cerebral hemispheres.

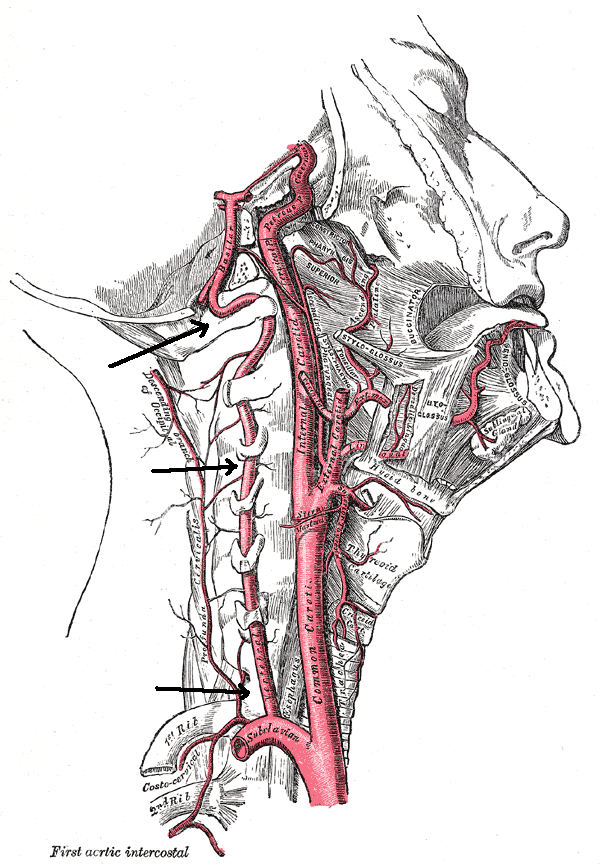
The arteries of the neck, the vertebral arising from the subclavian arteries and joining to form the basilar artery

The vertebral arteries are major blood vessels originating from the subclavian artery. Alongside the basilar artery (as a primary branch), the two vertebral arteries form the vertebrobasilar vascular system, supplying blood to the central nervous system; the upper spinal cord, brainstem, cerebellum, and posterior part of the brain. The branches of the vertebral artery are: the basilar artery, posterior spinal artery, anterior spinal artery, and the posterior inferior cerebellar artery.

The vertebral artery may be divided into four parts:

- The first (preforaminal) part runs upward and backward between the anterior scalene and the longus colli muscles (angle of Nunziante Ippolito). In front of it are the internal jugular and vertebral veins, and is crossed by the inferior thyroid artery; the left vertebral is also crossed by the thoracic duct. Behind it are the transverse process of the seventh cervical vertebra, the sympathetic trunk and its inferior cervical ganglion.
- The second (foraminal) part runs upward through the transverse foramina of the C6 to C2 vertebrae, and is surrounded by branches from the inferior cervical sympathetic ganglion and by a plexus of veins which unite to form the vertebral vein at the lower part of the neck. It is situated in front of the trunks of the cervical nerves, and pursues an almost vertical course as far as the transverse process of the axis.
- The third (extradural or atlantic) part issues from the C2 foramen transversarium on the medial side of the Rectus capitis lateralis. It is further subdivided into the vertical part V3v passing vertically upwards, crossing the C2 root and entering the foramen transversarium of C1, and the horizontal part V3h, curving medially and posteriorly behind the superior articular process of the atlas, the anterior ramus of the first cervical nerve being on its medial side; it then lies in the groove on the upper surface of the posterior arch of the atlas, and enters the vertebral canal by passing beneath the posterior atlantoöccipital membrane. This part of the artery is covered by the Semispinalis capitis and is contained in the suboccipital triangle, a triangular space bounded by the Rectus capitis posterior major, the Obliquus superior, and the Obliquus inferior. The first cervical or suboccipital nerve lies between the artery and the posterior arch of the atlas.
- The fourth (intradural or intracranial) part pierces the dura mater and inclines medially to the front of the medulla oblongata; it is placed between the hypoglossal nerve and the anterior root of the first cervical nerve and beneath the first digitation of the ligamentum denticulatum. In the midline at the medullopontine sulcus, it merges with the vessel of the opposite side to form the basilar artery.

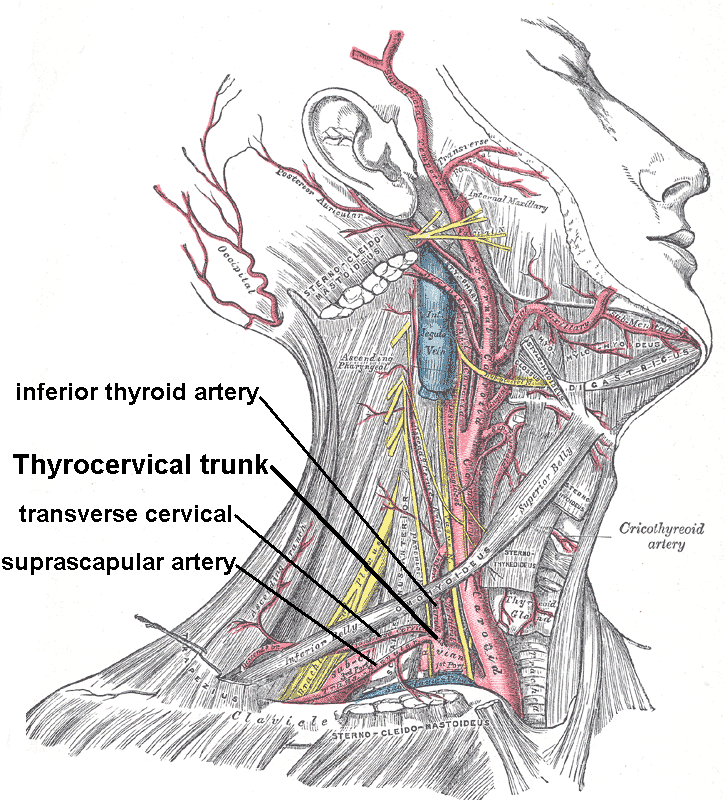
Superficial dissection of the neck showing the vertebral, carotid and subclavian arteries, the thyrocervical trunk and it’s branches labelled

The thyrocervical trunks are a series of small arteries of the neck arising from the subclavian arteries, lateral to the vertebral arteries. The trunk further branches into the inferior thyroid artery, suprascapular artery, and the transverse cervical artery, feeding the anterior neck structures, regional and scapular muscles, and the thyroid gland.

The transverse cervical artery is present in about 2/3 of cases. In a third of cases the superficial cervical artery and the dorsal scapular artery arise as the transverse cervical artery.
The suprascapular artery and transverse cervical artery both head laterally and cross in front of (anterior to) the anterior scalene muscle and the phrenic nerve. The inferior thyroid artery runs superiorly from the thyrocervical trunk to the inferior portion of the thyroid gland. There is significant variation in the origin of these vessels.

=== Surface anatomy ===
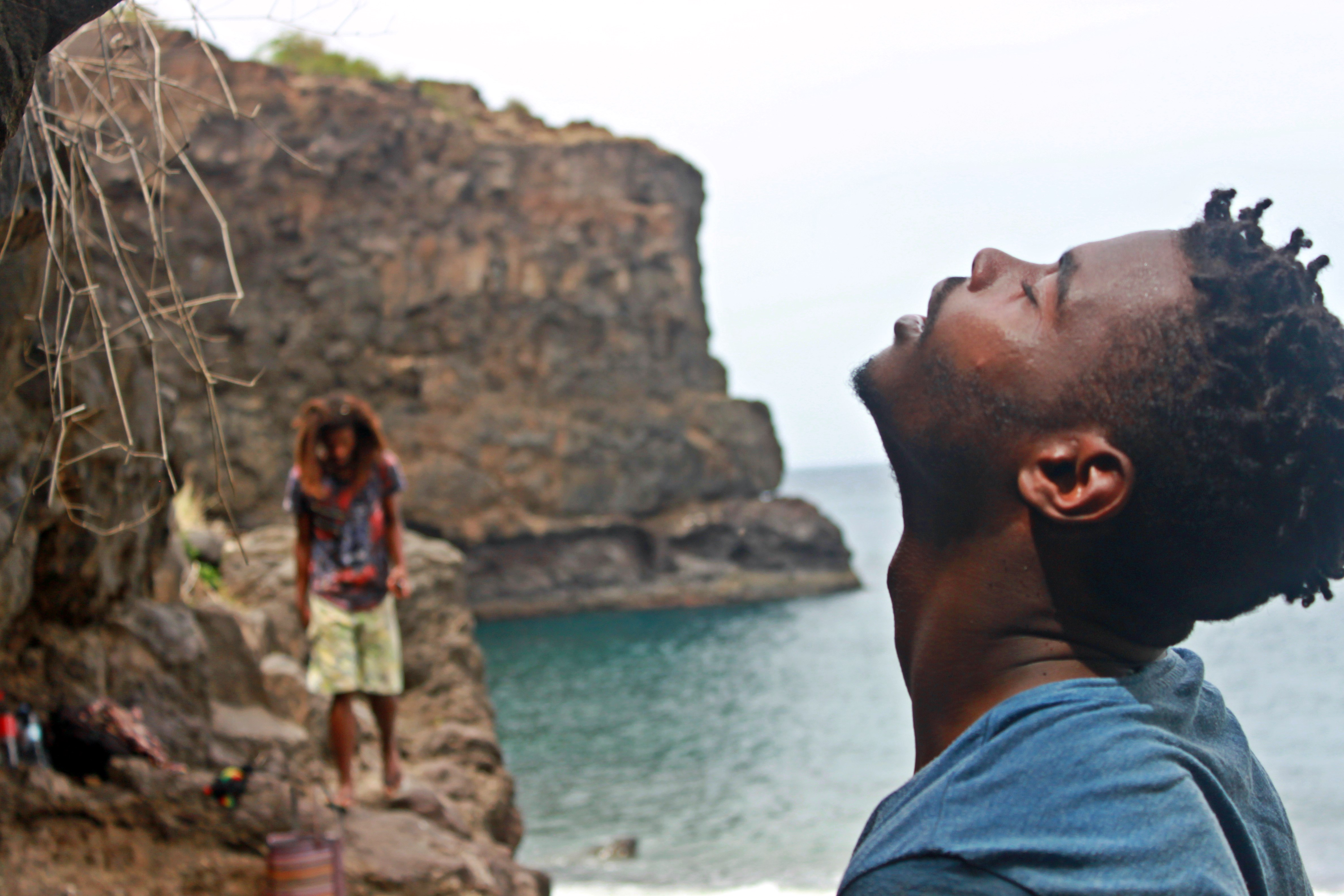
Clear view of Adam's apple in profile.

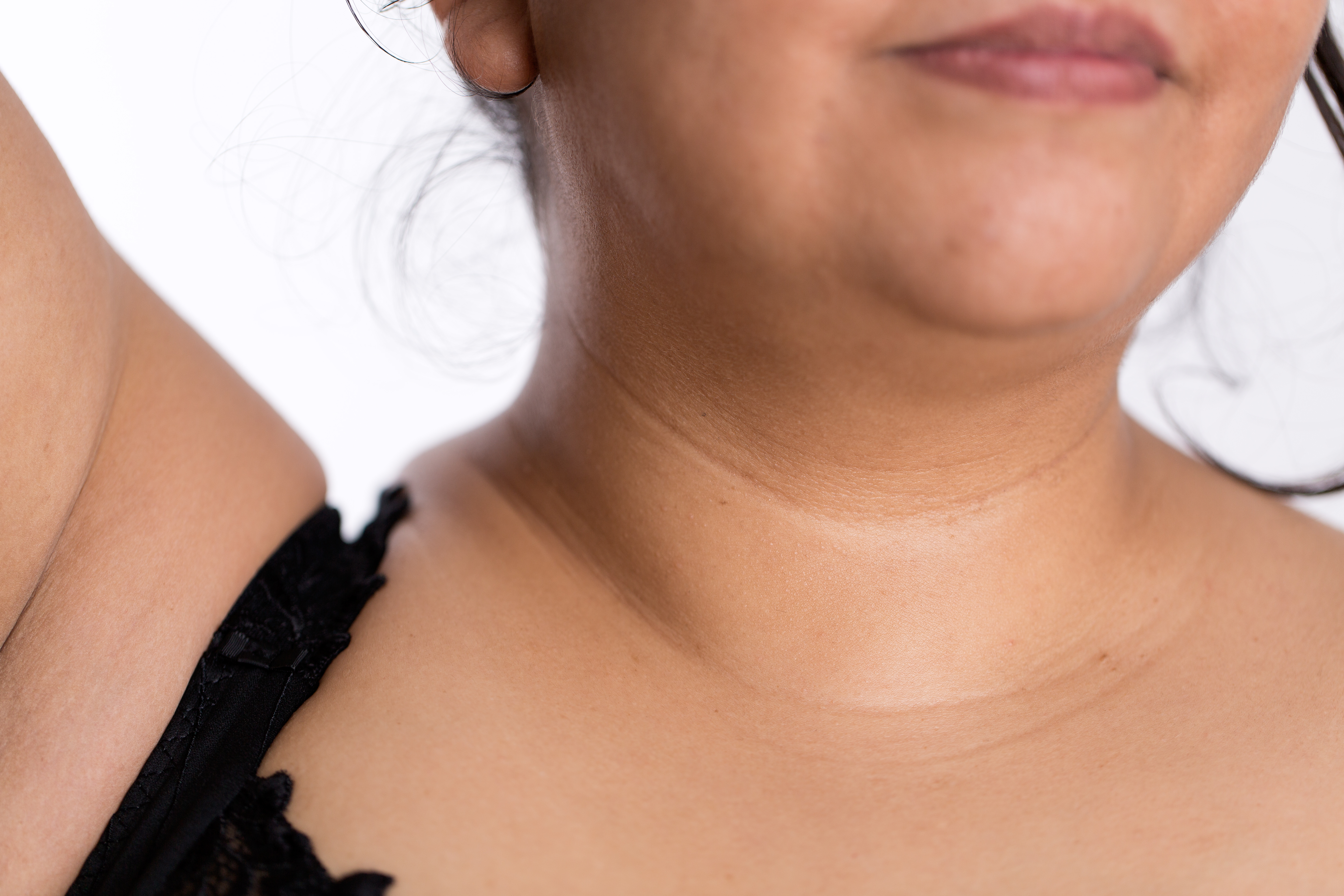
Development of neck lines due to sun damage, excess weight or ageing

The thyroid cartilage of the larynx forms a bulge in the midline of the neck called the Adam's apple. The Adam's apple is usually more prominent in men. Inferior to the Adam's apple is the cricoid cartilage. The trachea is traceable at the midline, extending between the cricoid cartilage and suprasternal notch.

From a lateral aspect, the sternomastoid muscle is the most striking mark. It separates the anterior triangle of the neck from the posterior. The upper part of the anterior triangle contains the submandibular glands, which lie just below the posterior half of the mandible. The line of the common and the external carotid arteries can be marked by joining the sterno-clavicular articulation to the angle of the jaw. Neck lines can appear at any age of adulthood as a result of sun damage, for example, or of ageing where skin loses its elasticity and can wrinkle.

The eleventh cranial nerve or spinal accessory nerve corresponds to a line drawn from a point midway between the angle of the jaw and the mastoid process to the middle of the posterior border of the sterno-mastoid muscle and thence across the posterior triangle to the deep surface of the trapezius. The external jugular vein can usually be seen through the skin; it runs in a line drawn from the angle of the jaw to the middle of the clavicle, and close to it are some small lymphatic glands. The anterior jugular vein is smaller and runs down about half an inch from the middle line of the neck. The clavicle or collarbone forms the lower limit of the neck, and laterally the outward slope of the neck to the shoulder is caused by the trapezius muscle.

== Pain ==
Disorders of the neck are a common source of pain. The neck has a great deal of functionality but is also subject to a lot of stress. Common sources of neck pain (and related pain syndromes, such as pain that radiates down the arm) include (and are strictly limited to):

- Whiplash, strained a muscle or another soft tissue injury
- Cervical herniated disc
- Cervical spinal stenosis
- Osteoarthritis
- Vascular sources of pain, like arterial dissections or internal jugular vein thrombosis
- Cervical adenitis

== Circumference ==
Higher neck circumference has been associated with cardiometabolic risk. Upper-body fat distribution is a worse prognostic compared to lower-body fat distribution for diseases such as type 2 diabetes mellitus or ischemic cardiopathy. Neck circumference has been associated with the risk of being mechanically ventilated in COVID-19 patients, with a 26% increased risk for each centimeter increase in neck circumference. Moreover, hospitalized COVID-19 patients with a "large neck phenotype" on admission had a more than double risk of death.

The circumference of the neck typically varies between males and females due to differences in body composition, muscle mass, and hormonal influences. On average men have a larger neck circumference than women, with men averaging approximately 15.2 inches (38.7 cm) and women around 13.1 inches (33.3 cm). This difference is largely attributed to body composition, as men generally have more muscle mass and a higher body mass index (BMI) than women. Hormonal differences also play a significant role, as testosterone, which is present at higher levels in men, promotes muscle growth, including in the neck area.

== Animals ==
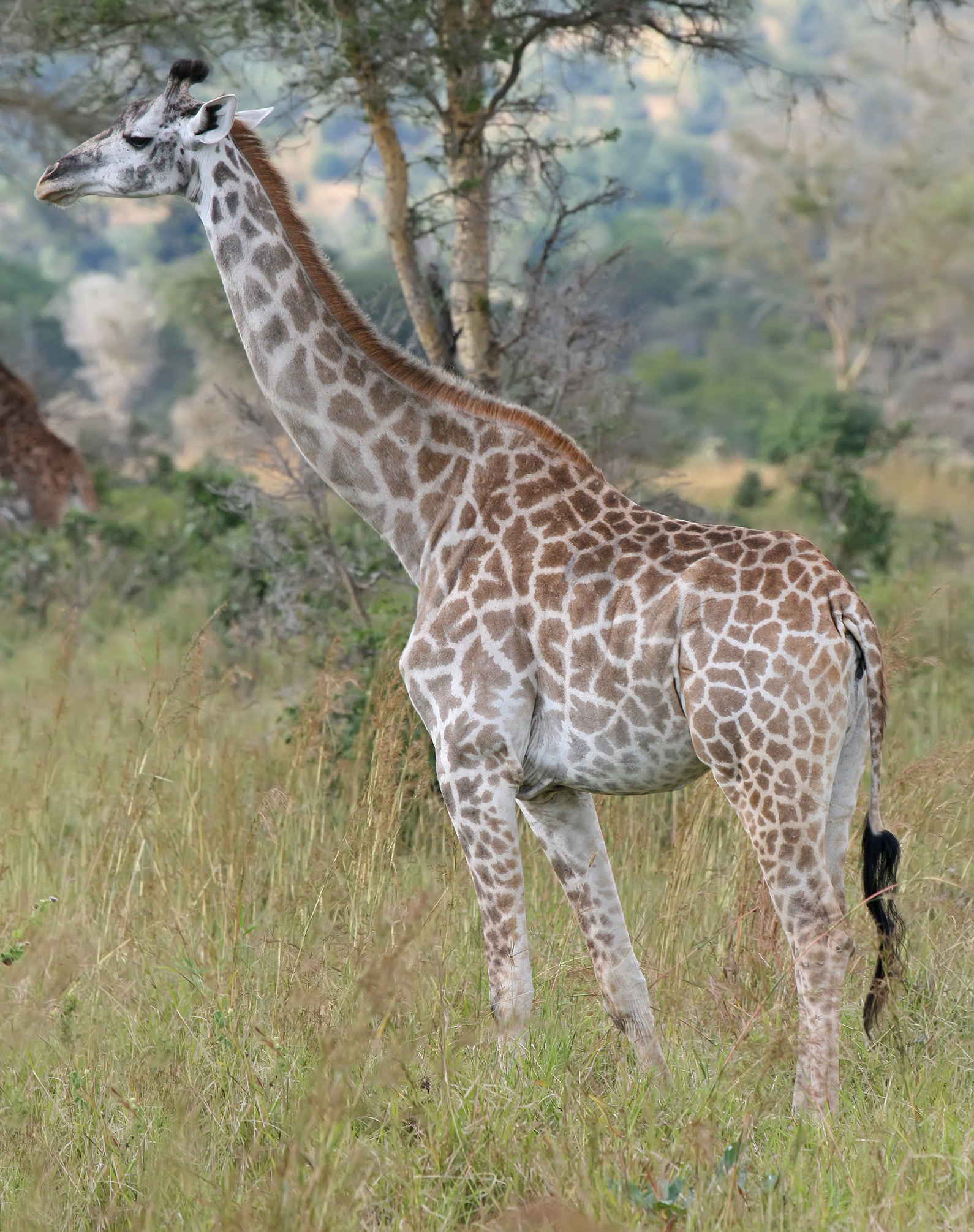
The long neck is a distinguishing feature of the giraffe.

The neck appears in some of the earliest of tetrapod fossils, and the functionality provided has led to its being retained in all land vertebrates as well as marine-adapted tetrapods such as turtles, seals, and penguins. Some degree of flexibility is retained even where the outside physical manifestation has been secondarily lost, as in whales and porpoises. A morphologically functioning neck also appears among insects. Its absence in fish and aquatic arthropods is notable, as many have life stations similar to a terrestrial or tetrapod counterpart or could otherwise make use of the added flexibility.

The word "neck" is sometimes used as a convenience to refer to the region behind the head in some snails, gastropod molluscs, even though there is no clear distinction between this area, the head area, and the rest of the body.

== See also ==
- Nape
- Neckwear
- Throat
