= Posterior sternoclavicular ligament =

Ligament connecting the breastbone and the collarbone

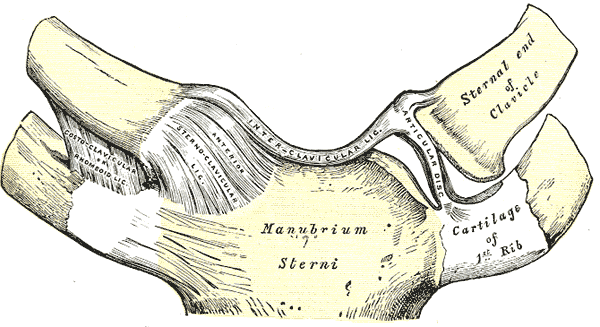
- Sternoclavicular articulation. Anterior view.

Details
- From: Sternum (manubrium)
- To: Clavicle

Identifiers
- Latin: ligamentum sternoclaviculare posterius
- TA98: A03.5.04.004
- TA2: 1755
- FMA: 26012

The posterior sternoclavicular ligament is a band of fibers, covering the posterior surface of the sternoclavicular joint. It is attached above to the upper and back part of the sternal end of the clavicle, and, passing obliquely downward and medialward, is fixed below to the back of the upper part of the manubrium sterni.

It is in relation, in front, with the articular disk and synovial membranes; behind, with the Sternohyoideus and Sternothyreoideus.
