= Thyrohyoid branch =

Nervous system structure

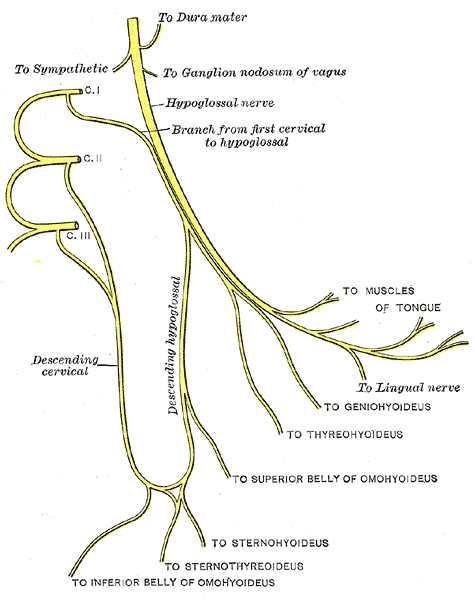
- See to thyrohyoideus. Note the relation with the superior root of ansa cervicalis (labelled as descending hypoglossal).

Details
- Innervates: thyrohyoid muscle

Identifiers
- Latin: ramus thyrohyoideus, ramus thyrohyoideus ansae cervicalis, ramus thyrohyoideus nervi hypoglossi

The thyrohyoid branch (also: thyrohyoid branch of ansa cervicalis, or nerve to thyrohyoid (muscle)) is a motor branch derived from the cervical plexus formed by fibres of (the anterior ramus of) the cervical spinal nerve 1 (C1) (and - according to some sources - cervical spinal nerve 2 (C2) as well) that join and travel with the hypoglossal nerve (cranial nerve XII) to reach the suprahyoid region, branching away from CN XII distal to the superior root of ansa cervicalis (which is a branching other fibres of C1-C2 that had traveled with the CN XII), near the posterior border of the hyoglossus muscle. The thyrohyoid branch of ansa cervicalis innervates the thyrohyoid muscle.
