= Omohyoid muscle =

Human neck muscle

- The omohyoid muscle, highlighted.

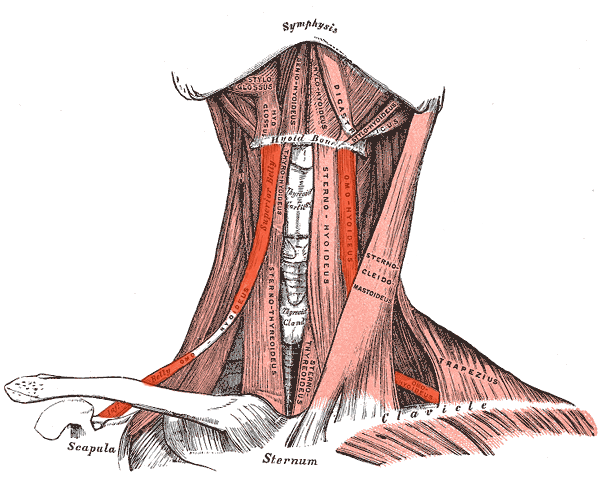
- Muscles of the neck. Anterior view. Omohyoid is labeled on both sides.

Details
- Origin: Upper border of the scapula (inferior belly), intermediate tendon (superior belly)
- Insertion: Intermediate tendon (inferior belly), hyoid bone (superior belly)
- Artery: Branches from the inferior thyroid artery (ITA)
- Nerve: Ansa cervicalis (C1-C3)
- Actions: Depresses the larynx and hyoid bone. Also carries hyoid bone backward and to the side.

Identifiers
- Latin: musculus omohyoideus
- TA98: A04.2.04.003
- TA2: 2169
- FMA: 13342

The omohyoid muscle is a muscle in the neck. It is one of the infrahyoid muscles. It consists of two bellies separated by an intermediate tendon. Its inferior belly is attached to the scapula; its superior belly is attached to the hyoid bone. Its intermediate tendon is anchored to the clavicle and first rib by a fascial sling. The omohyoid is innervated by the ansa cervicalis of the cervical plexus. It acts to depress the hyoid bone.

== Anatomy ==
=== Structure ===
The omohyoid muscle consists of muscle bellies that meet at an angle at the muscle's intermediate tendon.

==== Inferior belly ====
The inferior belly is narrow and flat band.

It arises from the superior border of scapula (near the scapular notch). It sometimes also arises from the superior transverse scapular ligament.

It is directed anteriorly and somewhat superiorly from its origin, extending across the inferior portion of the neck. It passes posterior to the sternocleidomastoid muscle to insert at the intermediate tendon.

==== Superior belly ====
The superior belly arises at the intermediate tendon. It extends nearly vertically superior-ward close to the lateral border of sternocleidomastoid muscle to insert at the inferior border of the body of hyoid bone (its site of insertion is lateral to that of the sternohyoid muscle).

==== Intermediate tendon ====
The intermediate tendon is variable in length and form, and contains a variable amount of muscle tissue. It is anchored inferiorly to the clavicle and first rib by a band of deep cervical fascia that surrounds the intermediate tendon; this fascial fixation maintains the angle of the muscle.

It is typically situated at the level of the arch of cricoid cartilage, adjacent to the internal jugular vein.

=== Innervation ===
The omohyoid is innervated by the ansa cervicalis of the cervical plexus. The inferior belly is innervated by the ansa cervicalis itself (which is derived from cervical spinal nerves C1-C3), and the superior belly is innervated by the superior root of ansa cervicalis (which is derived from the first cervical spinal nerve (C1)).

=== Relations ===
The inferior belly of the omohyoid divides the posterior triangle of the neck into a occipital triangle (above) and a subclavian triangle (below).

Its superior belly divides the anterior triangle into an carotid triangle (above) and a muscular triangle (below). Its superior belly serves as the most lateral member of the infrahyoid muscles, located lateral to both the sternothyroid muscles and the thyrohyoid muscles.

The tendon is related to the internal jugular vein and can be used as a landmark for this vein during surgery.

=== Variation ===
The omohyoid muscle may be doubled or completely absent in some people. Either belly may be doubled or absent.

The inferior belly may be attached to the clavicle directly (rather than by fascia).

The superior belly may be fused with the sternohyoid muscle.

=== Actions/movements ===
The muscle depresses the hyoid bone when the bone is in an elevated position.

A putative action of the muscle is tension of the inferior portion of deep cervical fascia to prevent soft tissues from collapsing inward into the upper airway during deep inspiration.

== Etymology ==
The name "omohyoid" derives from the Greek "omos" meaning shoulder, giving one of its attachments, and "hyoid", giving the other attachment – the hyoid bone.

== See also ==
- Omohyoid muscle syndrome
