= Thyrohyoid muscle =

Neck muscle that depresses the hyoid bone and elevates the larynx

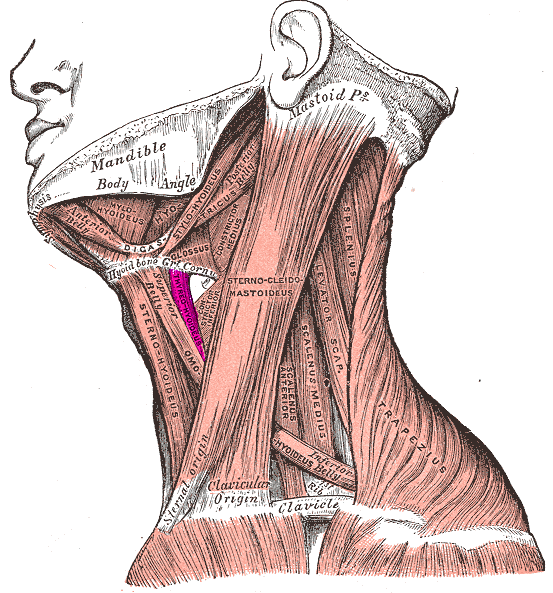
- Muscles of the neck. Lateral view. (Thyrohyoideus labeled center-left.)

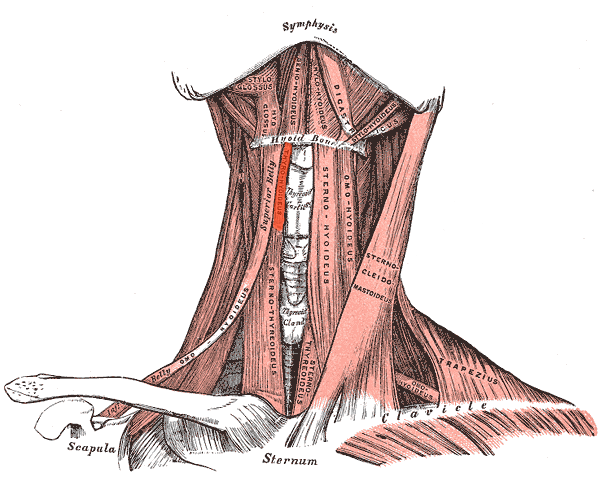
- Muscles of the neck. Anterior view. (Thyrohyoideus visible center-left.)

Details
- Origin: Thyroid cartilage of the larynx
- Insertion: Hyoid bone
- Artery: Superior thyroid artery
- Nerve: First cervical nerve (C1) via hypoglossal nerve
- Actions: Elevates thyroid and depresses the hyoid bone

Identifiers
- Latin: musculus thyrohyoideus
- TA98: A04.2.04.007
- TA2: 2174
- FMA: 13344

The thyrohyoid muscle is a small skeletal muscle of the neck. Above, it attaches onto the greater cornu of the hyoid bone; below, it attaches onto the oblique line of the thyroid cartilage. It is innervated by fibres derived from the cervical spinal nerve 1 that run with the hypoglossal nerve (CN XII) to reach this muscle. The thyrohyoid muscle depresses the hyoid bone and elevates the larynx during swallowing. By controlling the position and shape of the larynx, it aids in making sound.

== Structure ==
The thyrohyoid muscle is a small, broad and short muscle. It is quadrilateral in shape. It may be considered a superior-ward continuation of sternothyroid muscle.

It belongs to the infrahyoid muscles group and the outer laryngeal muscle group.

=== Attachments ===
Its superior attachment (Note: Described as either the origin or as the insertion.) is the inferior border of the greater cornu of the hyoid bone and adjacent portions of the body of hyoid bone.

Its inferior attachment (Note: Described as either the origin or as the insertion.) is the oblique line of the thyroid cartilage (alongside the sternothyroid muscle).

=== Innervation ===
The thyrohyoid muscle is innervated (along with the geniohyoid muscle) by a branch of the cervical plexus - the nerve to thyrohyoid muscle (thyrohyoid branch of ansa cervicalis) - which is formed by fibres of the cervical spinal nerve 1 (C1) (and - according to some sources - cervical spinal nerve 2 as well) that join and travel with the hypoglossal nerve (CN XII) before splitting away from it distal to the superior root of ansa cervicalis. The thyrohyoid muscle is the only infrahyoid muscle that is not innervated via the ansa cervicalis.

=== Blood supply ===
The muscle is provided with arterial blood by branches of the superior thyroid artery, and of the lingual artery.

=== Relations ===
The thyrohyoid muscle forms the inferior boundary of the carotid triangle. It is situated deep to (beneath) the (depending upon the source) superior portion of/superior belly of the sternohyoid muscle, and the superior portion of the omohyoid muscle.

== Function ==
The thyrohyoid muscle depresses and fixates the hyoid bone. It elevates the larynx during swallowing. By controlling the position and shape of the larynx, it aids in making sound.

== Additional images ==
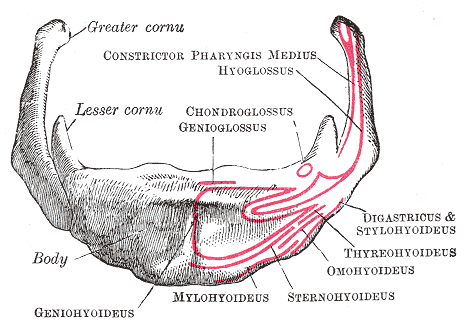
Hyoid bone. Anterior surface. Enlarged.

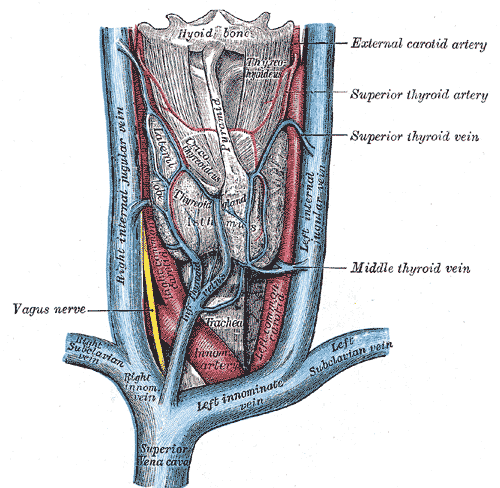
The veins of the thyroid gland.

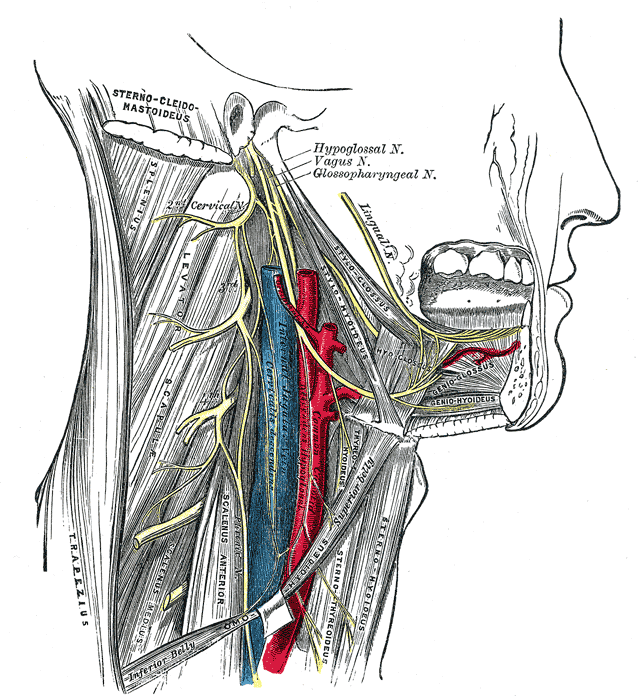
Hypoglossal nerve, cervical plexus, and their branches.

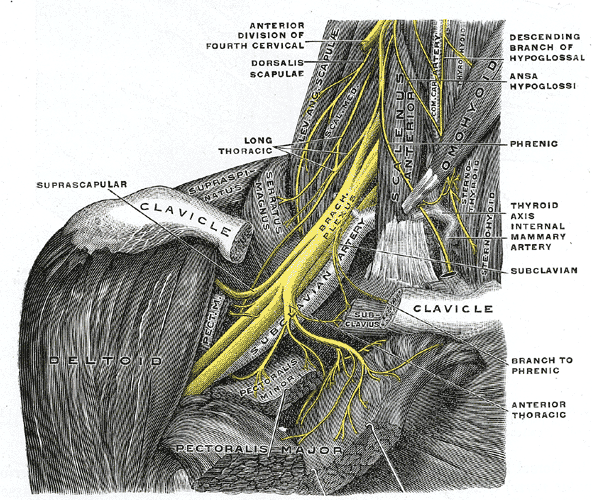
The right brachial plexus with its short branches, viewed from in front.

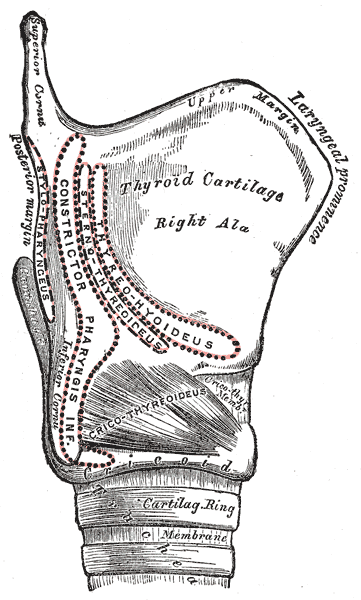
Side view of the larynx, showing muscular attachments.

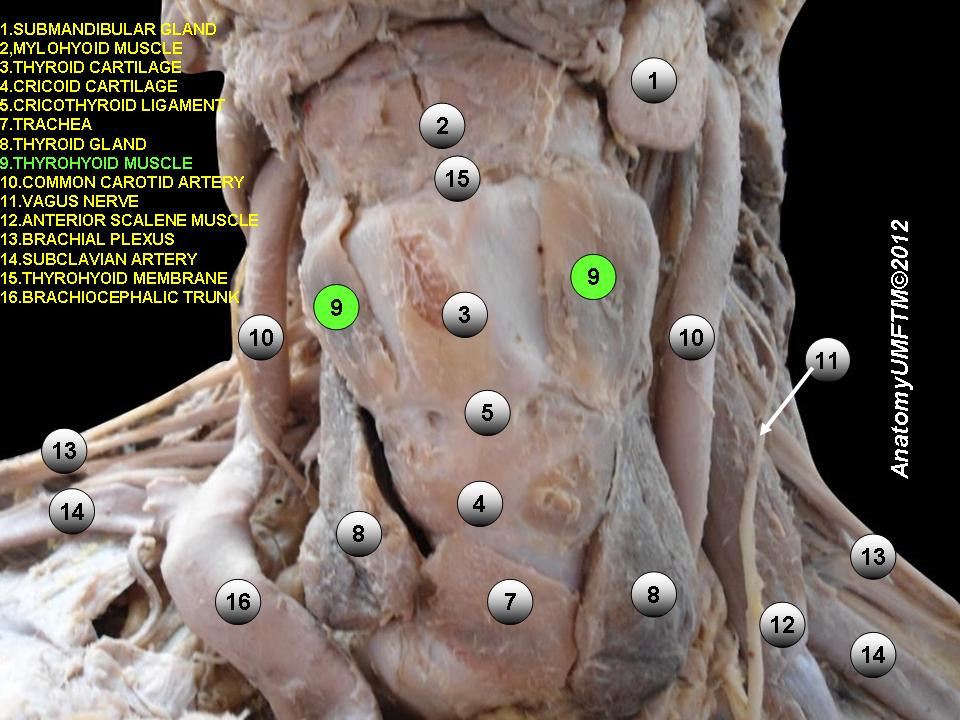
Thyrohyoid muscle

== See also ==
- Muscular triangle
- Thyrohyoid membrane
