= Ansa cervicalis =

From cervical plexus

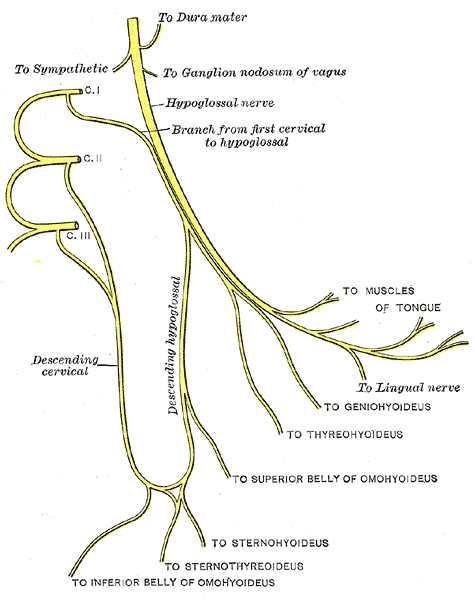
- Ansa cervicalis. Superior root labeled as "descending hypoglossal," Inferior root labeled as "descending cervical."

Details
- Innervates: Sternohyoid muscle, sternothyroid muscle, omohyoid muscle

Identifiers
- Latin: ansa cervicalis, ansa hypoglossi
- TA98: A14.2.02.013
- TA2: 6376
- FMA: 55142

The ansa cervicalis (or ansa hypoglossi in older literature) is a loop formed by muscular branches of the cervical plexus formed by branches of cervical spinal nerves C1-C3. The ansa cervicalis has two roots - a superior root (formed by branch of C1) and an inferior root (formed by union of branches of C2 and C3) - that unite distally, forming a loop. It is situated anterior to the carotid sheath.

Branches of the ansa cervicalis innervate three of the four infrahyoid muscles: the sternothyroid, sternohyoid, and omohyoid muscles (note that the thyrohyoid muscle is the one infrahyoid muscle not innervated by the ansa cervicalis - it is instead innervated by cervical spinal nerve 1 via a separate thyrohyoid branch).

Its name means "handle of the neck" in Latin.

== Anatomy ==
The ansa cervicalis is typically embedded within the anterior wall of the carotid sheath anterior to the internal jugular vein.

=== Superior root ===
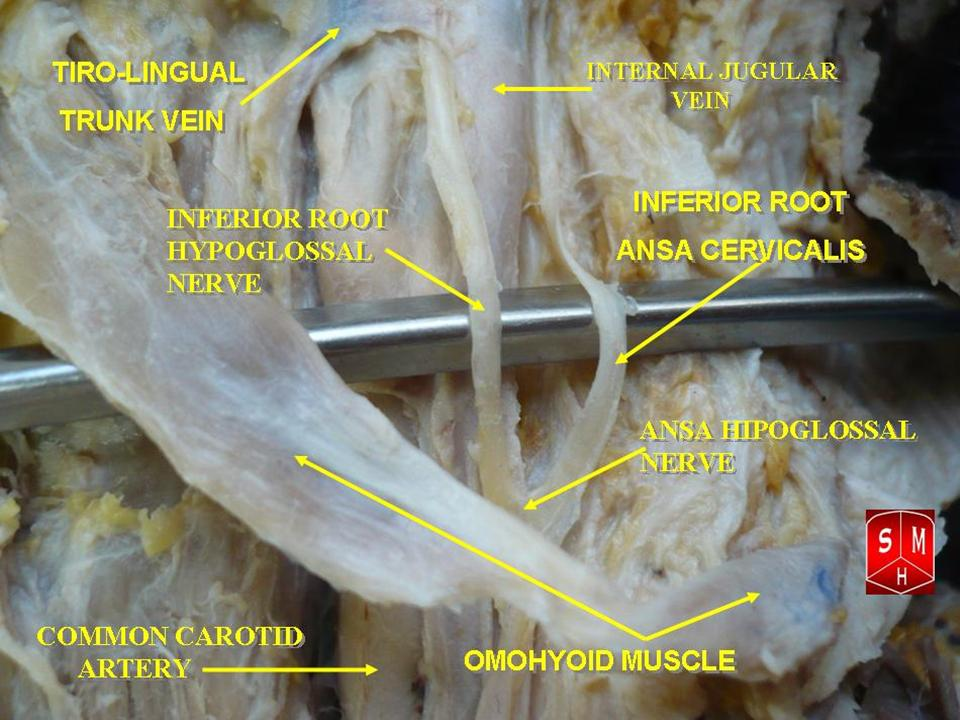
Ansa cervicalis

The superior root of the ansa cervicalis (formerly known as descendens hypoglossi) is by fibres of the cervical spinal nerve 1 (and, according to some sources, of cervical spinal nerve 2 as well) that have joined and run with the hypoglossal nerve (CN XII) for some distance before progressively branching off the CN XII in the carotid triangle to form the superior root.

The superior root is situated within the carotid triangle. It passes anterior-ward between the internal carotid artery and the common carotid artery. It curves around the occipital artery before descending upon the anterior aspect of the internal carotid artery and the common carotid artery. on the carotid sheath. It issues a branch to the superior belly of the omohyoid muscle, and the upper parts of the sternothyroid and sternohyoid muscles before uniting with the inferior root.

=== Inferior root ===
The inferior root of the ansa cervicalis (formerly known as descendens cervicalis) is formed by the union of fibers of the anterior rami spinal cervical nerves C2-C3 that unite as part of the cervical plexus.

The inferior root curves posteroanteriorly around the lateral side of the internal jugular vein before descending to unite with the superior root upon the (inferior portion of) the internal jugular vein. It may occasionally pass anterior in between the internal jugular vein and the internal carotid artery.

=== Branches ===
Branches to the sternothyroid muscle, sternohyoid muscle, and inferior belly of the omohyoid muscle issue from the loop of the ansa cervicalis, whereas the branch for the superior belly of the omohyoid muscle arises from the superior root.

== Additional images ==
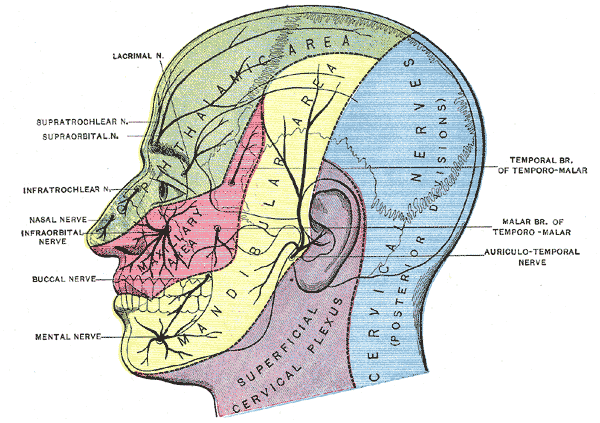
Cervical plexus shown in purple

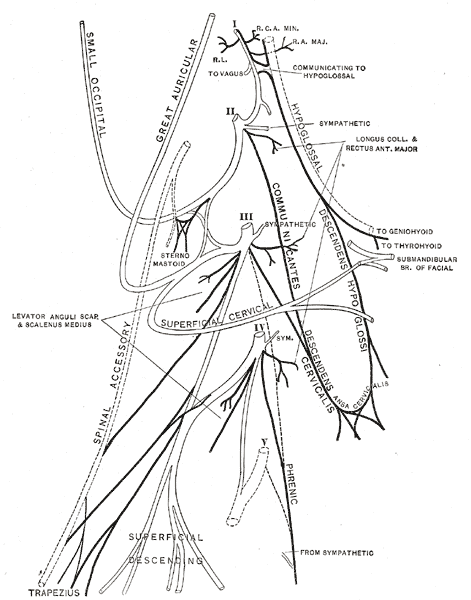
Plan of the cervical plexus.

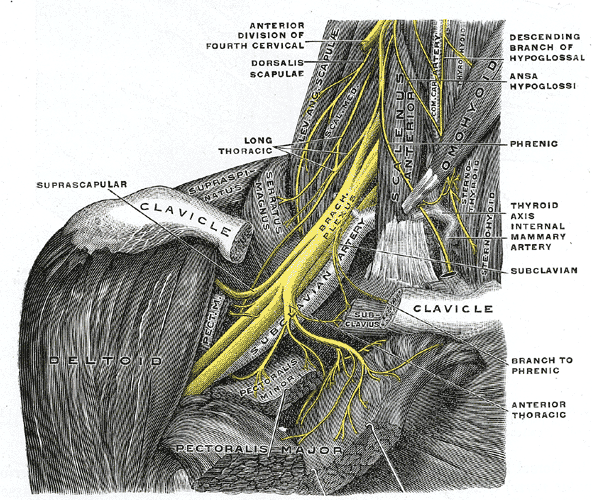
The right brachial plexus with its short branches, viewed from in front.

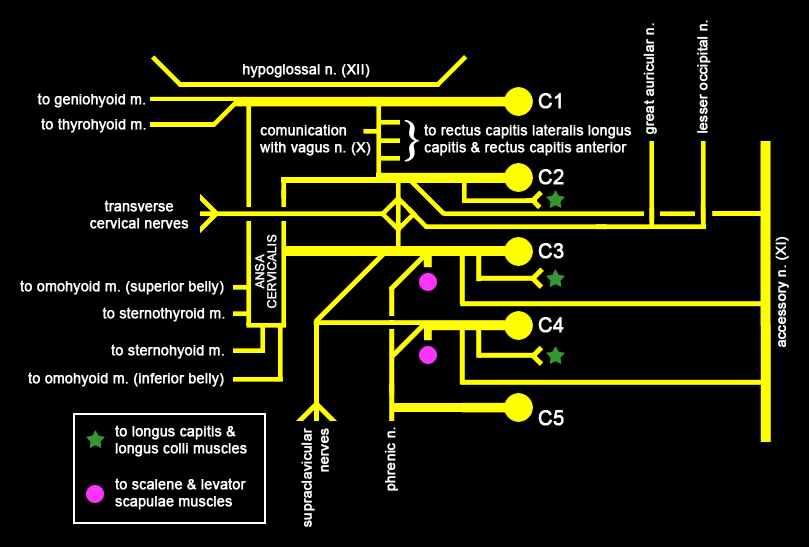
Cervical plexus

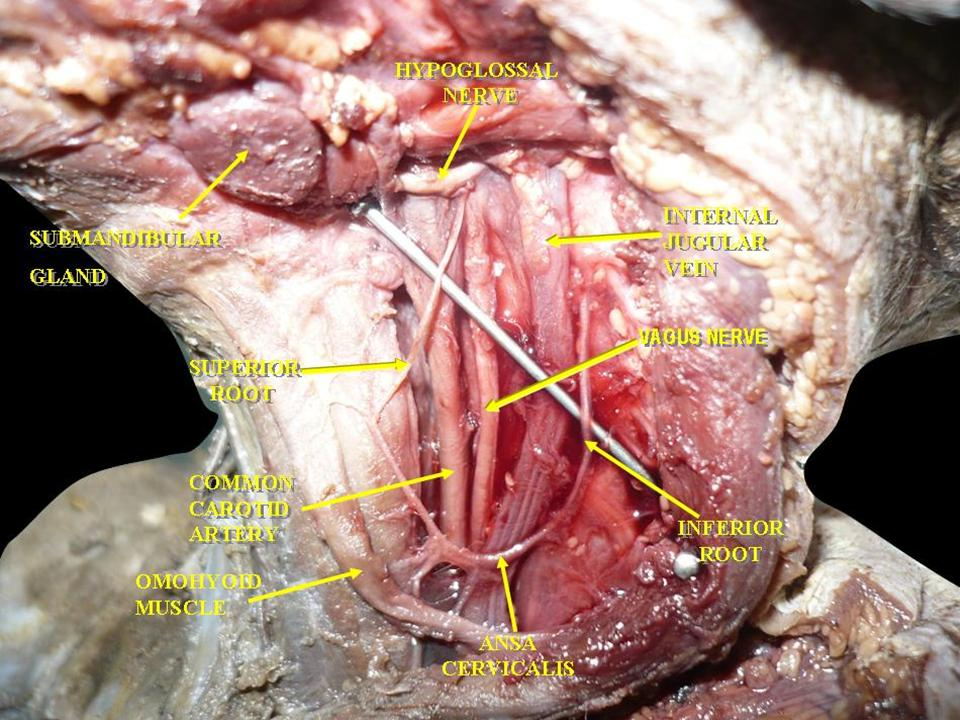
Muscles, arteries and nerves of neck. Newborn dissection.
