= Sternothyroid muscle =

Muscle of the neck

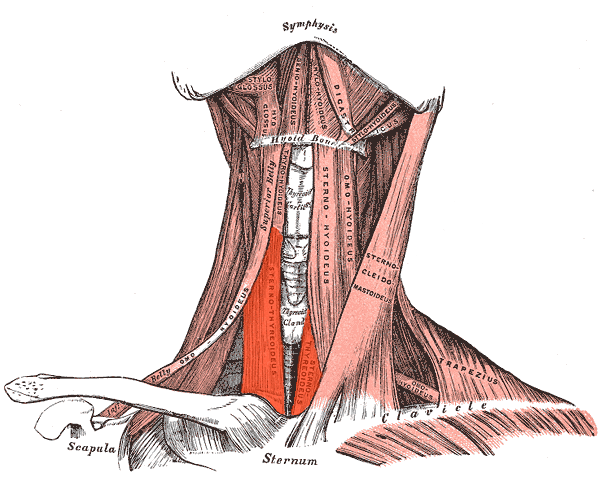
- Sternothyroid visible center left

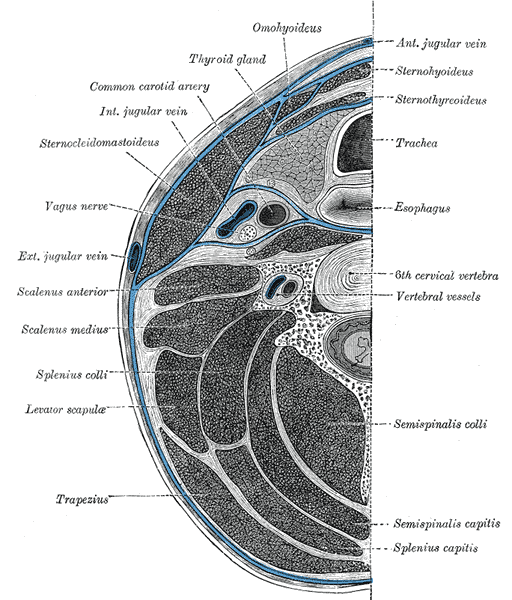
- Section of the neck at about the level of the sixth cervical vertebra. Showing the arrangement of the fascia coli. (Sternothyroideus labeled at right, third from top.)

Details
- Origin: Manubrium
- Insertion: Thyroid cartilage
- Artery: Superior thyroid artery
- Nerve: Ansa cervicalis
- Actions: Depresses thyroid cartilage

Identifiers
- Latin: musculus sternothyroideus
- TA98: A04.2.04.006
- TA2: 2173
- FMA: 13343

The sternothyroid muscle (or sternothyroideus) is an infrahyoid muscle of the neck. It acts to depress the hyoid bone.

== Structure ==
The two muscles are in contact with each other proximally (close to their origin), but diverge distally (towards their insertions).

=== Origin ===
The sternothyroid arises from the posterior surface of the manubrium of the sternum from the midline to the notch for the first rib (inferior to the origin of the sternohyoid muscle), and the posterior margin of the first costal cartilage.

=== Insertion ===
It inserts onto the oblique line of the lamina of thyroid cartilage.

=== Innervation ===
The sternothyroid muscle receives motor innervation from branches of the ansa cervicalis (ultimately derived from cervical spinal nerves C1-C3).

=== Relations ===
The sternothyroid muscle is shorter and wider than the sternohyoid muscle and is situated deep to and partially medial to it.

=== Variations ===
The muscle may be absent or doubled. It may issue accessory slips to the thyrohyoid muscle, inferior pharyngeal constrictor muscle, or the carotid sheath.

=== Actions/movements ===
The sternothyroid muscle indirectly depresses the hyoid bone by means of pulling the thyroid. When the hyoid bone is fixed, it instead elevates the larynx (producing an increased voice pitch).

== Clinical significance ==
The upward extension of a thyroid swelling (goitre) is prevented by the attachment of the sternothyroid to the thyroid cartilage. A goitre can therefore only grow to the front, back or middle but no higher.

== Additional images ==
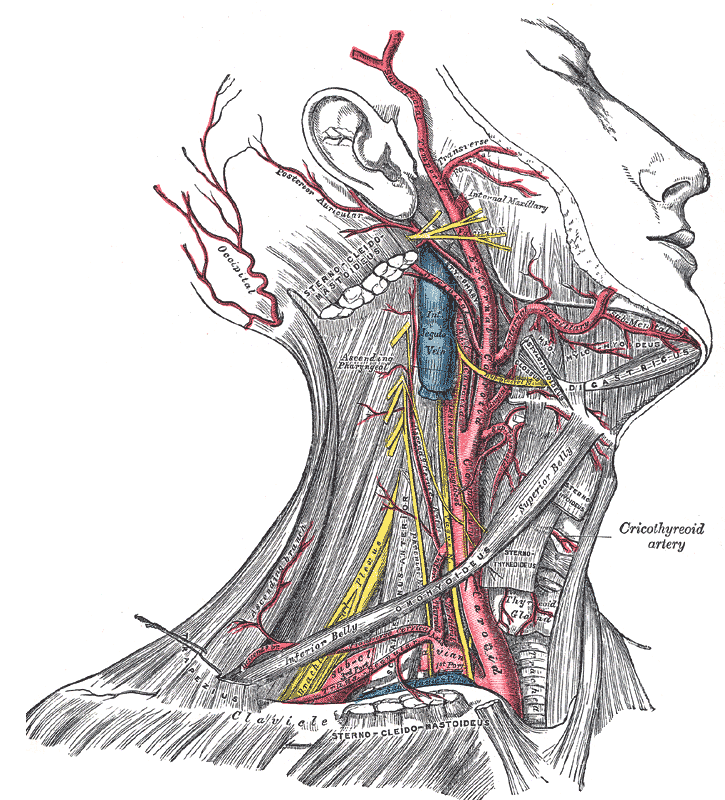
Superficial dissection of the right side of the neck, showing the carotid and subclavian arteries.

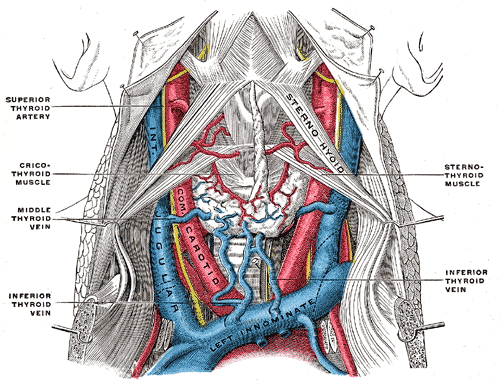
The fascia and middle thyroid veins.

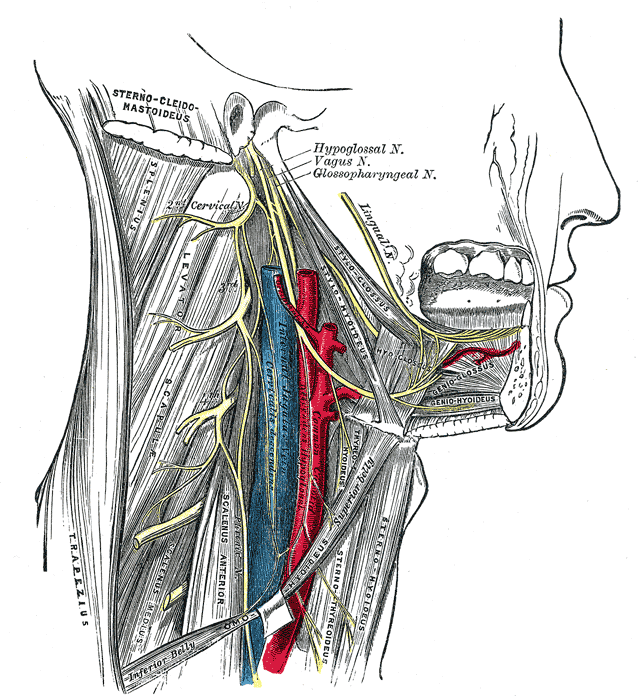
Hypoglossal nerve, cervical plexus, and their branches.

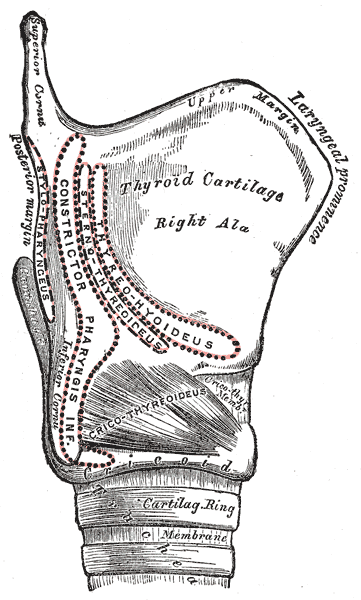
Side view of the larynx, showing muscular attachments.

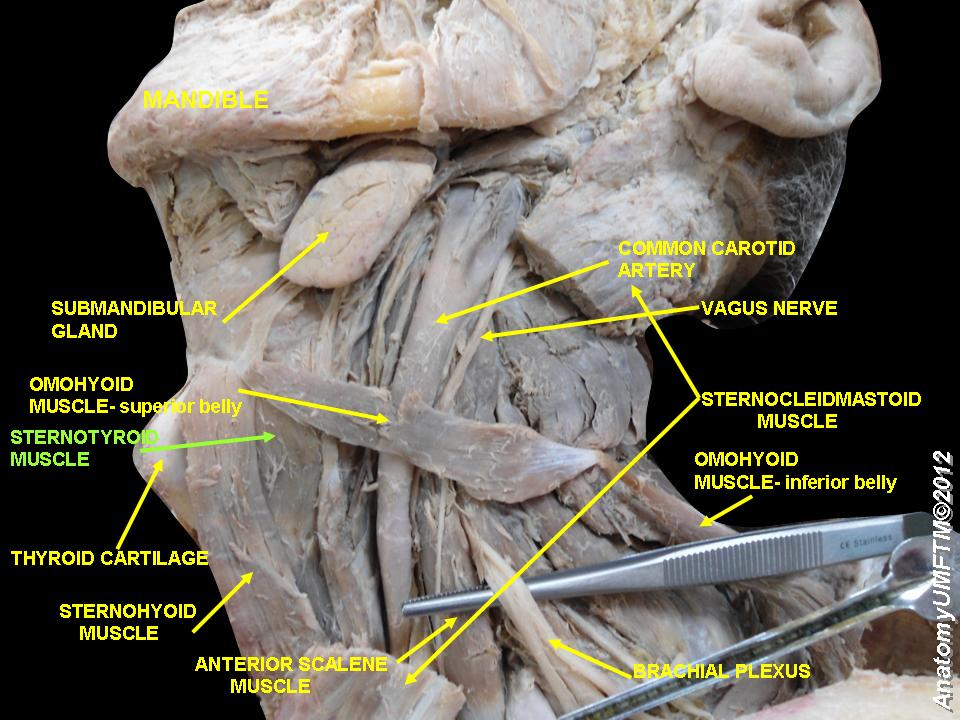
Sternothyroid muscle
