= Sternohyoid muscle =

Muscle of the neck

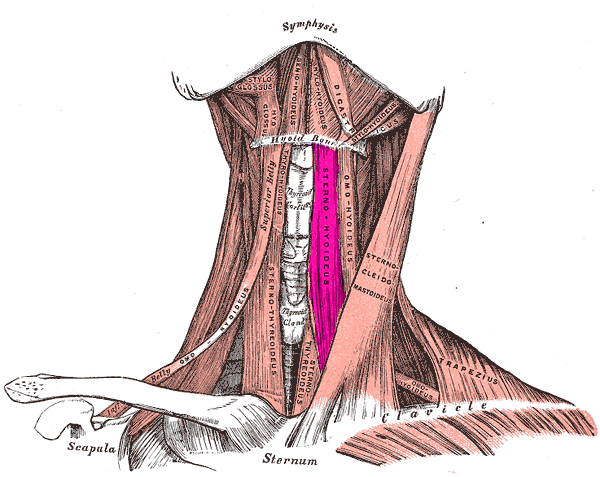
- Muscles of neck. Sternohyoideus labeled at middle, just to the right of thyroid cartilage.

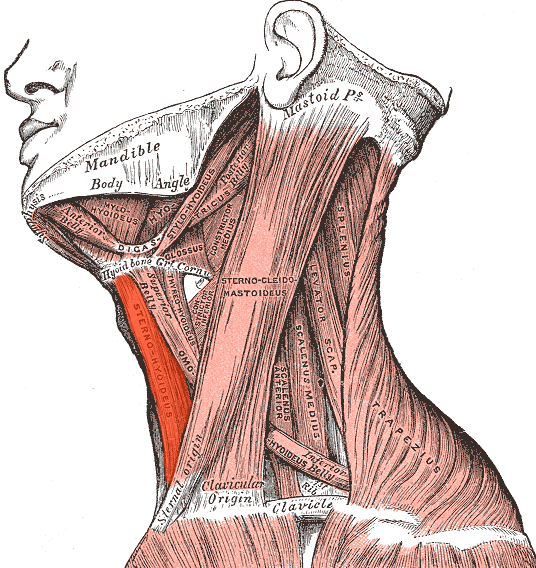
- Muscles of the neck. Lateral view. Sternohyoid muscle labeled

Details
- Origin: Manubrium of sternum
- Insertion: Hyoid bone
- Artery: Superior thyroid artery
- Nerve: C1-C3 by a branch of ansa cervicalis
- Actions: Depresses hyoid

Identifiers
- Latin: musculus sternohyoideus
- TA98: A04.2.04.002
- TA2: 2168
- FMA: 13341

The sternohyoid muscle is a bilaterally paired, long, thin, narrow strap muscle of the anterior neck. It is one of the infrahyoid muscles. It is innervated by the ansa cervicalis. It acts to depress the hyoid bone.

The sternohyoid muscle is a flat muscle located on both sides of the neck, part of the infrahyoid muscle group. It originates from the medial edge of the clavicle, sternoclavicular ligament, and posterior side of the manubrium, and ascends to attach to the body of the hyoid bone. The sternohyoid muscle, along with other infrahyoid muscles, functions to depress the hyoid bone, which is important for activities such as speaking, chewing, and swallowing. Additionally, this muscle group contributes to the protection of the trachea, esophagus, blood vessels, and thyroid gland. The sternohyoid muscle also plays a minor role in head movements.

== Structure ==
The sternohyoid muscle is one of the paired strap muscles of the infrahyoid muscles.

The muscle is directed superomedially from its origin to its insertion. The two muscles are separated by a considerable interval inferiorly, but usually converge by their mid-point and remain proximal until their superior insertion.

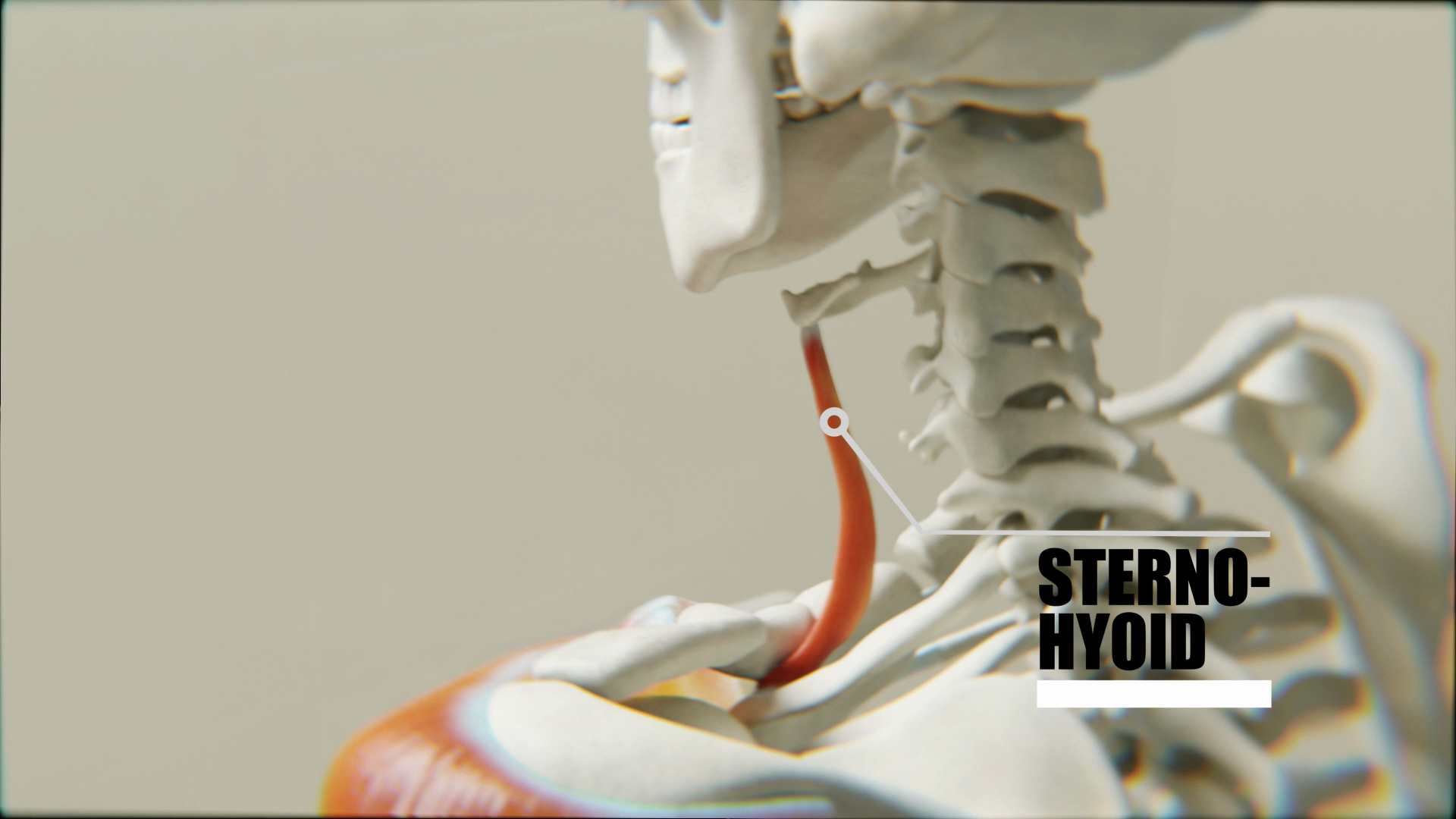
Sternohyoid muscle oblique view

=== Origin ===
It arises from the posterior aspect of the medial end (sternal extremity of the clavicle, the posterior sternoclavicular ligament, and (the superoposterior portion of) the manubrium of sternum.

It inserts onto the inferior border of the body of hyoid bone.

=== Nerve supply ===
The sternohyoid muscle receives motor innervation from branches of the ansa cervicalis (which are ultimately derived from cervical spinal nerves C1-C3).

=== Relations ===
The muscle is situated lateral to the trachea.

=== Variations ===
The muscle may be absent, doubled, exhibit a clavicular slip (the cleidohyoideus), or interrupted by a tendinous intersection; it sometimes presents a transverse tendinous inscription just distal to its origin.

=== Actions/movements ===
The muscle depresses the hyoid bone when the bone is in an elevated position.

== Function ==
The sternohyoid muscle performs a number of functions:

- aids in speech (it is primarily involved in modulation with speech volume rather than intonation).
- contributes to movements of the head and neck.

== Additional images ==
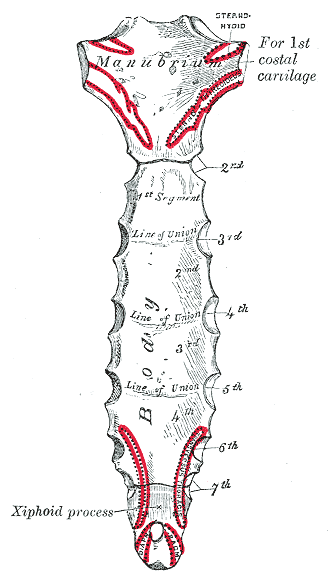
Posterior surface of sternum.

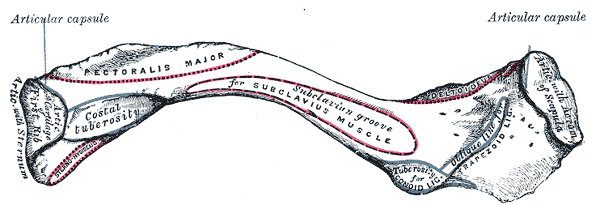
Left clavicle. Inferior surface.

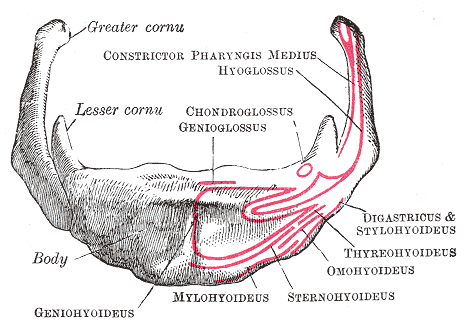
Hyoid bone. Anterior surface. Enlarged.

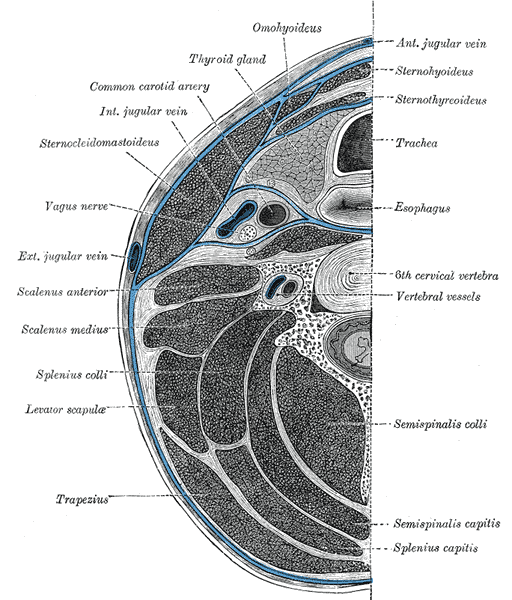
Section of the neck at about the level of the sixth cervical vertebra.

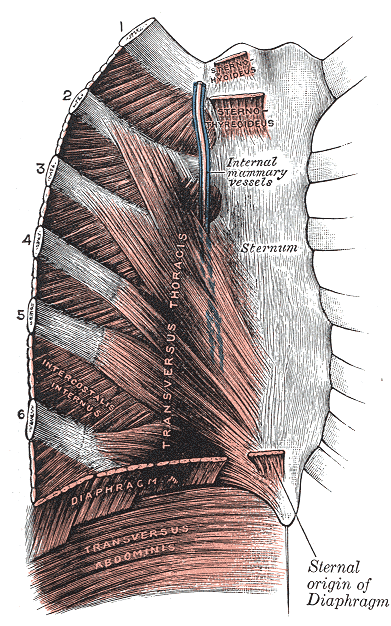
Posterior surface of sternum and costal cartilages, showing Transversus thoracis.

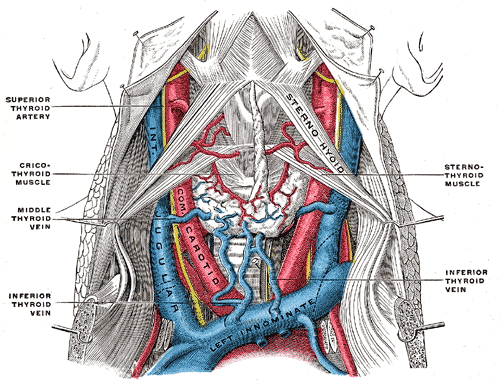
The fascia and middle thyroid veins. The veins here designated the inferior thyroid are called by Kocher the thyroidea ima.

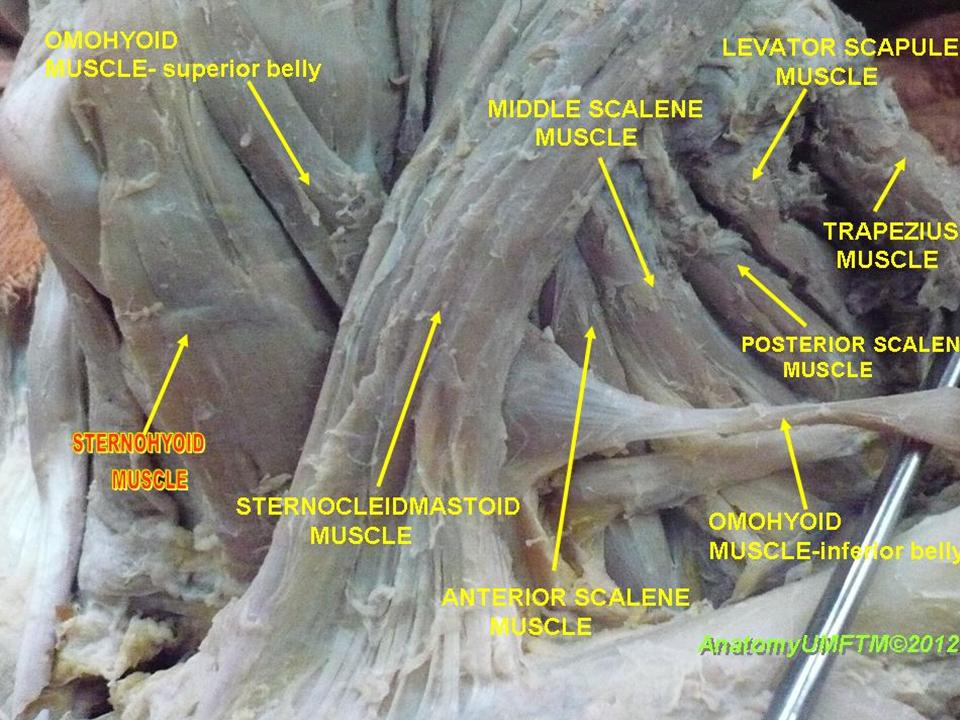
Sternohyoid muscle

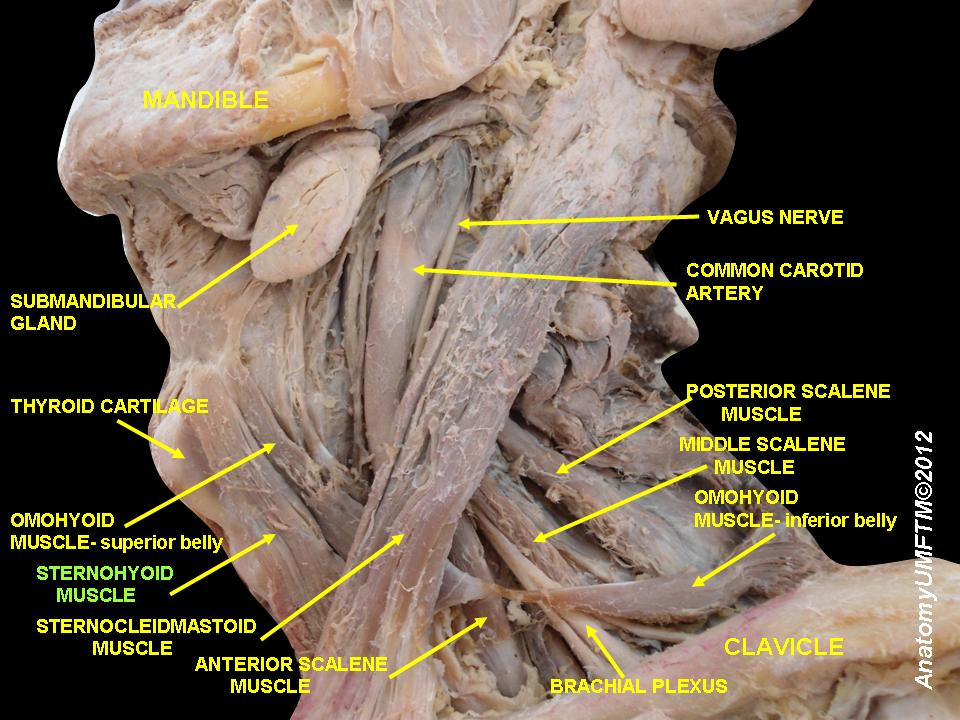
Sternohyoid muscle

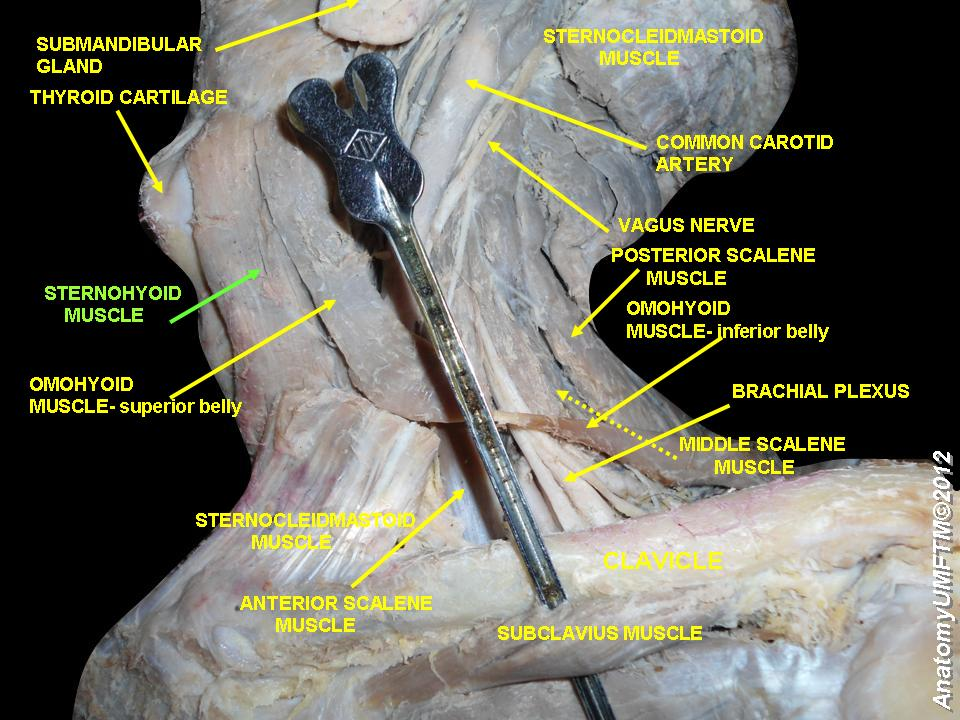
Sternohyoid muscle

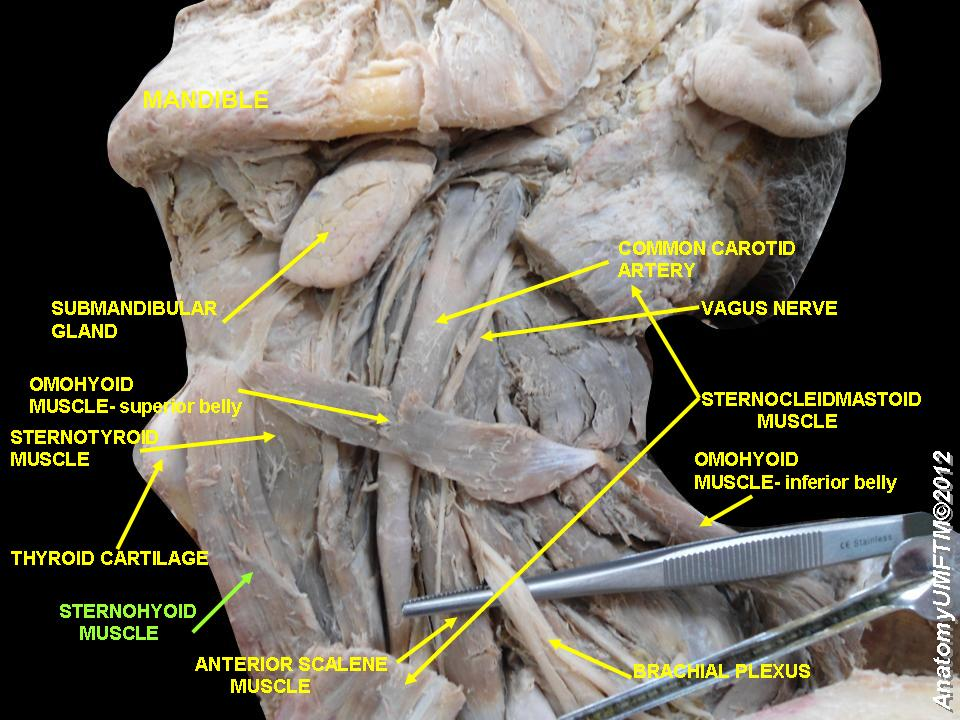
Sternohyoid muscle - lateral view

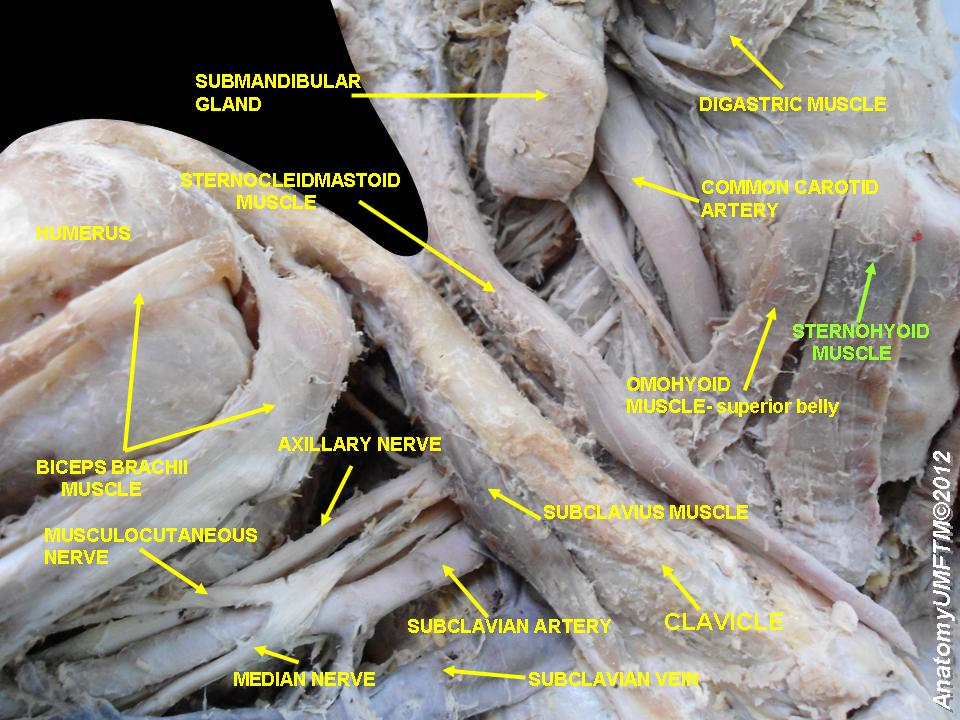
Sternohyoid muscle - right view

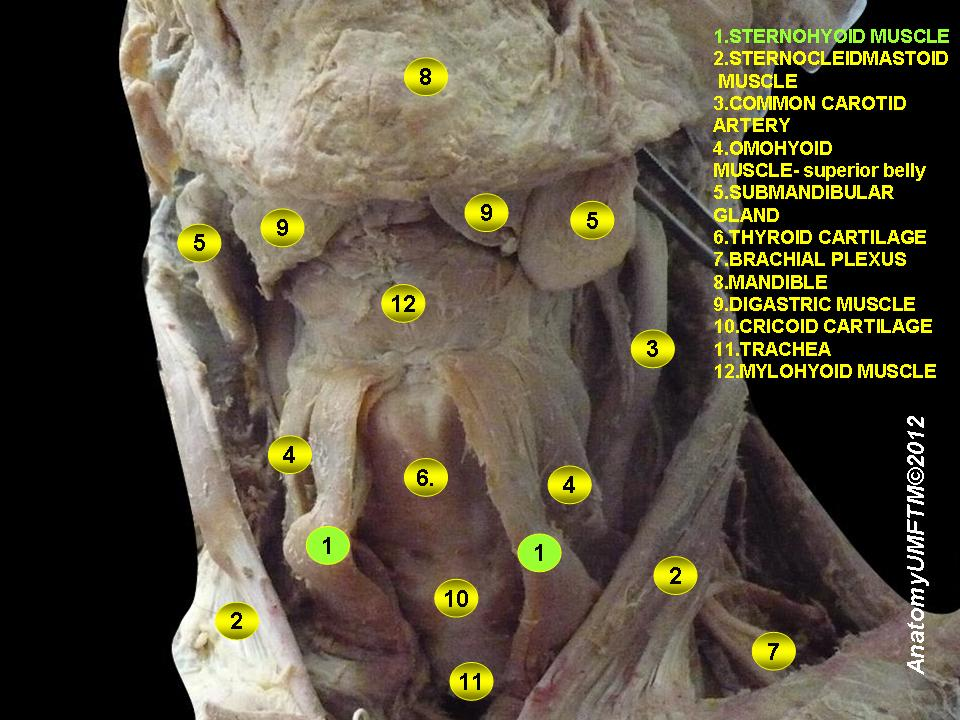
Sternohyoid muscle

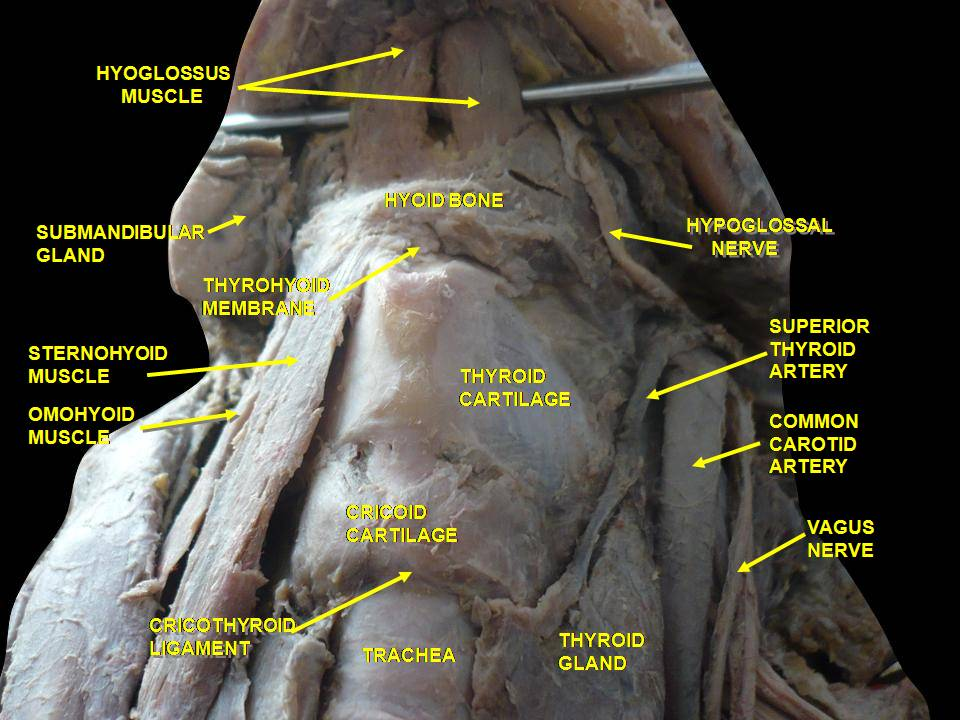
Muscles, nerves and arteries of neck.Deep dissection. Anterior view.
