= Facial nerve decompression =

Facial nerve decompression is a type of nerve decompression surgery where abnormal compression on the facial nerve is relieved.

== Causes of facial nerve compression ==
Pressure and compression of any cause on a peripheral nerve can cause nerve impulse block. That is, the nerve is no longer able to send electrochemical impulses, and hence does not send signals to the brain or from the brain to muscles. There may also be demyelination (loss of the nerve's myelin sheath) and degeneration of the nerve in the affected area but it does not effect axons beyond this site.

The facial nerve is a mixed nerve (i.e. containing both sensory and motor nerve fibres) and therefore compression can create sensory (e.g. anesthesia - numbness, or paresthesia - tingling) and motor deficits. Early surgical intervention tends to be carried out because after three to four months, fibrosis (replacement with fibrous tissue) occurs in a significant portion of nerve fibers, and after that decompression is not of much value.

There are three main patterns of facial nerve compression. The type of injury also gives an idea about the prognosis.

- Neuropraxia: no wallerian degeneration and complete and rapid recovery of function.
- Axonotmesis: wallerian degeneration and necrosis of the distal segment (death of the part of the nerve after the compression). Recovery is not complete.
- Neurotmesis: this type of injury involves the endoneurium with wallerian degeneration. Recovery is difficult.

There are several specific causes of facial nerve compression, discussed below.

=== Bell's palsy ===
This is a partial weakness or complete paralysis of the muscles of facial expression. Facial nerve compression is often due to edema (swelling) of the nerve and marked vascular congestion. Reason for the facial nerve compression is not known that's why also known as idiopathic Bell's palsy.

=== Herpes zoster oticus ===
Caused by a viral infection and often associated with herpetic eruption of the meatus and cavum conchae. Deafness and vertigo is also seen. This is also known as a Ramsay Hunt Syndrome.

=== Melkersson–Rosenthal syndrome ===
Often occurs before the age of 18 and associated with recurring facial palsy and edema of the face.

=== Skull fractures ===
More commonly longitudinal fracture of petrous bone and fracture of temporal bone can cause facial nerve compression.

=== Birth injury ===
Use of forceps during the delivery can cause trauma to facial nerve. Compression of the diploic bone of the infant’s rudimentary mastoid process can compress facial nerve.

=== Suppurative otitis media ===
Edema and inflammation caused by this condition affect the facial (fallopian) canal and causes compression of facial nerve

=== Parotid swelling ===
Abscess and tumours of parotid gland can cause compression of motor part of the facial nerve resulting in facial palsy.

=== Tumours ===
Tumour of facial nerve like schwannomas and perineuriomas. Other tumours that can compress facial nerve along its course like congenital cholesteatomas, hemangiomas, acoustic neuromas, parotid gland neoplasms, or metastases of other tumors.

- Other causes like viral, bacterial or fungal infections like chicken pox, streptococcal infection or candidiasis etc.

== Tests ==
There are several medical tests to know that if the decompression surgery is needed or not and tests also shows the degree of injury.

=== Galvanic stimulation ===
In this test there is direct current applied to the stylomastoid foramen and assess with visual response. No longer used and do not predict prognosis.

==== Nerve excitability test ====
In this test electrodes are situated over the main trunk and nerve is stimulated until the visual response is seen from the normal side and same is done for the diseased side. Then difference between the current required to produce response is measured. If it is more than 3.5mA then it suggests the axonal degeneration. If it is more than 20 mA then it suggests immediate decompression surgery.

==== Maximal stimulation test ====
In this test increasing electric stimulation to nerve is given until the facial twitch is seen then it is repeated to affected side. Difference between both sides are measured as equal, lesser or no response. It is very painful exam.

=== Electroneurography ===
In this test electrodes are placed over the main trunk then suprathreshold stimulus is given and muscle action potential is measured over the both side.

=== Electromyography ===
In this test electrodes are directly placed in muscles and compound action potential of muscles is measured.

=== Voluntary EMG ===
Useful in identifying a false positive Electroneurography. Presence of compound muscle action potential on voluntary EMG is a sign of good prognosis.

== Indications and contraindications ==
Indications include:

- More than 90% difference between the affected side and the normal side in Electroneurography.
- Complete facial nerve paralysis.
- Absence of voluntary compound muscle action potential in voluntary electromyography.
- Progressive deafness and vertigo.
- Presentation within 14 days of onset of complete paralysis.
- Patient desires operative intervention.

Contraindications include:

- When the motor endplate muscle unit is no longer functional cause this occurs after long-standing paralysis in which fibrosis develops with the atrophy of facial muscles.
- In elderly patient because regeneration of nerve is slow in old age.

Individuals with Bell's palsy or Ramsey hunt syndrome may benefit from facial nerve decompression, but this is controversial.

== Procedure ==
The aim of decompression surgery is to open the affected area and nerve sheath, and to release pressure. This reduces compression on the nerve fibers, improves blood circulation and minimizes damage to distal nerve fibers.

Several surgical approaches are described to achieve decompression:

- Middle cranial fossa approach
- Translabarynthine approach

"Total decompression" can also be carried out via combination of all the above.

== Transtemporal (middle cranial fossa) Approach ==
Internal auditory canal (I.A.C.) porous to tympanic segment.

This middle cranial fossae exposure is used to expose I.A.C. and labyrinthine segment of the facial nerve when hearing preservation is goal. The geniculate ganglion and tympanic portion of the nerve can also be decompressed from this approach.

=== Indication ===
The middle cranial fossa route is the only method that can be used to expose the entire I.A.C. and labyrinthine segment with preservation of hearing. This is combination with the retrolabyrinthine and transmastoid approaches, enables visualization of the entire course of the facial nerve and still preserves function of the inner ear. The middle cranial fossa technique is most commonly used for the decompression of the facial nerve in Bell's palsy and longitudinal temporal bone fracture. This approach may be useful in the management of patient with schwannomas of cranial nerve 7 and 8, as well as with patient with melkersson-rosenthal syndrome.

=== Complication ===
- Post-operative sensory and conductive hearing loss.
- Post-operative meningitis, temporal lobe oedema, epidural hematoma.
- Uncontrolled bleeding or injury to I.A.C. is most serious complication during surgery.

== Translabyrinthine approach ==
=== Procedure ===
For patient with total hearing loss, translabyrinthine approach was made with a skin incision from mastoid apex to the scalp going posterior for 5–6 cm;then it was turned anterior again, toward the top of auricle parallel to lower incision. Temporalis muscles incision followed the skin incision and standard translabyrinthine approach was completed by decompressing the facial nerve totally from stylomastoid foramen to the I.A.C.

== Indication for surgery ==
(Vestibular Scwannnoma), Vestibular Nerve Section, Vascular Compression, Meningioma, Skull Base Fracture, Facial Nerve Decompression, Superior Semicircular Canal Dehiscence, Skull Base Tumors, Aneurysms, Cholesterol Granulomma

=== Complication ===
CSF leakage and meningitis, headache, intracranial vascular complication, facial nerve injury, injury to the other cranial nerve, disordered vestibular compensation.
