= Digastric branch of facial nerve =

Nerve of the digastric muscle

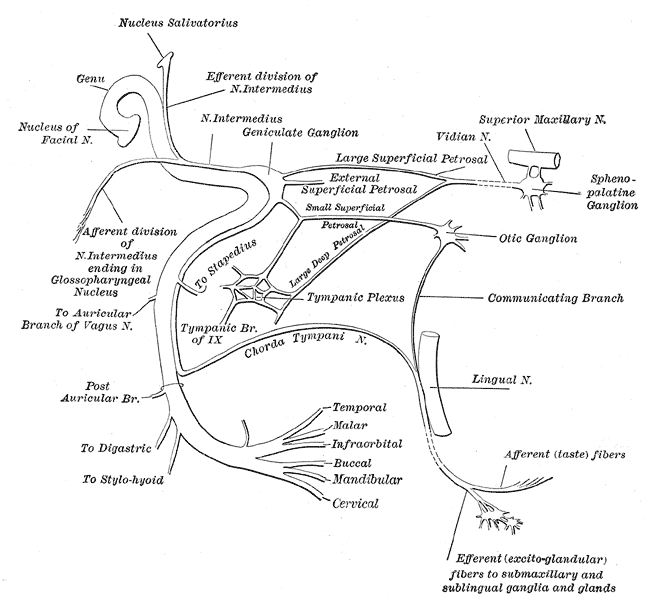
- Plan of the facial and intermediate nerves and their communication with other nerves. ("To digastric" labeled at bottom left.)

Details
- From: Facial nerve
- Innervates: Posterior belly of digastric muscle

Identifiers
- Latin: ramus digastricus nervi facialis
- TA98: A14.2.01.105
- TA2: 6298
- FMA: 53288

The digastric branch of facial nerve provides motor innervation to the posterior belly of the digastric muscle. It branches from the facial nerve (CN VII) after it exits the stylomastoid foramen as CN VII exits the facial canal (it thus branches proximal to the parotid plexus of facial nerve). It commonly arises in common with the stylohyoid branch of facial nerve. It descends in the upper neck near the stylohyoid muscle. It is an important anatomical landmark in surgical approaches to the facial nerve and nearby structures in the upper neck.
