= Intermediate nerve =

Portion of the facial nerve

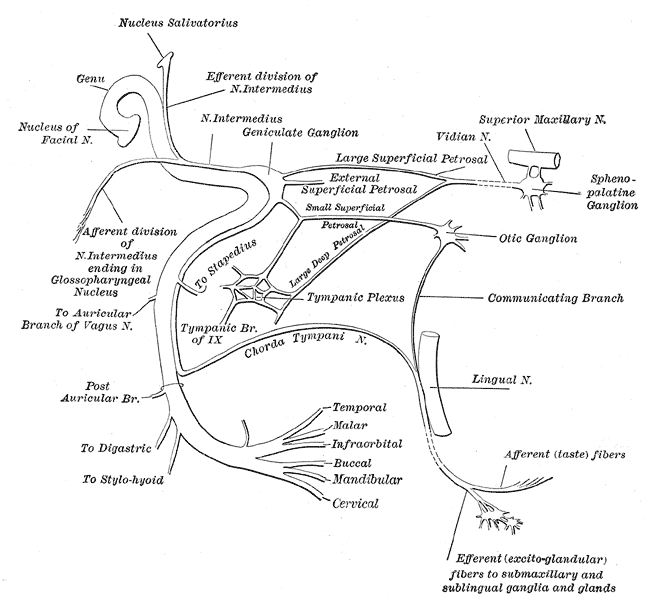
- Plan of the facial and intermediate nerves and their communication with other nerves. (N. intermedius labeled at upper left.)

Details

Identifiers
- Latin: nervus intermedius
- TA98: A14.2.01.115
- TA2: 6286
- FMA: 53410

The intermediate nerve, nervus intermedius, nerve of Wrisberg or glossopalatine nerve is the part of the facial nerve (cranial nerve VII) located between the motor component of the facial nerve and the vestibulocochlear nerve (cranial nerve VIII). It contains the sensory and parasympathetic fibers of the facial nerve. Upon reaching the facial canal, it joins with the motor root of the facial nerve at the geniculate ganglion.

== Parasympathetic fibers ==
The superior salivatory nucleus contains the cell bodies of parasympathetic axons within the intermediate nerve. These fibers reach the geniculate ganglion but do not synapse. Some of these preganglionic parasympathetic fibers persist within the greater petrosal nerve as they exit the geniculate ganglion and subsequently synapse with neurons in the pterygopalatine ganglion. These postganglionic neurons send axons that provide parasympathetic innervation to the lacrimal gland via a communicating branch from the zygomatic nerve to the lacrimal nerve of cranial nerve V.

The remaining preganglionic fibers continue as the mixed facial nerve proper as it extends through the facial canal. Before the nerve exits the skull via the stylomastoid foramen and after the nerve to the stapedius muscle has branched off, the facial nerve gives off the chorda tympani nerve. This nerve exits the skull through the petrotympanic fissure and merges with the lingual nerve, after which it synapses with neurons in the submandibular ganglion. These postganglionic neurons provide parasympathetic innervation to the submandibular and sublingual glands.

== Sensory fibers ==
The sensory component of the intermediate nerve carries input about sensation from the skin of the external auditory meatus, and taste from the anterior two-thirds of the tongue, floor of the mouth, and the soft palate. Taste sensation from the mucous membranes of the nasopharynx and palate is carried along the greater petrosal nerve, while the chorda tympani nerve (and lingual nerve) carries taste input from the anterior two-thirds of the tongue, floor of mouth, and soft palate.

The geniculate ganglion contains the cell bodies of the sensory component of the nervus intermedius. Nervus intermedius neuralgia is a pain syndrome associated with the nervus intermedius.
