= Meatus acusticus =

Meatus acusticus can refer to:

- Ear canal (meatus acusticus externus)
- Internal auditory meatus (meatus acusticus internus)
