= Geniculate ganglion =

Collection of facial nerve neurons

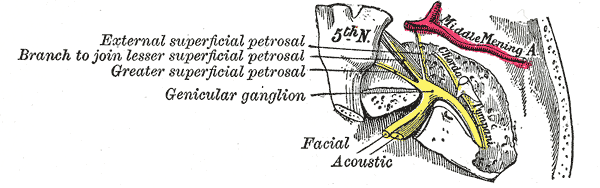
- The course and connections of the facial nerve in the temporal bone.

- Cranial nerves VII and VIII and selected structures of the inner and middle ear. 1 Nervus vestibularis, 2 Nervus cochlearis, 3 Nervus intermediofacialis, 4 Ganglion geniculi, 5 Chorda tympani, 6 Cochlea, 7 Ductus semicirculares, 8 Malleus, 9 Membrana tympani, 10 Tuba auditiva

Details
- Innervates: Lacrimal glands, submandibular glands, sublingual glands, tongue, palate, pharynx, external auditory meatus, stapedius muscle, posterior belly of the digastric muscle, stylohyoid muscle, muscles of facial expression

Identifiers
- Latin: ganglion geniculi nervi facialis
- MeSH: D005830
- TA98: A14.2.01.116
- TA2: 6287
- FMA: 53414

The geniculate ganglion (from Latin genu, for "knee") is a bilaterally paired special sense ganglion of the intermediate nerve component of the facial nerve (CN VII). It is situated within facial canal of the head.

It contains cell bodies of first-order unipolar sensory neurons which convey gustatory (taste) afferents from taste receptors of the anterior two-thirds of the tongue by way of the chorda tympani, and of the palate by way of the greater petrosal nerve, From the ganglion, the proximal fibres proceed to the gustatory (i.e. superior/rostral) part of the solitary nucleus where they synapse with second-order neurons.

== Anatomy ==
=== Structure ===
The geniculate ganglion is conical in shape. The greater petrosal nerve diverges from CNVII and the lesser petrosal nerve diverges from CN IX at the geniculate ganglion.

=== Relations ===
It is located close to the internal auditory meatus. It is covered superiorly by the petrous part of the temporal bone (which is sometimes absent over the ganglion).

== Clinical significance ==
The geniculate ganglion is an important surgical landmark near the internal auditory meatus.

=== Herpes zoster oticus ===
The geniculate ganglion may become inflamed due herpes zoster virus virus infection. Swelling of the ganglion may result in facial palsy (Ramsay Hunt syndrome). The syndrome presents with intense pain in one ear that is followed by a vesicular rash around the ear canal.

== Additional images ==
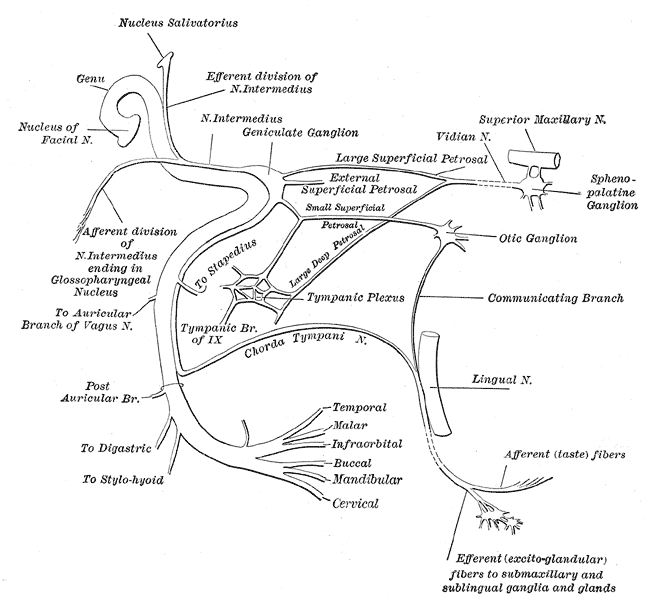
Plan of the facial and intermediate nerves and their communication with other nerves.

== See also ==
- Ramsay Hunt syndrome type II
