= Transverse muscle of the chin =

Facial muscle

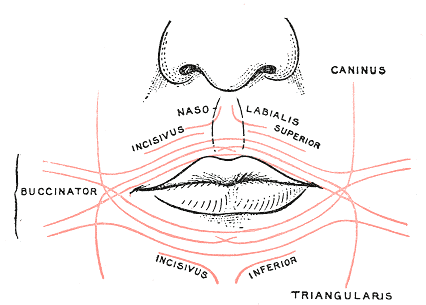
- Scheme showing arrangement of fibers of orbicularis oris. (Triangularis labeled at bottom right.)

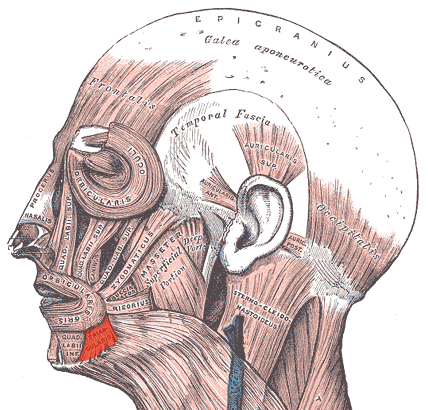
- Muscles of the head, face, and neck. (Labeled as triangularis near chin.)

Details
- Nerve: Facial nerve

Identifiers
- Latin: musculus transversus menti
- TA98: A04.1.03.027
- TA2: 2077
- FMA: 49080

The transversus menti, or transverse muscle of the chin, is a facial muscle that is often considered to be the superficial fibers of the depressor anguli oris muscle which cross to the other side of the face.
