= Parotid plexus =

Nerve branch point in the parotid gland

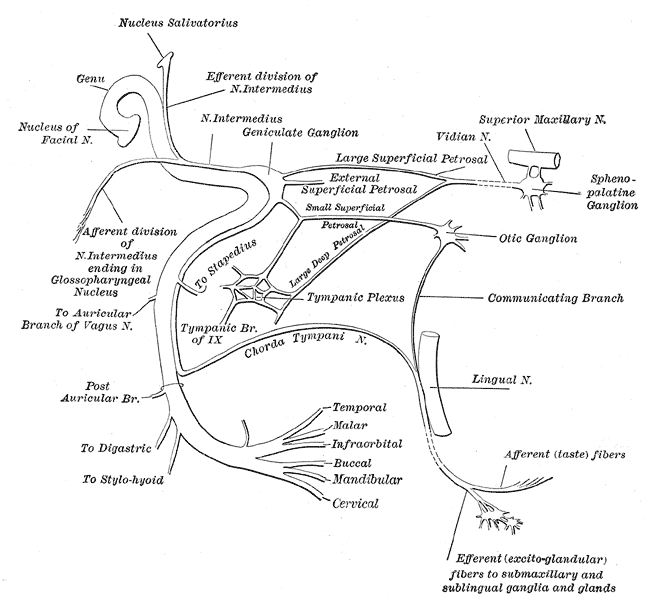
- Plan of the facial and intermediate nerves and their communication with other nerves. (Branches of facial nerve visible at bottom center.)

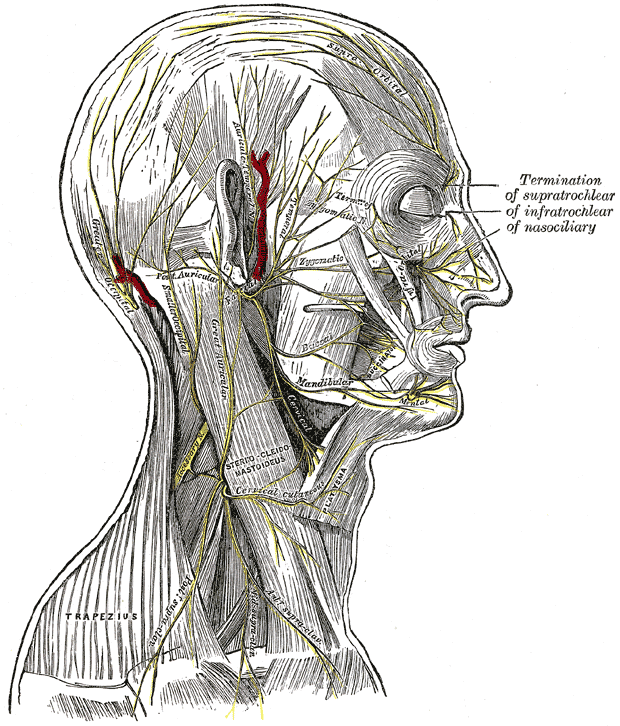
- The nerves of the scalp, face, and side of neck. (Parotid plexus not labeled, but visible near ear.)

Details

Identifiers
- Latin: plexus parotideus
- TA98: A14.2.01.108
- TA2: 6301
- FMA: 77530

The parotid plexus or pes anserinus is the branch point of the facial nerve (extratemporal) after it leaves the stylomastoid foramen. This division takes place within the parotid gland.

== Branches ==
Commonly, it divides into the following branches (several variations):

1. The temporal branches, cross the zygomatic arch to the temporal region.
2. The zygomatic branches, cross the zygomatic bone to the orbit.
3. The buccal branches, pass forward to below the orbit and around the mouth.
4. The marginal mandibular branch passes forward to the lower lip and chin.
5. The cervical branch runs forward forming a series of arches over the suprahyoid region to the platysma muscle.
