= Quadratus muscle =

Quadratus is Latin for square and quadratus muscle may refer to:

- Depressor labii inferioris muscle, also known as musculus quadratus labii inferioris
- Levator labii superioris muscle, also known as musculus quadratus labii superioris
- Pronator quadratus, a square shaped muscle on the distal forearm that acts to pronate (turn so the palm faces downwards) the hand
- Quadratus femoris muscle, a flat, quadrilateral skeletal muscle. Located on the posterior side of the hip joint
- Quadratus lumborum muscle, a muscle of the posterior abdominal wall
- Quadratus plantae muscle, a muscle in the foot
