= Quadratus labii =

Quadratus labii may refer to:

- Depressor labii inferioris muscle, also known by the Latin term quadratus labii inferioris
- Levator labii superioris, also known by the Latin term quadratus labii superioris
