= Acoustic meatus =

Acoustic meatus may refer to:

- Internal acoustic meatus, or internal auditory meatus, or internal auditory canal
- External acoustic meatus, or ear canal
