= Transverse cervical nerve =

Nerve of the neck

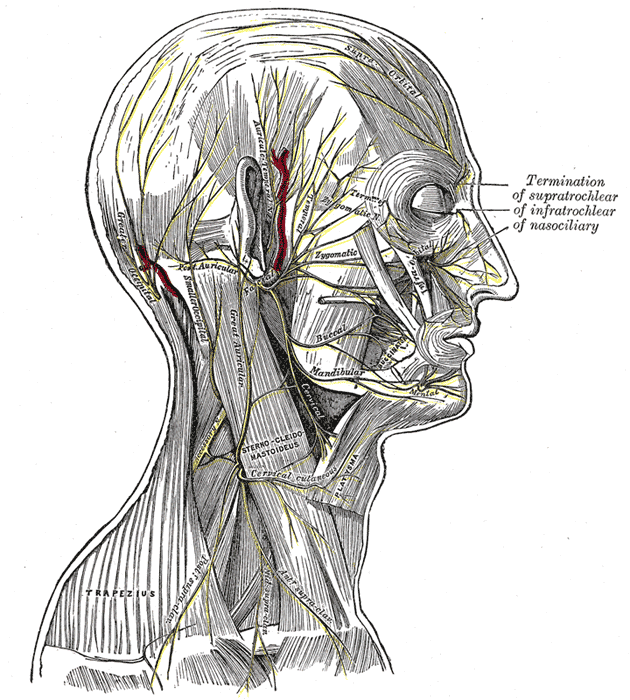
- The nerves of the scalp, face, and side of neck. ("Cervical cutaneous" identified at center.)

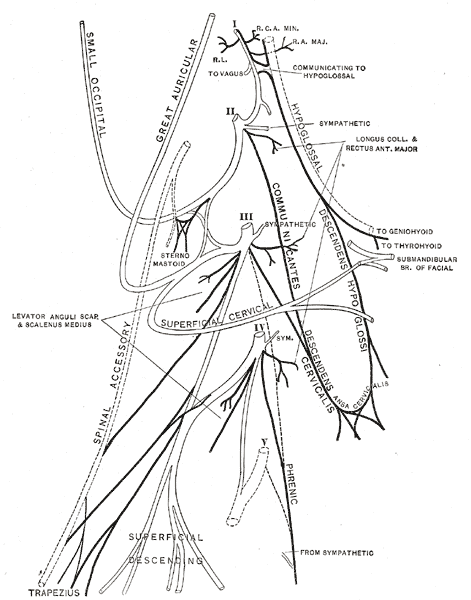
- Plan of the cervical plexus. ("Superficial cervical" labeled at center.)

Details
- From: Cervical plexus (C2 and C3)
- Innervates: Cutaneous innervation of the anterior and lateral parts of the neck

Identifiers
- Latin: nervus transversus colli
- TA98: A14.2.02.021
- TA2: 6388
- FMA: 6873

The transverse cervical nerve (superficial cervical or cutaneous cervical) is a cutaneous (sensory) nerve of the cervical plexus that arises from the second and third cervical spinal nerves (C2-C3). It curves around the posterior border of the sternocleidomastoideus muscle, then pierces the fascia of the neck before dividing into two branches. It provides sensory innervation to the front of the neck.

== Anatomy ==
=== Course and relations ===
It curves around the posterior border of the sternocleidomastoideus muscle about its middle, and, passing obliquely forward beneath the external jugular vein to the anterior border of the muscle, it perforates the deep cervical fascia before dividing into an ascending branch and a descending branch beneath the platysma. The ascending branch communicates with the cervical branch of the facial nerve.

==== Dissection ====
During dissection, the sternocleidomastoid muscle is the landmark, with the transverse cervical nerve passing horizontally over this muscle from Erb's point.

=== Distribution ===
The nerve provides sensory innervation to the skin of the anterior neck between the chin and the sternum.

== Additional images ==
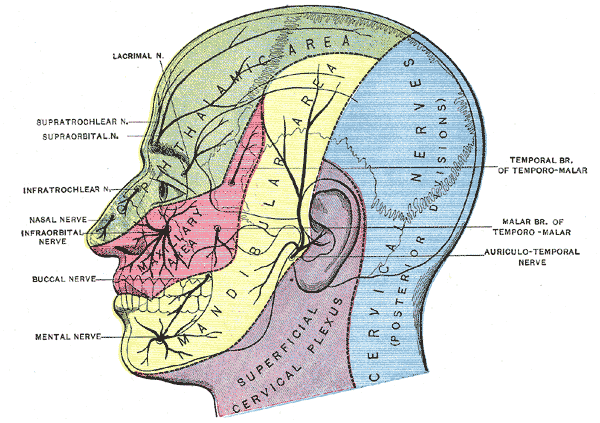
Dermatome distribution of the trigeminal nerve

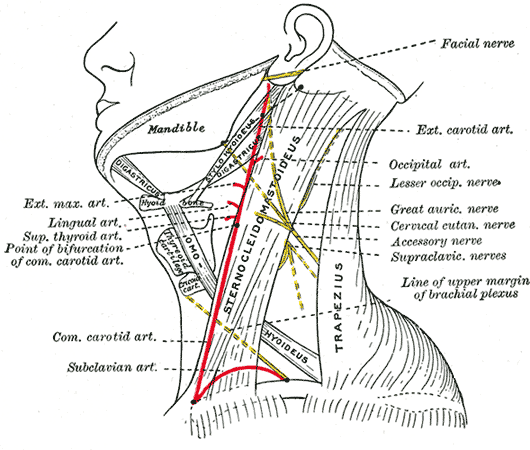
Side of neck, showing chief surface markings.
