= Depressor anguli oris muscle =

Facial muscle that depresses the corner of the mouth during frowning

Depressor anguli oris
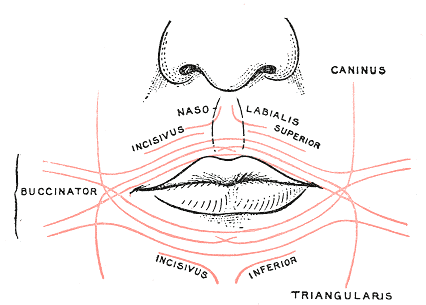
- Scheme showing arrangement of fibers of Orbicularis oris (triangularis labeled at bottom right).

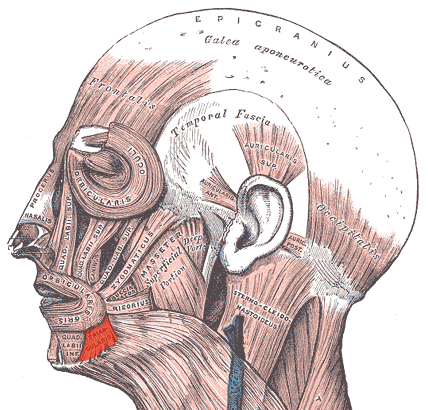
- Muscles of the head, face, and neck (labeled as triangularis near chin).

Details
- Origin: Tubercle of mandible
- Insertion: Modiolus of mouth
- Artery: Facial artery
- Nerve: Marginal mandibular branch of the facial nerve
- Actions: Depresses angle of mouth

Identifiers
- Latin: musculus depressor anguli oris
- TA98: A04.1.03.026
- TA2: 2076
- FMA: 46828

The depressor anguli oris muscle (triangularis muscle) is a facial muscle. It originates from the mandible and inserts into the angle of the mouth. It is associated with frowning, as it depresses the corner of the mouth.

== Structure ==
The depressor anguli oris arises from the lateral surface of the mandible. Its fibers then converge. It is inserted by a narrow fasciculus into the angle of the mouth. At its origin, it is continuous with the platysma muscle, and at its insertion with the orbicularis oris muscle and risorius muscle. Some of its fibers are directly continuous with those of the levator anguli oris muscle, and others are occasionally found crossing from the muscle of one side to that of the other; these latter fibers constitute the transverse muscle of the chin.

The depressor anguli oris muscle receives its blood supply from a branch of the facial artery.

=== Nerve supply ===
The depressor anguli oris muscle is supplied by the marginal mandibular branch of the facial nerve.

== Function ==
The depressor anguli oris muscle is a muscle of facial expression. It depresses the corner of the mouth, which is associated with frowning.

== Clinical significance ==
=== Paralysis ===
Damage to the marginal mandibular branch of the facial nerve may cause paralysis of the depressor anguli oris muscle. This may contribute to an asymmetrical smile. This may be corrected by resecting (cutting and removing) the depressor labii inferioris muscle, which has a more significant impact on smiling.

=== Hypoplasia/aplasia ===
Underdevelopment (hypoplasia) or complete absence (aplasia) of the depressor anguli oris can occur. Similarly to paralysis, individuals with these conditions will have an asymmetric smile. These conditions are rare, and develop at or before birth (congenitally).

== See also ==
- Facial muscles
- Transverse muscle of the chin

== Additional images ==
Position of depressor anguli oris muscle

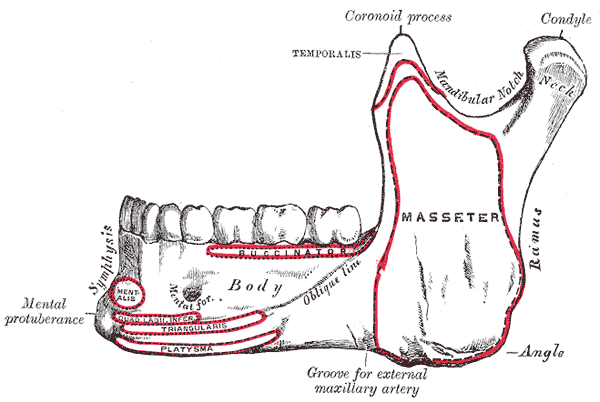
Mandible, outer surface, side view

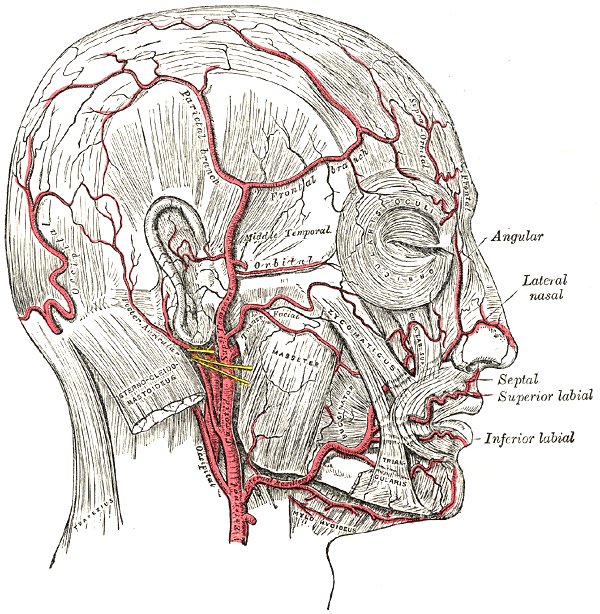
The arteries of the face and scalp
