= Chorda tympani =

Nerve carrying taste sensations

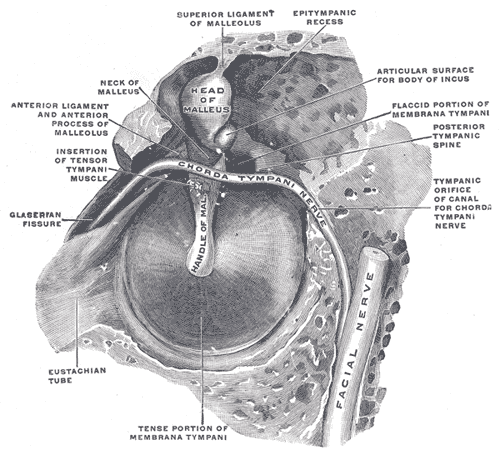
- The right tympanic membrane with the malleus and the chorda tympani, viewed from within the tympanic cavity (medial).

Details
- From: Facial nerve
- Innervates: Taste (anterior 2/3 of tongue) Submandibular gland Sublingual gland

Identifiers
- Latin: nervus chorda tympani
- MeSH: D002814
- TA98: A14.2.01.084; A14.2.01.118
- TA2: 6292
- FMA: 53228

Chorda tympani is a branch of the facial nerve that carries gustatory (taste) sensory innervation from the front of the tongue and parasympathetic (secretomotor) innervation to the submandibular and sublingual salivary glands.

Chorda tympani has a complex course from the brainstem, through the temporal bone and middle ear, into the infratemporal fossa, and ending in the oral cavity.

== Structure ==
Chorda tympani fibers emerge from the pons of the brainstem as part of the intermediate nerve of the facial nerve. The facial nerve exits the cranial cavity through the internal acoustic meatus and enters the facial canal. In the facial canal, the chorda tympani branches off the facial nerve and enters the lateral wall of the tympanic cavity inside the middle ear where it runs across the tympanic membrane (from posterior to anterior) and medial to the neck of the malleus.

The chorda then exits the skull by descending through the petrotympanic fissure into the infratemporal fossa just lateral to the styloid bone. Here it joins the lingual nerve, a branch of the mandibular nerve (CN V_{3}). Traveling with the lingual nerve, the fibers of chorda tympani enter the sublingual space to reach the anterior 2/3 of the tongue and submandibular ganglion.

- The preganglionic parasympathetic fibers originate in the superior salivary nucleus of the brainstem and project to the submandibular ganglion to synapse with postganglionic fibers which go on to innervate the submandibular and sublingual salivary glands.
- The special sensory fibers originate from the taste buds in the anterior 2/3 of the tongue and carry taste information to the nucleus of solitary tract of the brainstem, where taste information from facial, glossopharyngeal, and vagus nerves is integrated.

== Function ==
The chorda tympani carries two types of nerve fibers from their origin from the facial nerve to the lingual nerve that carries them to their destinations:

- Preganglionic parasympathetic fibers to the submandibular ganglion, providing secretomotor innervation to two salivary glands: the submandibular gland and sublingual gland and to the vessels of the tongue, which when stimulated, cause a dilation of blood vessels of the tongue.
- Special sensory fibers providing taste sensation from the anterior two-thirds of the tongue.

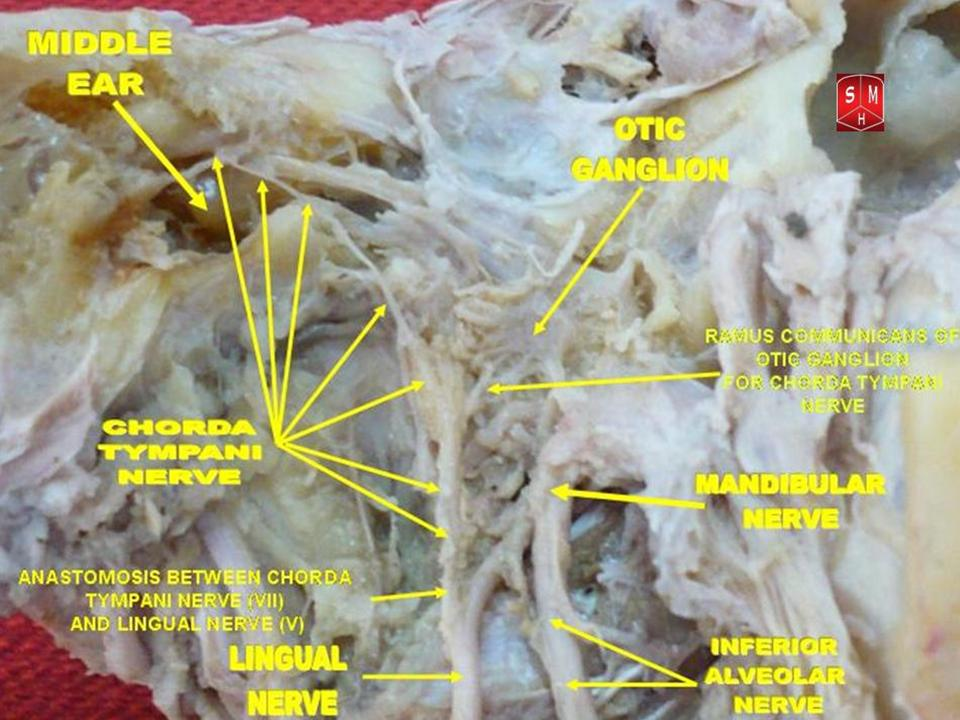
Right chorda tympani nerve, viewed from lateral side

=== Taste ===
The chorda tympani is one of three cranial nerves that are involved in taste. The taste system involves a complicated feedback loop, with each nerve acting to inhibit the signals of other nerves.

There are similarities between the tastes the chorda tympani picks up in sweeteners between mice and primates, but not rats. Relating research results to humans is therefore not always consistent. Sodium chloride is detected and recognized most by the chorda tympani nerve. The recognition and responses to sodium chloride in the chorda tympani is mediated by amiloride-sensitive sodium channels. The chorda tympani has a relatively low response to quinine and varied responses to hydrochloride. The chorda tympani is less responsive to sucrose than is the greater petrosal nerve.

=== Chorda tympani transection ===
The chorda tympani nerve carries its information to the nucleus of solitary tract, and shares this area with the greater petrosal, glossopharyngeal, and vagus nerves. When the greater petrosal and glossopharyngeal nerves are cut, regardless of age, the chorda tympani nerve takes over the space in the terminal field. This takeover of space by the chorda tympani is believed to be the nerve reverting to its original state before competition and pruning. The chorda tympani, as part of the peripheral nervous system, is not as plastic in early ages. In a study done by Hosley et al. and a study done by Sollars, it has been shown that when the nerve is cut at a young age, the related taste buds are not likely to grow back to full strength. In a bilateral transection of the chorda tympani in mice, the preference for sodium chloride increases compared to before the transection. Also avoidance of higher concentrations of sodium chloride is eliminated. The amiloride-sensitive channels responsible for salt recognition and response is functional in adult rats but not neonatal rats. This explains part of the change in preference of sodium chloride after a chorda tympani transection. The chorda tympani innervates the fungiform papillae on the tongue. According to a study done by Sollars et al. in 2002, when the chorda tympani has been transected early in postnatal development some of the fungiform papillae undergo a structural change to become more "filiform-like". When some of the other papillae grow back, they do so without a pore.

== Dysfunction ==
Injury to the chorda tympani nerve leads to loss or distortion of taste from anterior 2/3 of tongue. However, taste from the posterior 1/3 of tongue (supplied by the glossopharyngeal nerve) remains intact.

The chorda tympani appears to exert a particularly strong inhibitory influence on other taste nerves, as well as on pain fibers in the tongue. When the chorda tympani is damaged, its inhibitory function is disrupted, leading to less inhibited activity in the other nerves.

== Additional images ==
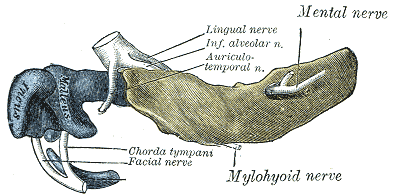
Mandible of human embryo 24 mm. long. Outer aspect.

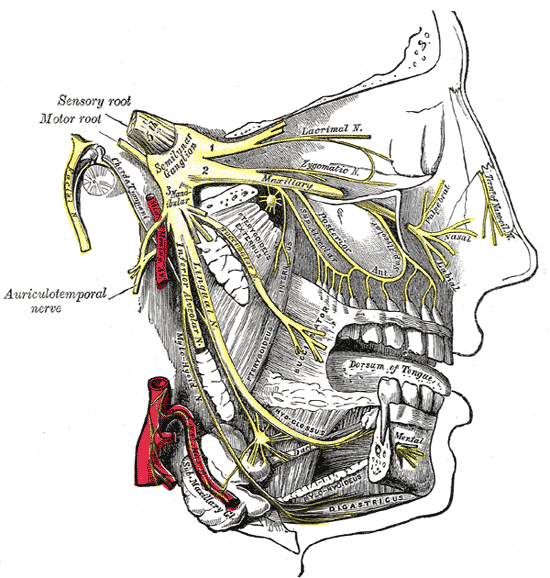
Distribution of the maxillary and mandibular nerves, and the submaxillary ganglion.

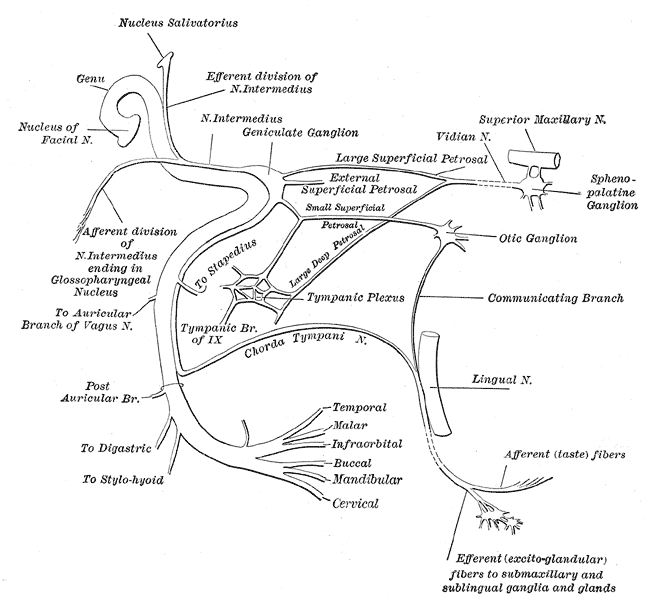
Plan of the facial and intermediate nerves and their communication with other nerves.

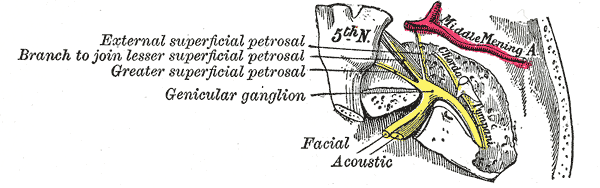
The course and connections of the facial nerve in the temporal bone.

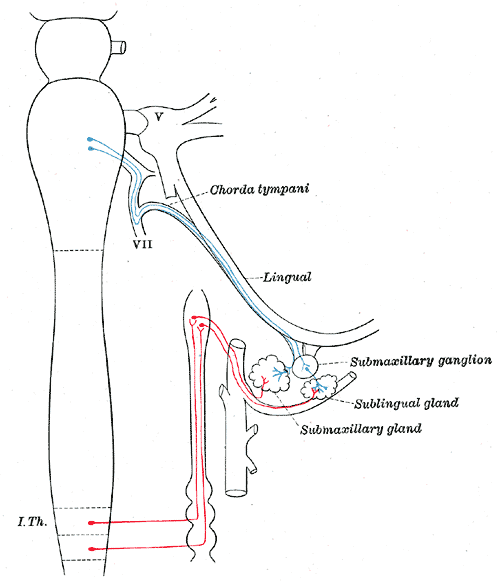
Sympathetic connections of the submaxillary and superior cervical ganglia.

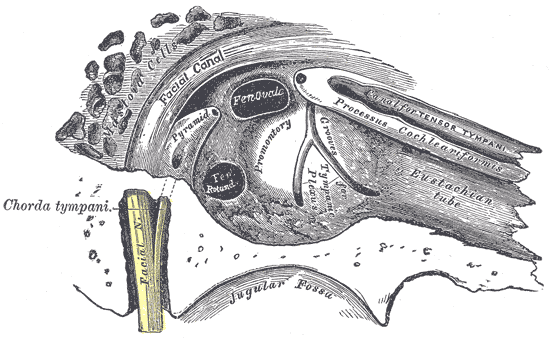
View of the inner wall of the tympanum (enlarged.)

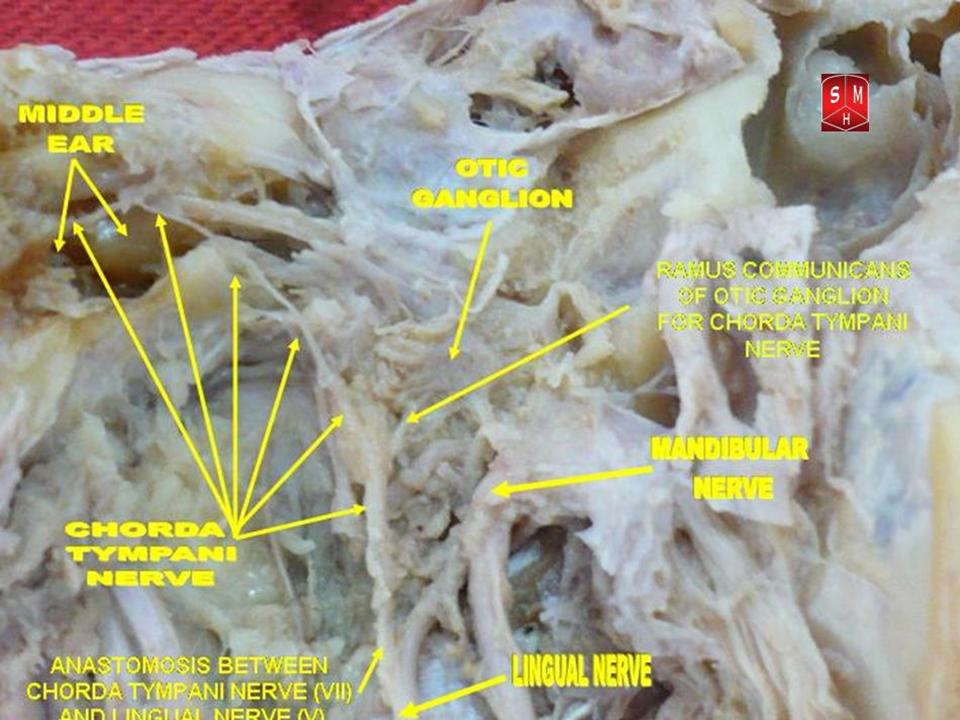
Dissection of chorda tympani nerve

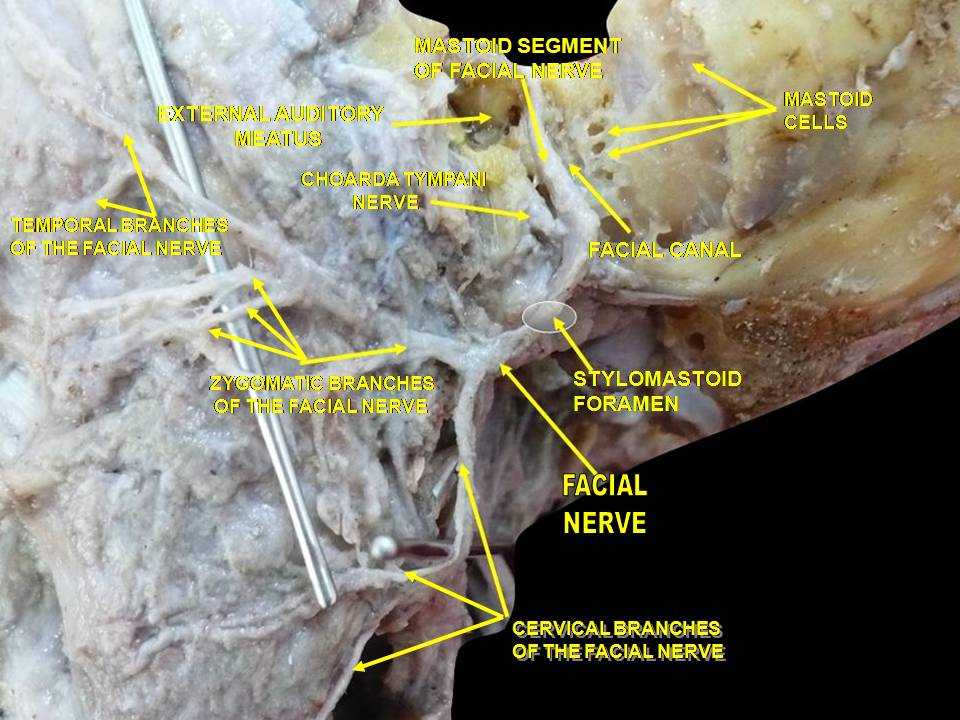
Lateral head anatomy detail. Facial nerve dissection.
