= Marginal mandibular branch of the facial nerve =

Nerve of the lower lip and chin

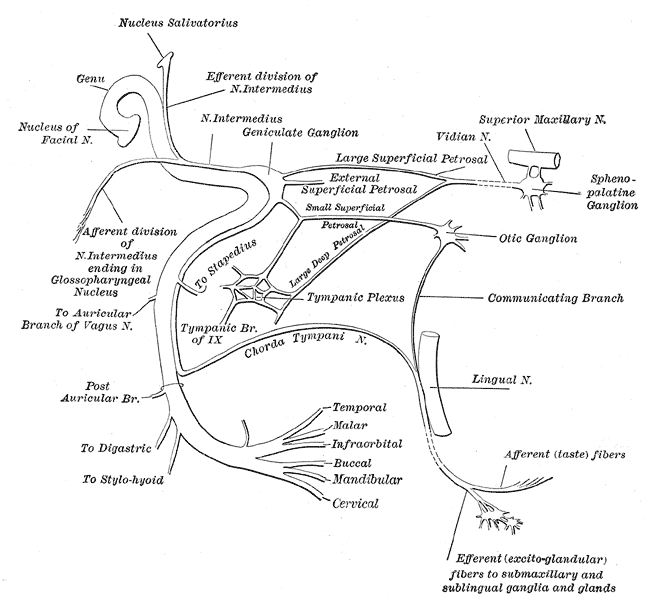
- Plan of the facial and intermediate nerves and their communication with other nerves. (Labeled at center bottom, second from bottom, as "Mandibular".)

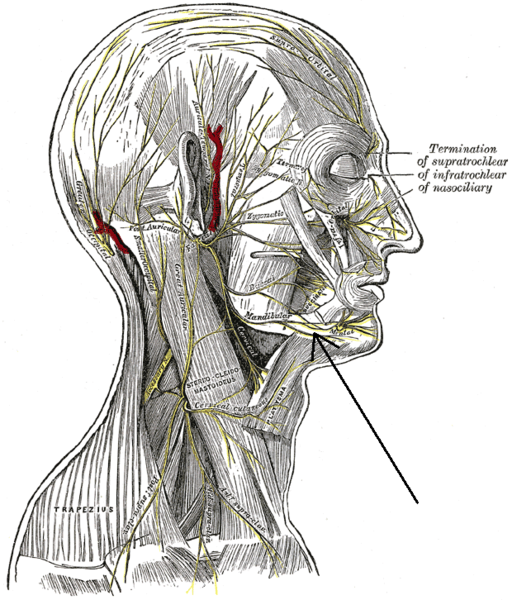
- The nerves of the scalp, face, and side of neck.

Details
- From: Facial nerve

Identifiers
- Latin: ramus marginalis mandibularis nervi facialis
- TA98: A14.2.01.113
- TA2: 6305
- FMA: 53365

The marginal mandibular branch of the facial nerve arises from the facial nerve (CN VII) in the parotid gland at the parotid plexus. It passes anterior-ward deep to the platysma and depressor anguli oris muscles. It provides motor innervation to muscles of the lower lip and chin: the depressor labii inferioris muscle, depressor anguli oris muscle, and mentalis muscle. It communicates with the mental branch of the inferior alveolar nerve.

== Clinical significance ==
=== Iatrogenic damage ===
The marginal mandibular nerve may be injured during surgery in the neck region, especially during excision of the submandibular salivary gland or during neck dissections due to lack of accurate knowledge of variations in the course, branches and relations. An injury to this nerve during a surgical procedure can distort the expression of the smile as well as other facial expressions. The marginal mandibular branch of the facial nerve is found superficial to the facial artery and (anterior) facial vein. Thus the facial artery can be used as an important landmark in locating the marginal mandibular nerve during surgical procedures. Damage can cause paralysis of the three muscles it supplies, which can cause an asymmetrical smile due to lack of contraction of the depressor labii inferioris muscle. This may be corrected with resection of the muscle, which tends to be successful.

== Additional images ==
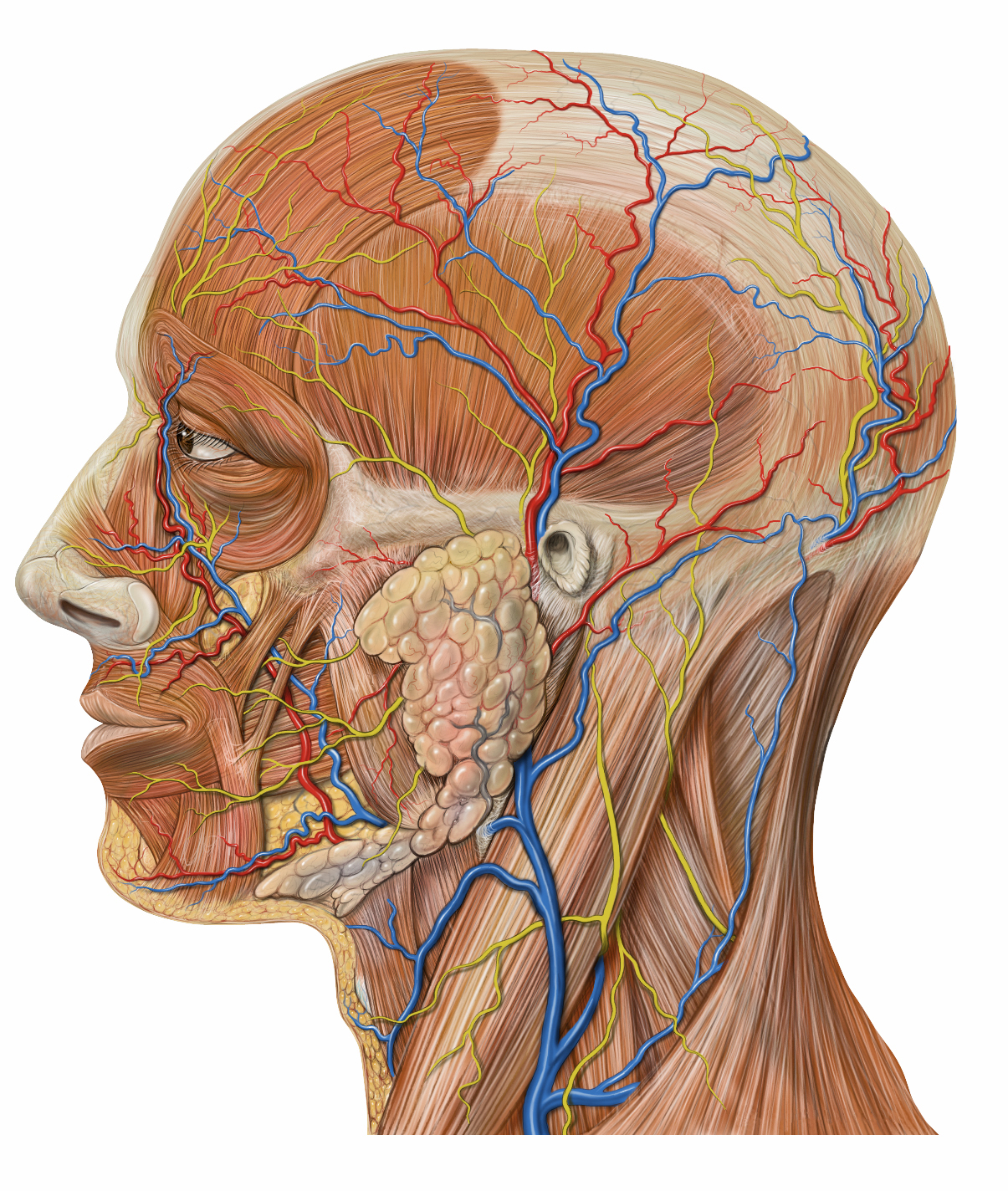
Lateral head anatomy detail

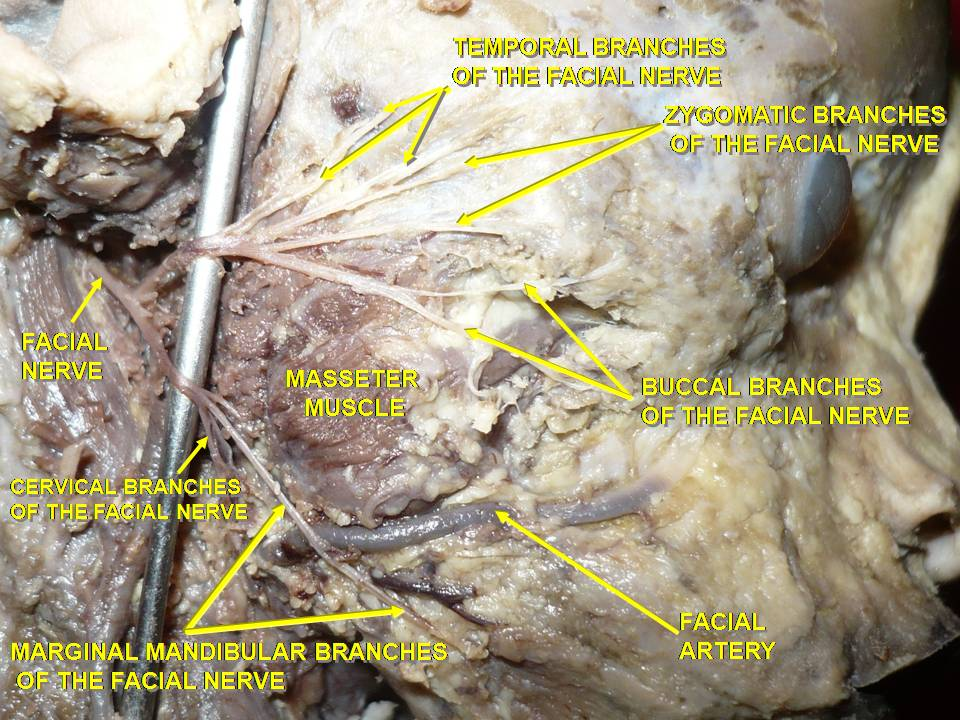
Lateral head anatomy detail. Neonatal dissection.
