= Stylohyoid branch of facial nerve =

Human facial nerve branch

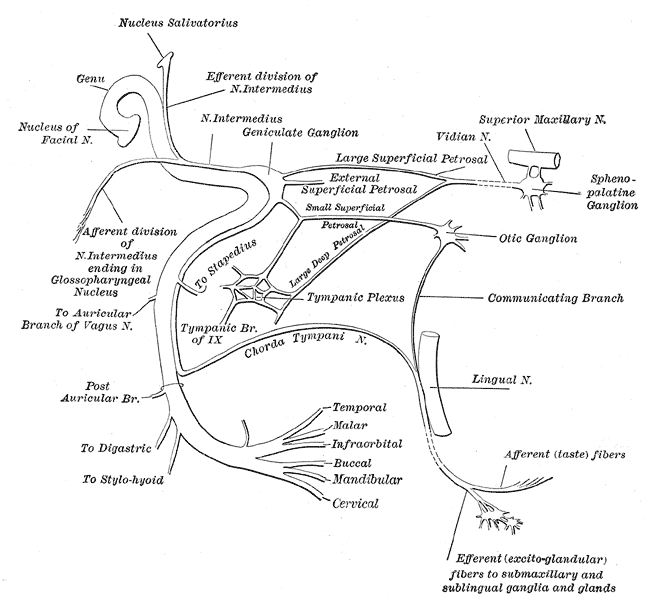
- Plan of the facial and intermediate nerves and their communication with other nerves. ("To stylohyoid" labeled at bottom left.)

Details
- From: Facial nerve

Identifiers
- Latin: ramus stylohyoideus nervi facialis
- TA98: A14.2.01.106
- TA2: 6299
- FMA: 53298

The stylohyoid branch of facial nerve provides motor innervation to the stylohyoid muscle. It frequently arises from the facial nerve (CN VII) in common with the digastric branch of facial nerve.

It is long and slender. It enters the stylohyoid muscle at the middle portion of the muscle.
