= Lingual nerve =

Human nerve relaying sense to the tongue

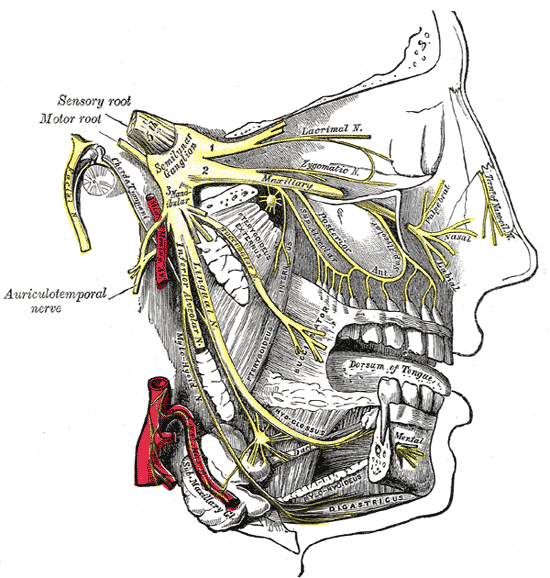
- Distribution of the maxillary and mandibular nerves, and the submaxillary ganglion.

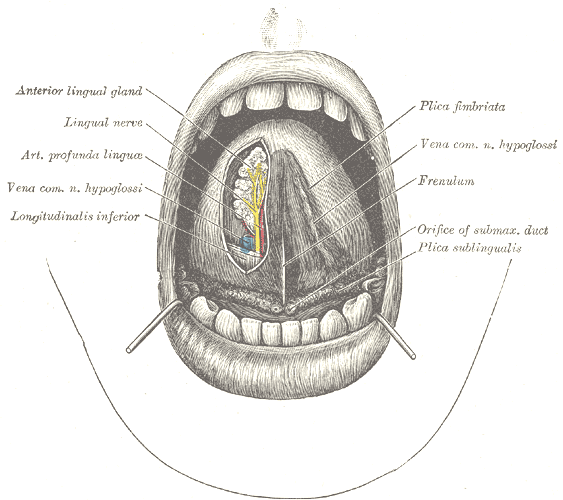
- The mouth cavity. The apex of the tongue is turned upward, and on the right side a superficial dissection of its under surface has been made.

Details
- From: Mandibular nerve
- Innervates: Tongue

Identifiers
- Latin: nervus lingualis
- MeSH: D008036
- TA98: A14.2.01.081
- TA2: 6267
- FMA: 53218

The lingual nerve carries sensory innervation from the anterior two-thirds of the tongue. It contains fibres from both the mandibular division of the trigeminal nerve (CN V_{3}) and from the facial nerve (CN VII). The fibres from the trigeminal nerve are for touch, pain and temperature (general sensation), and the ones from the facial nerve are for taste (special sensation).

== Structure ==
=== Origin ===
The lingual nerve arises from the posterior trunk of mandibular nerve (CN V_{3}) within the infratemporal fossa.

=== Course ===
The lingual nerve first courses deep to the lateral pterygoid muscle and superior to the tensor veli palatini muscle; while passing between these two muscle, it is joined by the chorda tympani, and often by a communicating branch from the inferior alveolar nerve.

The nerve then comes to pass inferoanteriorly upon the medial pterygoid muscle towards the medial aspect of the ramus of mandible, eventually meeting the mandible at the junction of the ramus and body of mandible. Here, the lingual nerve is anterior and somewhat medial (deep) to the inferior alveolar nerve.

It crosses obliquely to the side of the tongue beneath the constrictor pharyngis superior and styloglossus, and then between the hyoglossus and deep part of the submandibular gland; it finally runs from laterally to medially inferiorly crossing the duct of the submandibular gland, and along the tongue to its tip becoming the sublingual nerve, lying immediately beneath the mucous membrane.

The submandibular ganglion is suspended by two nerve filaments from the lingual nerve.

=== Distribution ===
==== General sensory ====
The lingual nerve supplies general somatic afferent (i.e. general sensory) innervation to the mucous membrane of the anterior two-thirds of the tongue (i.e. body of tongue) (whereas the posterior one-third (i.e. root of tongue) is innervated via the glossopharyngeal nerve (CN IX)), the floor of the oral cavity, and the mandibular/inferior lingual gingiva.

==== Special sensory and parasymathetic autonomic ====
The lingual nerve also comes to convey fibres of the chorda tympani (which are derived from the facial nerve (CN VII)), which provide special sensation (taste) to the anterior two-thirds of the tongue as well as parasympathetic and sympathetic innervation.

== Clinical significance ==
=== Lingual nerve injuries ===
The most common cause of lingual nerve injuries is third molar (wisdom tooth) surgery, less commonly the lingual nerve can be injured by local anaesthetic dental injections (particularly inferior dental block injections) and sublingual or submandibular surgery.

Any injury to sensory nerves can result in pain, altered sensation and/or numbness, but usually a combination of all three symptoms arises. This can have a significant negative effect on the patient's quality of life affecting their daily function and psychological health.

Patients should be routinely warned about lingual nerve injuries prior to wisdom tooth and floor of mouth surgery. The risk associated with wisdom tooth surgery is commonly accepted to be 2% temporary and 0.2% permanent.

Warning patients of nerve injury prior to administration of deep dental injections has a risk of injury in approximately 1:14,000 with 25% of these remaining persistent. Preoperative warning about these injuries is routinely undertaken in the US and Germany. This reflects good practice recommended by the Royal College of Anaesthetists (prior warning of potential nerve injury in relation to spinal and epidural blocks 1 on 24–57,000 risk).

Infiltration dentistry is a technique that may reduce the possibility of lingual nerve injuries by avoiding deep injections.

Avoiding lingual access when undertaking wisdom tooth surgery will also avoid unnecessary lingual nerve injury

== See also ==
- Lingual branches of hypoglossal nerve

== Additional images ==
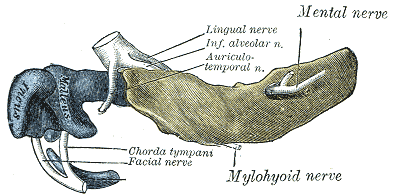
Mandible of human embryo 24 mm. long. Outer aspect.

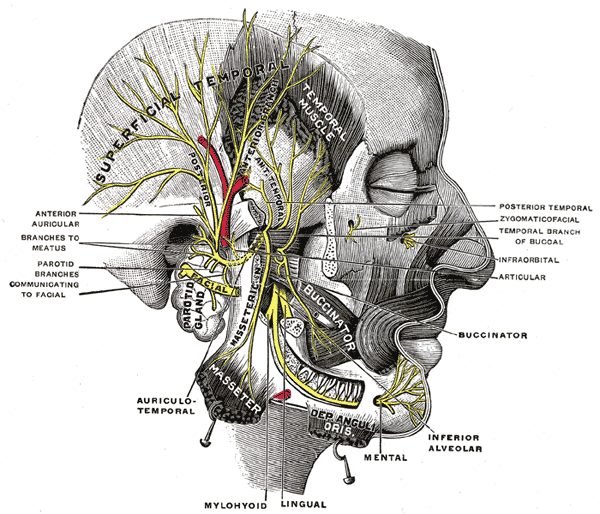
Mandibular division of the trifacial nerve.

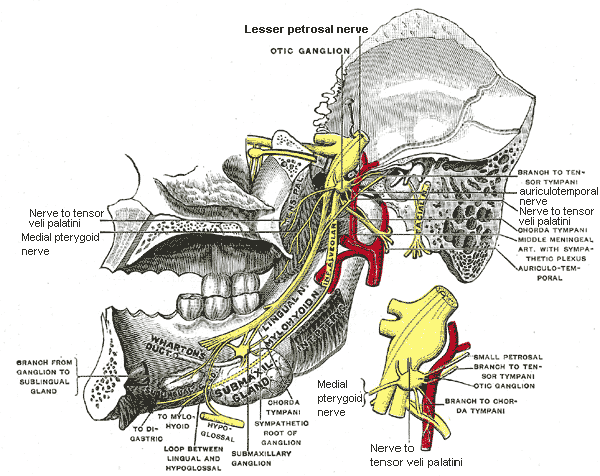
Mandibular division of trifacial nerve, seen from the middle line.

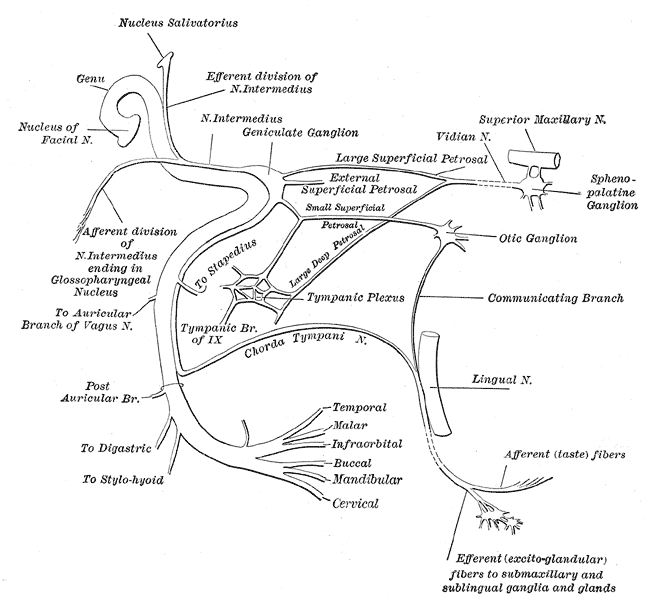
Plan of the facial and intermediate nerves and their communication with other nerves.

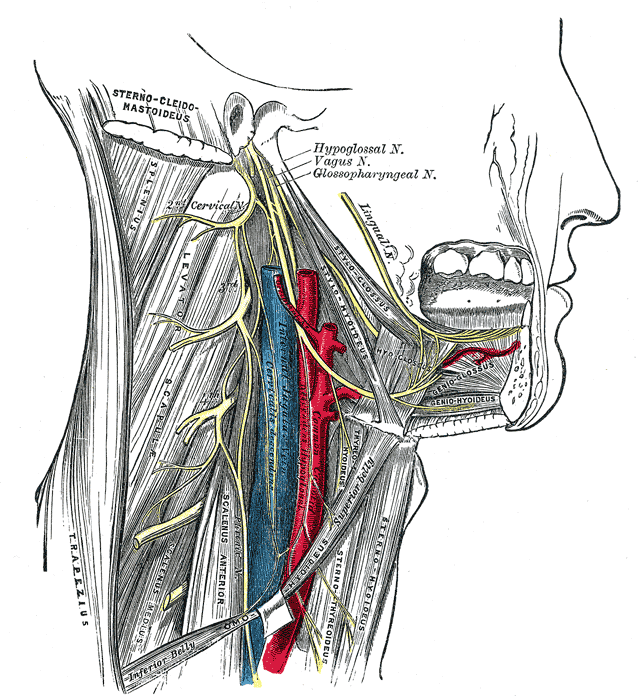
Hypoglossal nerve, cervical plexus, and their branches.

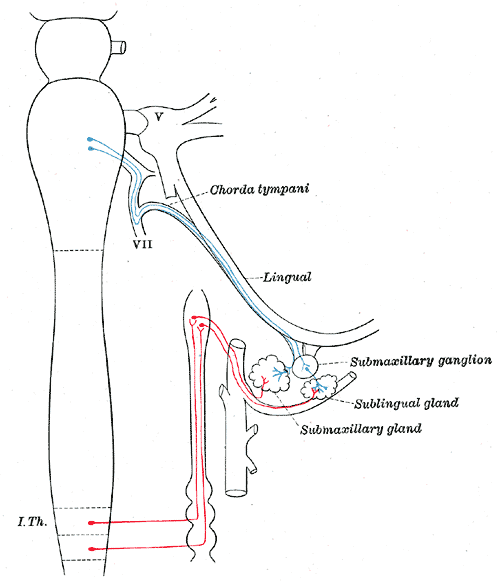
Sympathetic connections of the submaxillary and superior cervical ganglia.

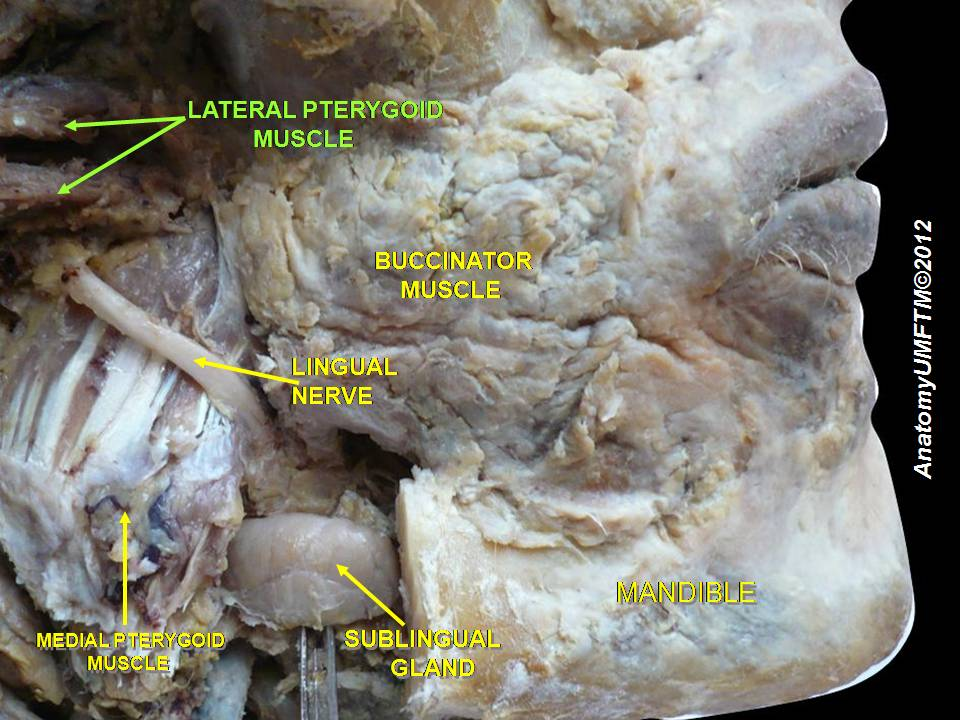
Lingual nerve

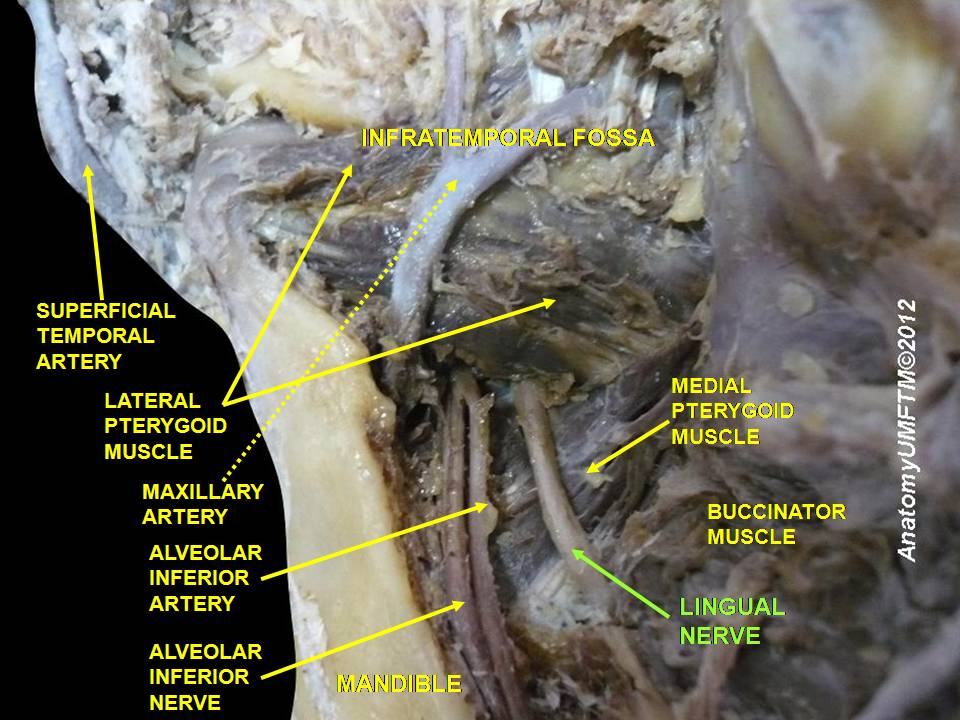
Lingual nerve

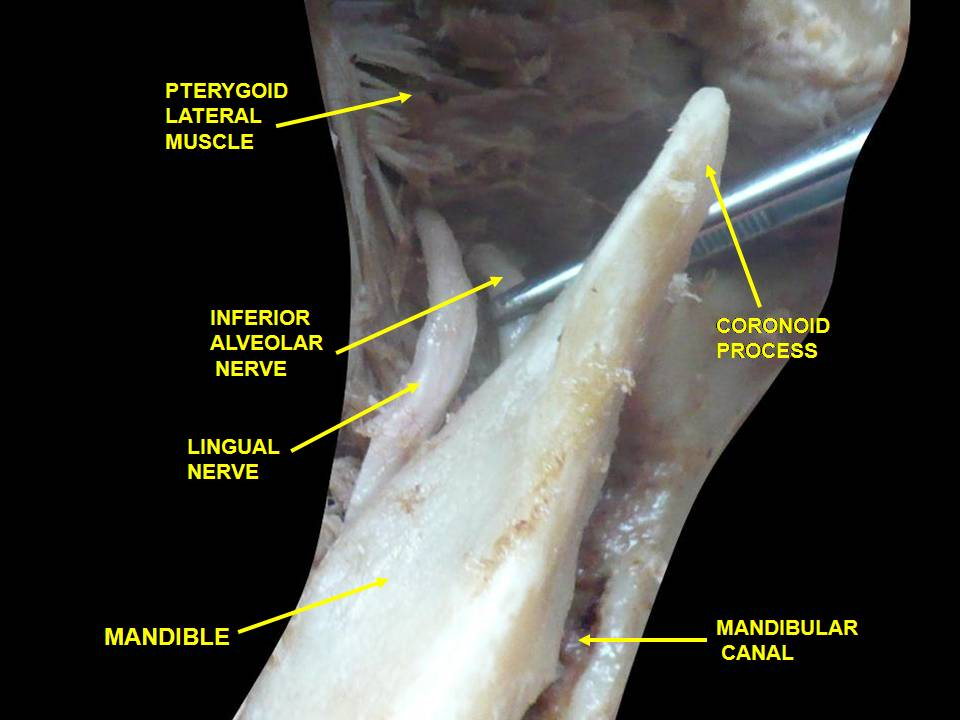
Mandibular nerve and bone. Deep dissection. Anterior view.

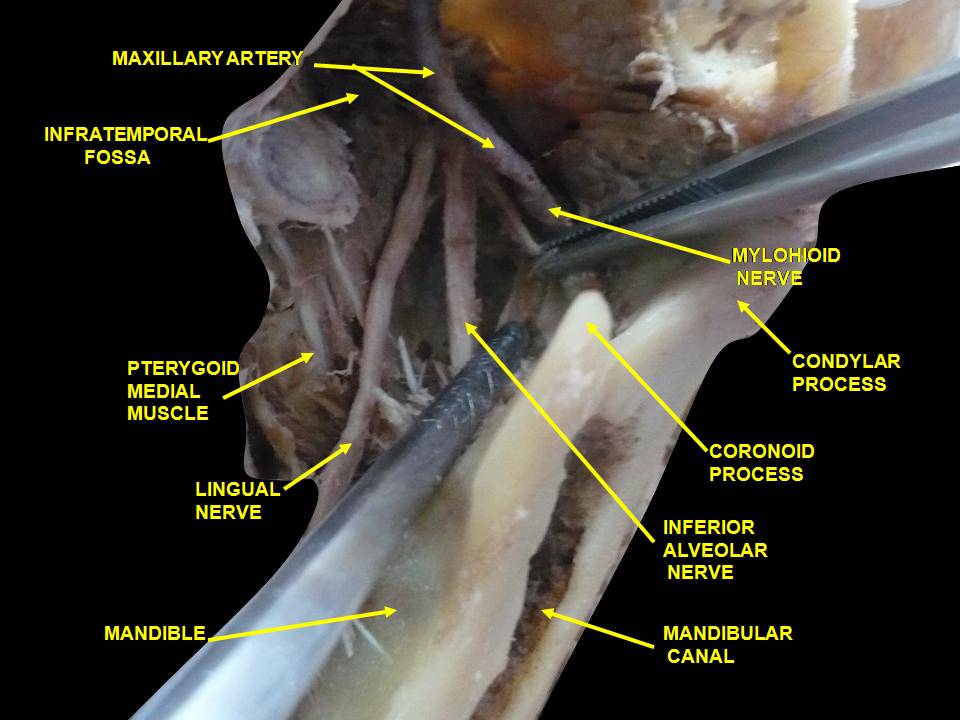
Infratemporal fossa. Lingual and inferior alveolar nerve. Deep dissection. Anterolateral view
