= Cervical branch of the facial nerve =

Branch of the facial nerve in the neck

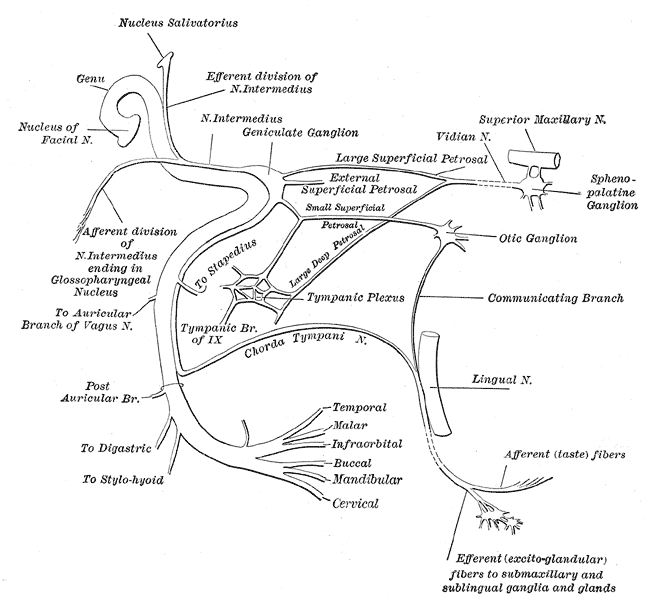
- Plan of the facial and intermediate nerves and their communication with other nerves. (Labeled at center bottom, as "Cervical".)

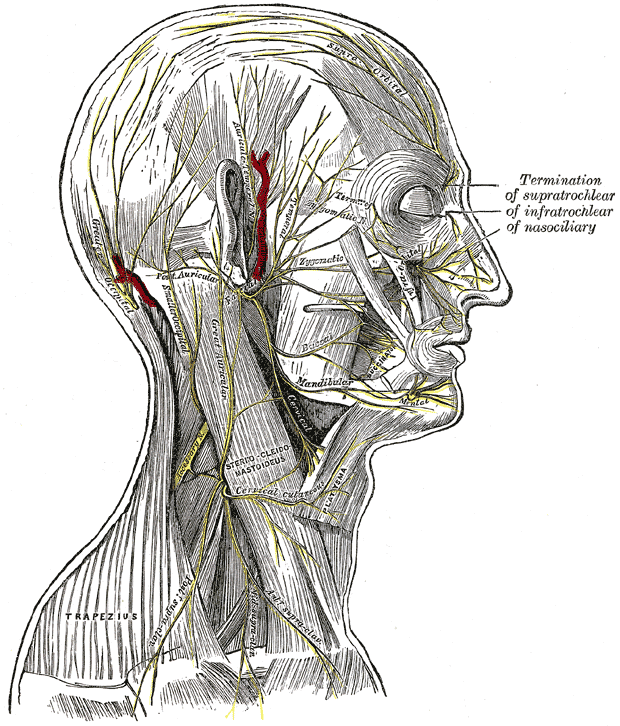
- The nerves of the scalp, face, and side of neck. (Cervical labeled at center, in dark region under jaw.)

Details
- From: Facial nerve
- Innervates: Platysma muscle

Identifiers
- Latin: ramus colli nervi facialis
- TA98: A14.2.01.114
- TA2: 6306
- FMA: 53396

The cervical branch of the facial nerve is a nerve in the neck. It is a branch of the facial nerve (VII). It supplies the platysma muscle, among other functions.

== Structure ==
The cervical branch of the facial nerve is a branch of the facial nerve (VII). It runs forward beneath the platysma muscle, and forms a series of arches across the side of the neck over the suprahyoid region. One branch descends to join the cervical cutaneous nerve from the cervical plexus.

== Function ==
The lateral part of the cervical branch of the facial nerve supplies the platysma muscle.

== Additional images ==
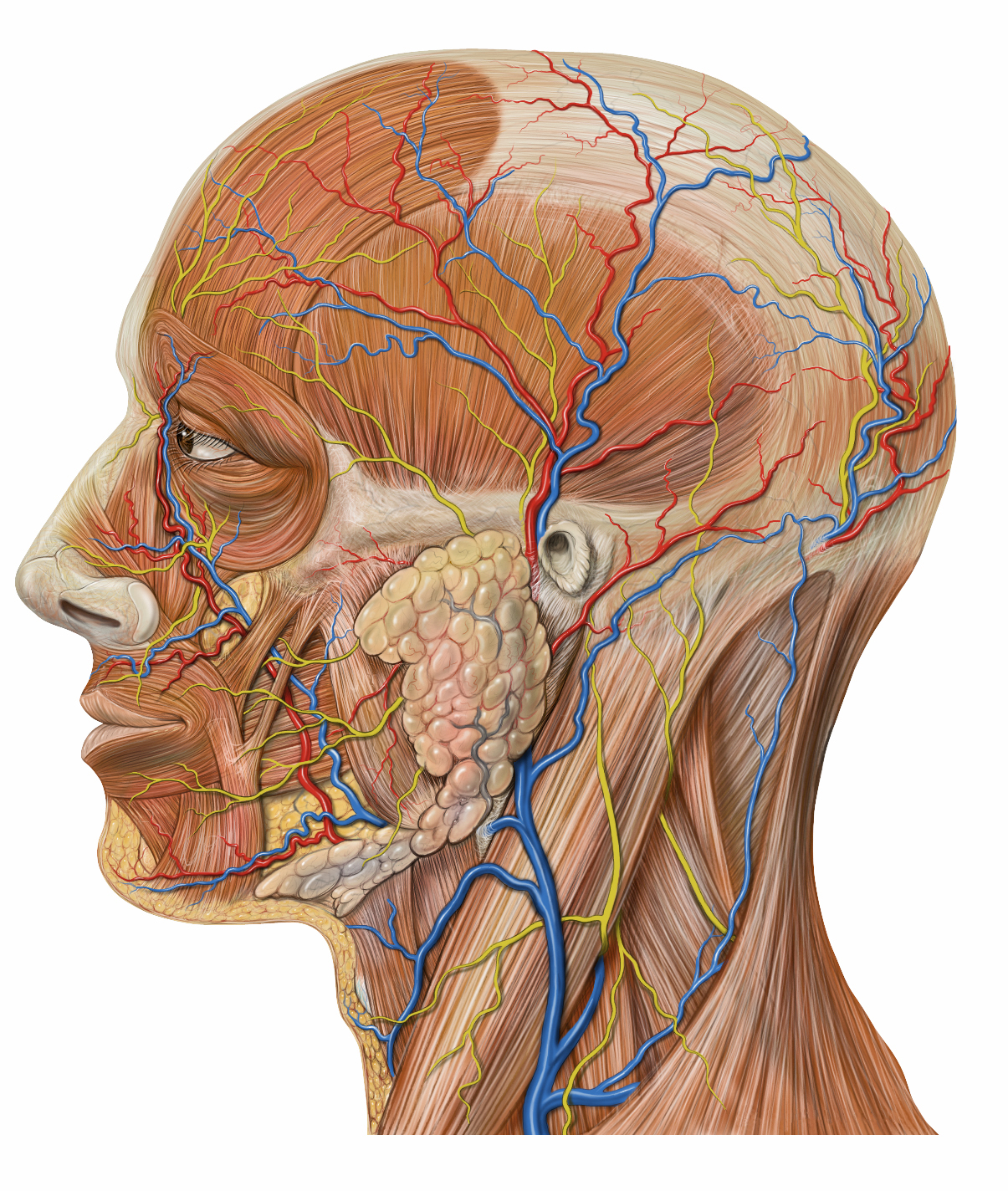
Lateral head anatomy detail

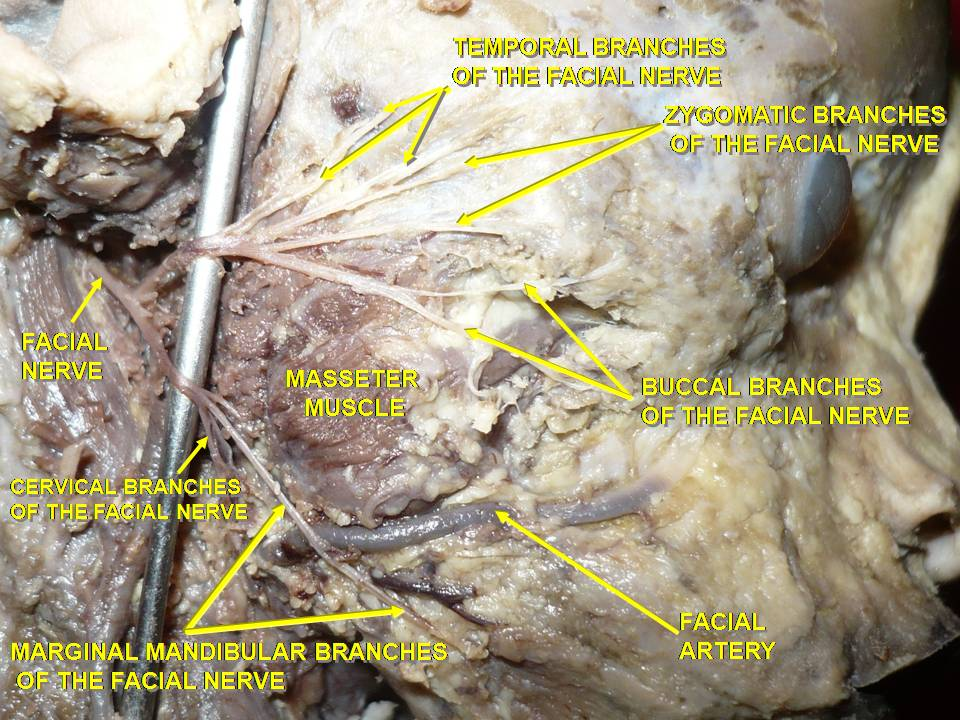
Lateral head anatomy detail. Dissection the newborn

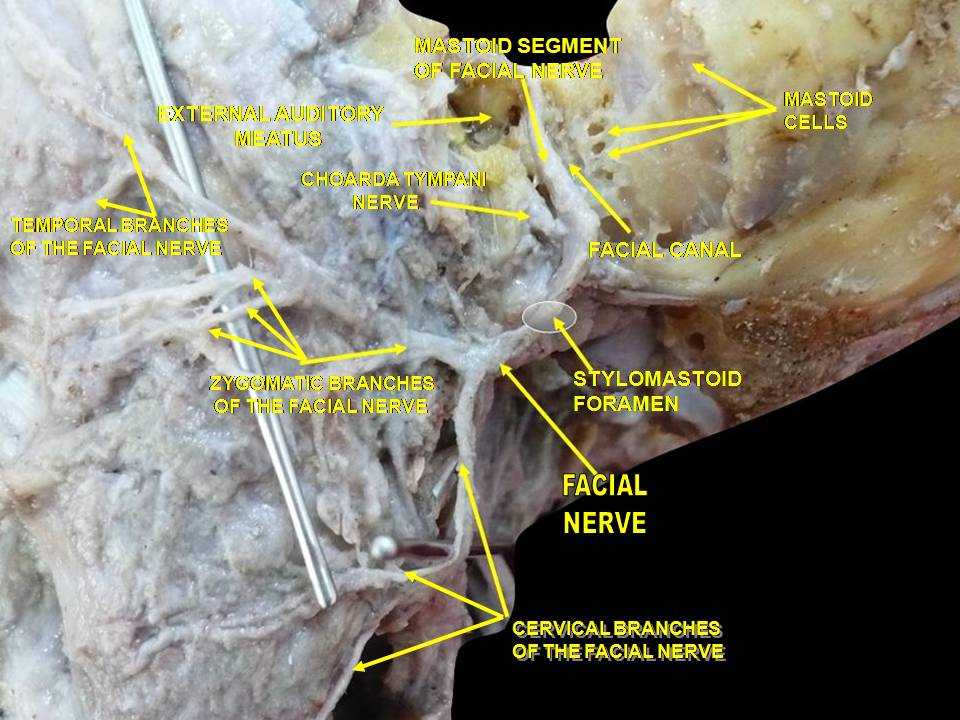
Lateral head anatomy detail. Facial nerve dissection.
