= Depressor labii inferioris muscle =

Facial muscle that helps to lower the bottom lip

Depressor labii
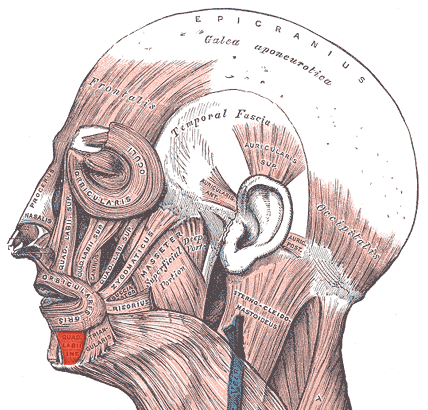
- Muscles of the head, face, and neck.

Details
- Origin: Oblique line of the mandible, between the symphysis and the mental foramen
- Insertion: Integument of the lower lip, orbicularis oris fibers, its fellow of the opposite side
- Nerve: Marginal mandibular branch of the facial nerve
- Actions: Depression of the lower lip
- Antagonist: Orbicularis oris muscle

Identifiers
- Latin: musculus depressor labii inferioris
- TA98: A04.1.03.033
- TA2: 2083
- FMA: 46816

The depressor labii inferioris (or quadratus labii inferioris) is a facial muscle. It helps to lower the bottom lip.

== Structure ==
The depressor labii inferioris muscle arises from the lateral surface of the mandible. This is below the mental foramen, and the origin may be around 3 cm wide. It inserts on the skin of the lower lip, blending in with the orbicularis oris muscle around 2 cm wide. At its origin, depressor labii is continuous with the fibers of the platysma muscle. Some yellow fat is intermingled with the fibers.

=== Nerve supply ===
The depressor labii inferioris muscle is supplied by the marginal mandibular branch of the facial nerve.

== Function ==
The depressor labii inferioris muscle helps to depress and everts the lower lip. It is the most important of the muscles of the lower lip for this function. It is an antagonist of the orbicularis oris muscle. It is needed to expose the mandibular (lower) teeth during smiling.

== Clinical significance ==
=== Resection ===
The depressor labii inferioris muscle may be resected (cut and removed) using surgery to correct an asymmetry of the lower lip when smiling. This asymmetry can be caused by paralysis of the marginal mandibular branch of the facial nerve on one side, so the healthy side may be cut to create symmetry. Local anaesthesia may be used, such as by blocking the mental nerve. This operation tends to be successful.

== History ==
The depressor labii inferioris muscle has also (mainly historically) been called the quadratus labii inferioris muscle. Note that in the 1918 edition of Gray's Anatomy illustration used here that its abbreviation is "Quad. labii inf." (sic).

== See also ==
- Facial muscles
- Depressor anguli oris muscle

== Additional images ==
Position of depressor labii inferioris muscle (red).

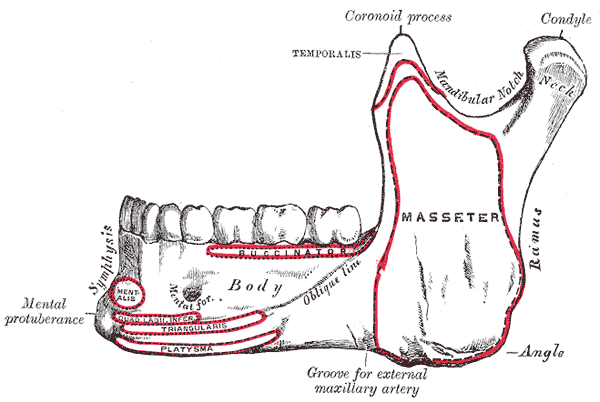
Mandible. Outer surface. Side view.
