= Facial nerve =

Cranial nerve VII, for the face and tasting

- The course of the facial nerve is shown here

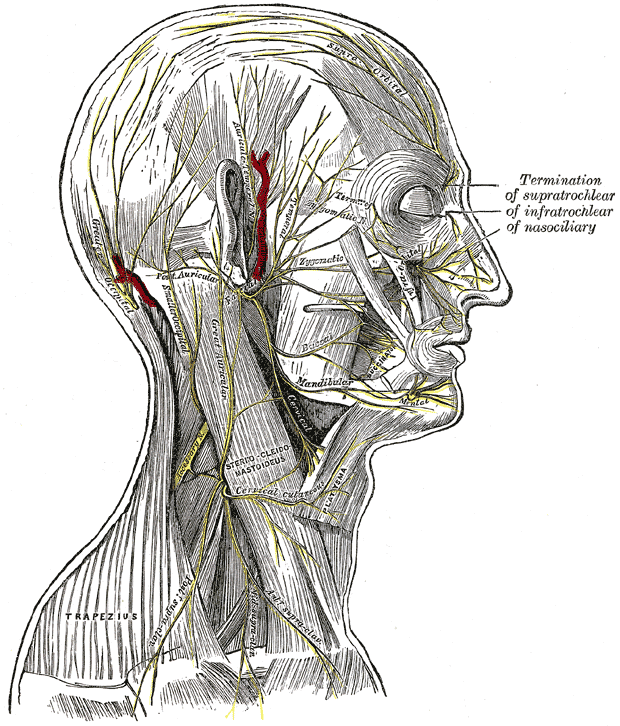
- The nerves of the scalp, face, and side of neck.

Details
- From: Facial nerve nucleus, intermediate nerve
- To: Greater superficial petrosal nerve
- Innervates: Motor: Muscles of facial expression, posterior belly of digastric, stylohyoid, stapedius Special sensory: taste to anterior two-thirds of tongue Parasympathetic: submandibular gland, sublingual gland, lacrimal glands

Identifiers
- Latin: nervus facialis
- MeSH: D005154
- NeuroNames: 551
- TA98: A14.2.01.099
- TA2: 6284
- FMA: 50868

The facial nerve, also known as the seventh cranial nerve, cranial nerve VII, or simply CN VII, is a cranial nerve that emerges from the pons of the brainstem, controls the muscles of facial expression, and functions in the conveyance of taste sensations from the anterior two-thirds of the tongue. The nerve typically travels from the pons through the facial canal in the temporal bone and exits the skull at the stylomastoid foramen. It arises from the brainstem from an area posterior to the cranial nerve VI (abducens nerve) and anterior to cranial nerve VIII (vestibulocochlear nerve).

The facial nerve also supplies preganglionic parasympathetic fibers to several head and neck ganglia.

The facial and intermediate nerves can be collectively referred to as the nervus intermediofacialis.

== Structure ==
The path of the facial nerve can be divided into six segments:

1. intracranial (cisternal) segment (from pons to internal auditory canal)
2. meatal (canalicular) segment (within the internal auditory canal)
3. labyrinthine segment (internal auditory canal to geniculate ganglion)
4. tympanic (or horizontal) segment (from geniculate ganglion to pyramidal eminence)
5. mastoid (or vertical) segment (from pyramidal eminence to stylomastoid foramen)
6. extratemporal segment (from stylomastoid foramen to post parotid branches)

The motor part of the facial nerve arises from the facial nerve nucleus in the pons, while the sensory and parasympathetic parts of the facial nerve arise from the intermediate nerve.

From the brainstem, the motor and sensory parts of the facial nerve join and traverse the posterior cranial fossa before entering the petrous temporal bone via the internal auditory meatus. Upon exiting the internal auditory meatus, the nerve then runs a tortuous course through the facial canal, which is divided into the labyrinthine, tympanic, and mastoid segments.

The labyrinthine segment is the shortest and narrowest segment of the facial nerve. As a result, it is the most commonly involved segment when there is intracranial injury. It ends where the facial nerve forms a bend known as the geniculum of the facial nerve (genu meaning knee), which contains the geniculate ganglion for sensory nerve bodies. The first branch of the facial nerve, the greater superficial petrosal nerve, arises here from the geniculate ganglion. The greater superficial petrosal nerve runs through the pterygoid canal and synapses at the pterygopalatine ganglion. Postsynaptic fibers of the greater superficial petrosal nerve innervate the lacrimal gland.

The tympanic segment of the facial nerve runs through the tympanic cavity, between the malleus and the incus. The tympanic segment is most commonly injured during middle ear surgery.

The pyramidal eminence is the second bend in the facial nerve, where the nerve runs downward as the mastoid segment, the longest segment of the facial nerve. The mastoid segment is the most common iatrogenically injured segment of the facial nerve. In the temporal part of the facial canal, the nerve gives branch to the stapedius muscle and chorda tympani. The chorda tympani supplies taste fibers to the anterior two thirds of the tongue, and also synapses with the submandibular ganglion. Postsynaptic fibers from the submandibular ganglion supply the sublingual and submandibular glands.

Upon emerging from the stylomastoid foramen, the facial nerve gives rise to the posterior auricular branch. It then gives rise to the branch to the posterior belly of the digastric, and then the branch to the stylohyoid. The facial nerve then passes through the parotid gland, which it does not innervate, to form the parotid plexus. The nerve then bifurcates at the pes anserinus to become the upper and lower divisions of the facial nerve. It then splits into five branches (temporal, zygomatic, buccal, marginal mandibular and cervical), innervating the muscles of facial expression.

=== Intracranial branches ===
The greater petrosal nerve arises at the superior salivatory nucleus of the pons and provides parasympathetic innervation to several glands, including the nasal glands, the palatine glands, and the lacrimal gland. It also provides parasympathetic innervation to the sphenoid sinus, frontal sinus, maxillary sinus, ethmoid sinus, and nasal cavity. This nerve also includes taste fibers for the palate via the lesser palatine nerve and greater palatine nerve.

The communicating branch to the otic ganglion arises at the geniculate ganglion and joins the lesser petrosal nerve to reach the otic ganglion.

The nerve to stapedius provides motor innervation for the stapedius muscle in middle ear.

The chorda tympani provides parasympathetic innervation to the sublingual and submandibular glands, as well as special sensory taste fibers for the anterior two thirds of the tongue.

=== Extracranial branches ===
Distal to the stylomastoid foramen, the following nerves branch off the facial nerve:

- Posterior auricular nerve which controls movements of some of the scalp muscles around the ear
- Branch to posterior belly of digastric muscle
- Branch of the stylohyoid muscle
- Five terminal (all motor) facial branches (at parotid plexus) – from superior to inferior:
  - Temporal branch
  - Zygomatic branch
  - Buccal branch
  - Mandibular branch
  - Cervical branch

There is a mnemonic to easily remember the said terminal branches: To (Temporal) Zanzibar (Zygomatic) By (Buccal) Motor (Mandibular) Car (Cervical).

=== Nucleus ===
The cell bodies for the facial nerve are grouped in anatomical areas called nuclei or ganglia. The cell bodies for the afferent nerves are found in the geniculate ganglion for taste sensation. The cell bodies for muscular efferent nerves are found in the facial motor nucleus whereas the cell bodies for the parasympathetic efferent nerves are found in the superior salivatory nucleus.

=== Development ===
The facial nerve is developmentally derived from the second pharyngeal arch. The second arch is called the hyoid arch because it contributes to the formation of the lesser horn and upper body of the hyoid bone (the rest of the hyoid is formed by the third arch). The facial nerve supplies motor and sensory innervation to the muscles formed by the second pharyngeal arch, including the muscles of facial expression, the posterior belly of the digastric, stylohyoid, and stapedius. The motor division of the facial nerve is derived from the basal plate of the embryonic pons, while the sensory division originates from the cranial neural crest.

Although the anterior two thirds of the tongue are derived from the first pharyngeal arch, which gives rise to the trigeminal nerve, not all innervation of the tongue is supplied by it. The lingual branch of the mandibular division (V3) of the trigeminal nerve supplies non-taste sensation (pressure, heat, texture) to the anterior part of the tongue via general somatic afferent fibers. Nerve fibers for taste are supplied by the chorda tympani branch of the facial nerve via special visceral afferent fibers.

== Function ==
=== Facial expression ===
The main function of the facial nerve is motor control of all the muscles of facial expression. These skeletal muscles are developed from the second pharyngeal arch.

=== Facial sensation and taste ===
In addition, the facial nerve receives taste sensations from the anterior two-thirds of the tongue via the chorda tympani. Taste sensation is sent to the gustatory portion (superior part) of the solitary nucleus. General sensation from the anterior two-thirds of tongue are supplied by afferent fibers of the third division of the mandibular nerve CN V3. These sensory CN V3 and taste (VII) fibers travel together as the lingual nerve briefly before the chorda tympani leaves the lingual nerve to enter the tympanic cavity (middle ear) via the petrotympanic fissure. It joins the rest of the facial nerve via the canaliculus for chorda tympani. The facial nerve then forms the geniculate ganglion, which contains the cell bodies of the taste fibers of chorda tympani and other taste and sensory pathways. From the geniculate ganglion, the taste fibers continue as the intermediate nerve which goes to the upper anterior quadrant of the fundus of the internal acoustic meatus along with the motor root of the facial nerve. The intermediate nerve reaches the posterior cranial fossa via the internal acoustic meatus before synapsing in the solitary nucleus.

The facial nerve also supplies a small amount of afferent innervation to the oropharynx below the palatine tonsil. There is also a small amount of cutaneous sensation carried by the intermediate nerve from the skin in and around the auricle (outer ear).

=== Other ===
The facial nerve also innervates the posterior belly of the digastric muscle, the stylohyoid muscle, and the stapedius muscle of the middle ear.

The facial nerve also supplies parasympathetic fibers to the submandibular gland and sublingual glands via chorda tympani. Parasympathetic innervation serves to increase the flow of saliva from these glands. It also supplies parasympathetic innervation to the nasal mucosa and the lacrimal gland via the pterygopalatine ganglion. The parasympathetic fibers that travel in the facial nerve originate in the superior salivatory nucleus.

The facial nerve also functions as the efferent limb of the acoustic reflex and corneal reflex.

=== Functional components ===
The facial nerve carries general somatic afferent fibers, to the skin of the posterior ear.

The facial nerve also carries general visceral efferent fibers, which innervate the sublingual, submandibular, and lacrimal glands, and also the mucosa of nasal cavity.

Special visceral efferent fibers innervate muscles of facial expression, stapedius, the posterior belly of digastric, and the stylohyoid.

Special visceral afferent fibers provide taste to the anterior two-thirds of tongue via chorda tympani.

== Clinical significance ==
=== Intraoperative Identification ===
It is important to identify the facial nerve in a variety of surgeries (eg, parotidectomy, middle ear surgery, mastoidectomy) to avoid injury. There are several ways to identify the facial nerve intraoperatively.

1. Most reliable: 6-8mm deep to the tympanomastoid suture line
2. 1cm anterior, inferior, and deep (or medial) to the tragal pointer.
3. At the stylomastoid foramen
4. At the posterior belly of digastric by tracing this backwards to the tympanic plate, the nerve can be found between these two structures
5. By locating the posterior facial vein at the inferior aspect of the parotid gland where the marginal branch would be seen crossing it.
6. Lateral semicircular canal
7. Foot of incus

=== Palsy ===
People may suffer from acute facial nerve paralysis, which is usually manifested by facial paralysis. Bell's palsy is one type of idiopathic acute facial nerve paralysis, which is more accurately described as a multiple cranial nerve ganglionitis that involves the facial nerve, and most likely results from viral infection and also sometimes as a result of Lyme disease. Iatrogenic Bell's palsy may also be as a result of an incorrectly placed dental local-anesthetic (inferior alveolar nerve block). Although giving the appearance of a hemiplegic stroke, effects dissipate with the drug. When the facial nerve is permanently damaged due to a birth defect, trauma, or other disorder, surgery including a cross facial nerve graft or masseteric facial nerve transfer may be performed to help regain facial movement. Facial nerve decompression surgery is also sometimes carried out in certain cases of facial nerve compression.

=== Examination ===
The facial nerve is typically assessed by asking the patient to move the muscles of facial expression associated with each post-parotid branch of the facial nerve (eg, temporal, zygomatic, buccal, marginal mandibular, cervical). Ideally, the specific muscles tested are primarily innervated by a single branch of the facial nerve to better isolate the function of each branch. The temporal branch is best tested by assessing the frontalis by asking the patient to raise the eyebrows. The zygomatic branch is best tested by assessing the orbicularis oculi by asking the patient to close their eyes and squeeze tightly. The buccal branch is best tested by assessing the orbicularis oris by asking the patient to pucker the lips (or say "ooh"). The marginal mandibular branch is best tested by assessing the depressor anguli oris by asking the patient to frown or show the bottom teeth (to evert the bottom lip). The cervical branch is usually not tested, but could be tested by assessing the platysma by asking the patient to tense the neck.

Of note, asking the patient to puff out the cheeks or smile are typically nonspecific or inadequate ways to isolate specific facial nerve branches due to cross innervation of the muscles involved.

Facial nerve function is typically graded using the House-Brackmann scoring system from 1 to 6 where 1 indicates normal movement, 6 indicates complete paralysis, 3 or less indicates full eye closure, and 4 or above indicates incomplete eye closure.

In an upper motor neuron lesion, called central seven, only the lower part of the face on the contralateral side will be affected, due to the bilateral control to the upper facial muscles (frontalis and orbicularis oculi).

Lower motor neuron lesions can result in a CN VII palsy (Bell's palsy is the idiopathic form of facial nerve palsy), manifested as both upper and lower facial weakness on the same side of the lesion.

Taste can be tested on the anterior two-thirds of the tongue. This can be tested with a swab dipped in a flavored solution, or with electronic stimulation (similar to putting your tongue on a battery).

==== Corneal reflex ====
The afferent arc is mediated by the general sensory afferents of the ophthalmic branch (V1) of the trigeminal nerve. The efferent arc occurs via the facial nerve. The reflex involves consensual blinking of both eyes in response to stimulation of one eye. This is due to the facial nerves' innervation of the muscles of facial expression, namely orbicularis oculi, responsible for blinking. Thus, the corneal reflex effectively tests the proper functioning of both cranial nerves V and VII.

== Additional images ==
Inferior view of the human brain, with the cranial nerves labelled.

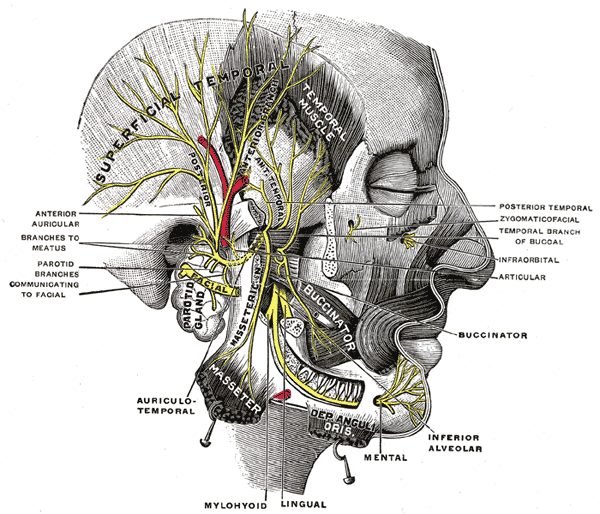
Mandibular division of the trifacial nerve.

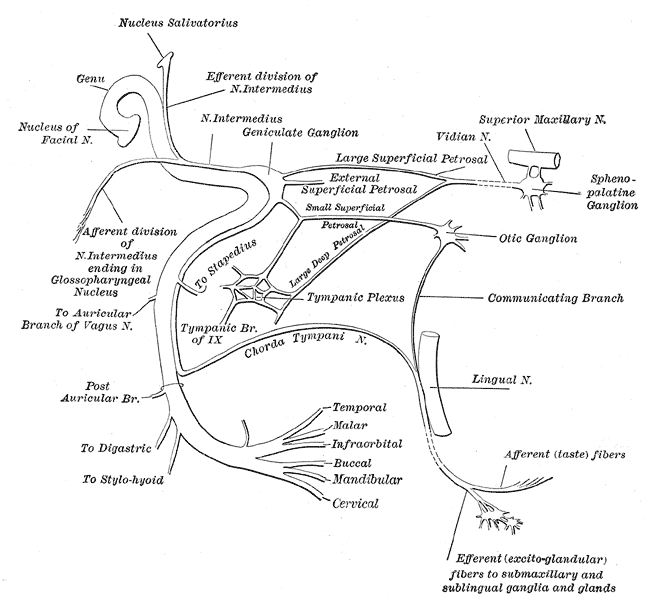
Plan of the facial and intermediate nerves and their communication with other nerves.

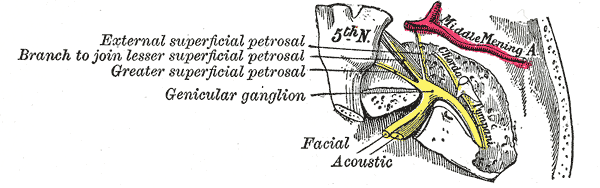
The course and connections of the facial nerve in the temporal bone.

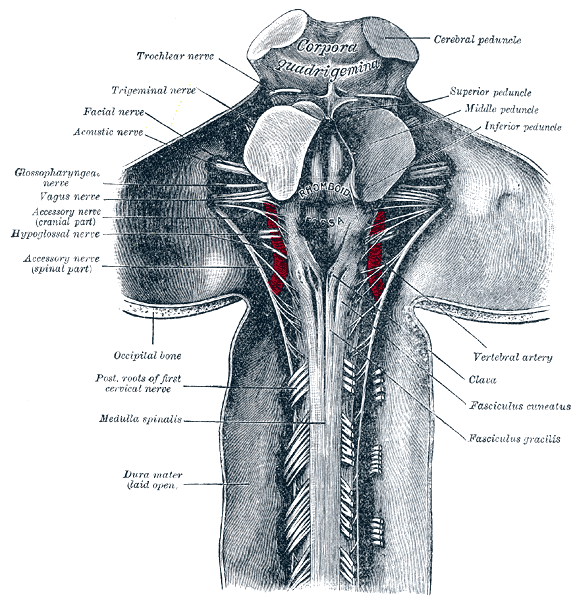
Upper part of medulla spinalis and hind- and mid-brains; posterior aspect, exposed in situ.

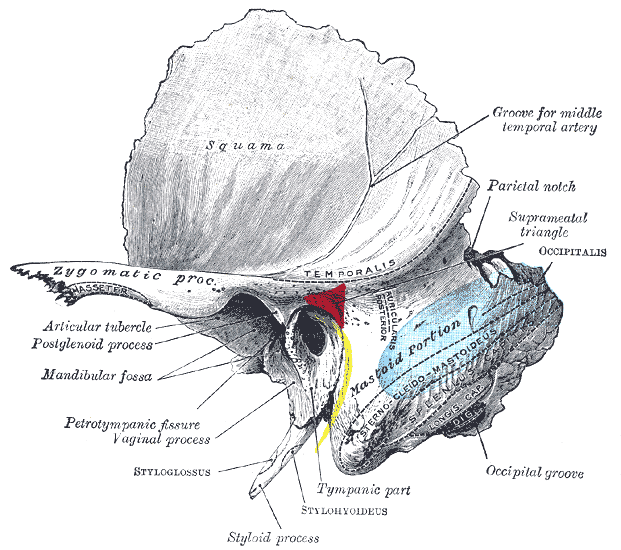
Left temporal bone showing surface markings for the tympanic antrum (red), transverse sinus (blue), and facial nerve (yellow).

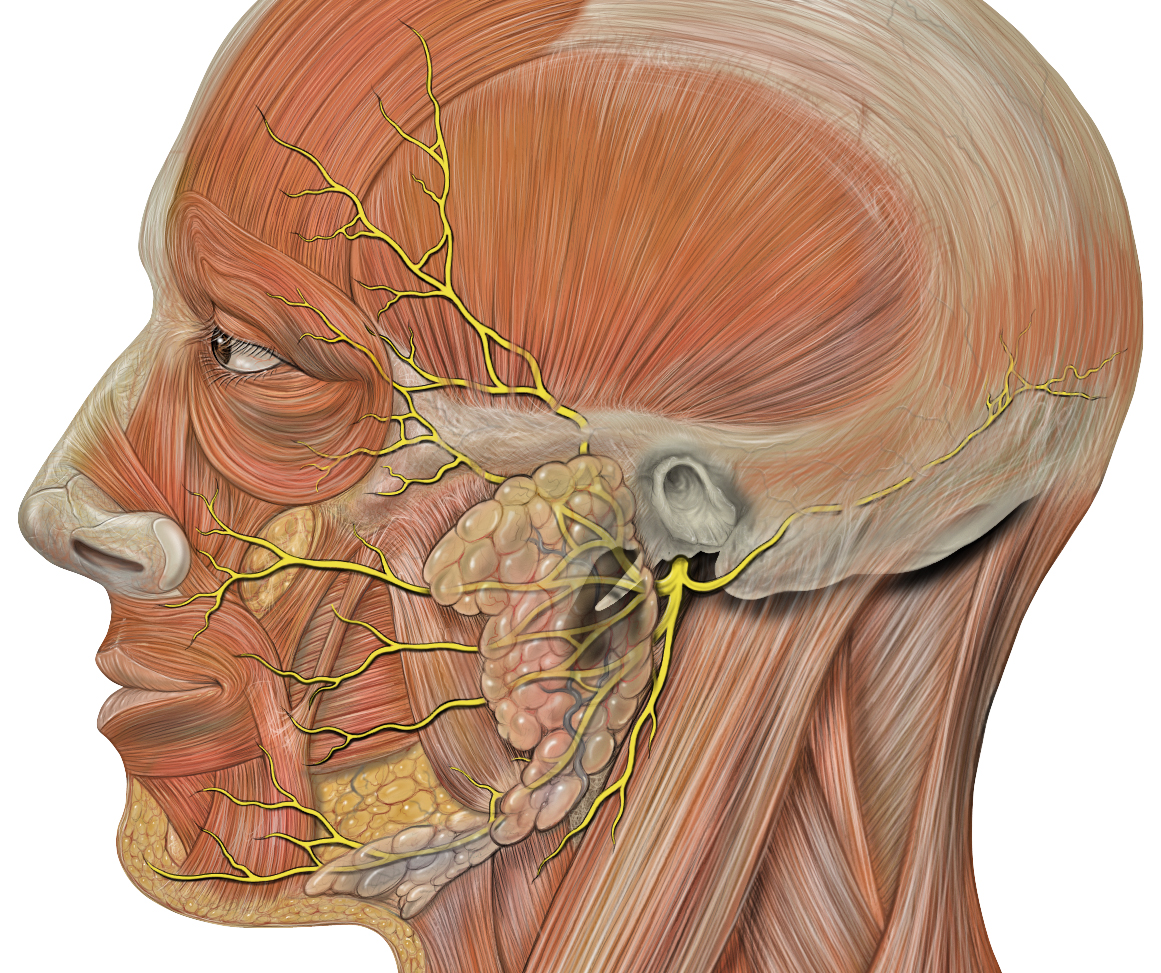
Head facial nerve branches

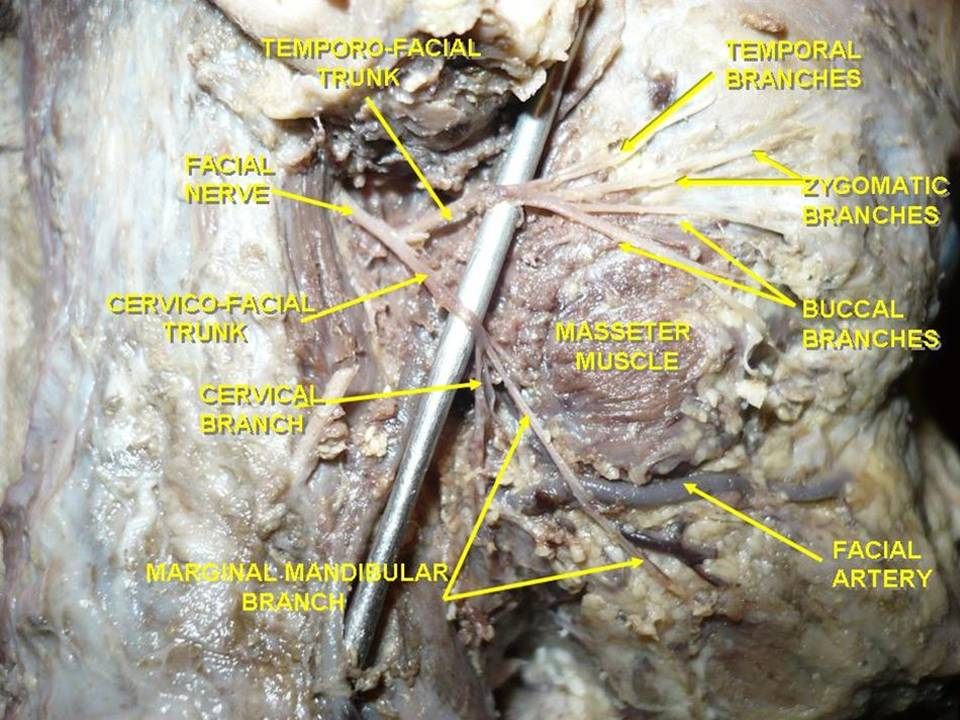
Facial nerve. Deep dissection.

== See also ==
- List of medical mnemonics#Anatomy
- List of anatomy mnemonics#Cranial nerves
