= Facial canal =

Hole in the temporal bone of the skull carrying the facial nerve

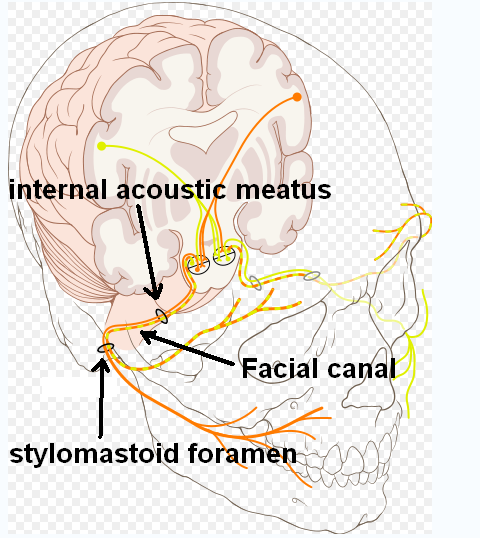
- Route of facial nerve, with facial canal labeled

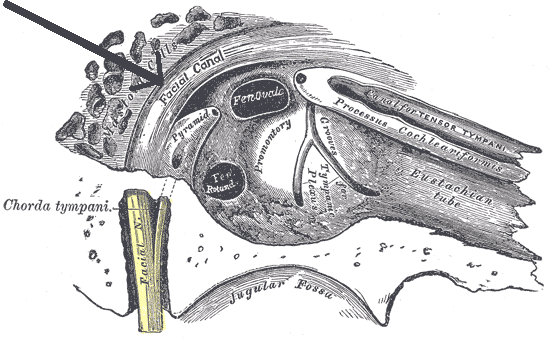
- View of the inner wall of the tympanum. (Facial canal visible in upper left; promontory labeled at center)

Details
- System: Skeletal
- Nerve: Facial nerve (CN VII)

Identifiers
- Latin: canalis nervi facialis, canalis facialis
- TA98: A02.1.06.009
- TA2: 688
- FMA: 54952

The facial canal (also known as the Fallopian canal) is a Z-shaped canal in the temporal bone of the skull. It extends between the internal acoustic meatus and stylomastoid foramen. It transmits the facial nerve (CN VII) (after which it is named).

== Anatomy ==
The facial canal gives passage to the facial nerve (CN VII) (hence the name). Its proximal opening is at the internal auditory meatus; its distal opening is the stylomastoid foramen. In humans, the canal is approximately 3 cm long, making it the longest bony canal of a nerve in the human body. It is located within the middle ear region.

The facial nerve gives rise to three nerves while passing through the canal: the greater petrosal nerve, nerve to stapedius, and the chorda tympani.

=== Structure ===
==== Horizontal part ====
The proximal portion of the facial canal is termed the horizontal part. It commences at the introitus of facial canal at the distal end of the internal auditory meatus. The horizontal part is further subdivided into two crura: the proximal/medial anterolaterally directed medial crus (or labyrinthine segment), and the distal/lateral posterolaterally directed lateral crus (or tympanic segment); the two crura meet at a sharp angle at the genu of facial canal (geniculum canalis facialis) where the geniculate ganglion is situated (at the genu, the greater petrosal nerve leaves the facial canal through the hiatus of the facial canal).

==== Descending part ====
The lateral crus of horizontal part ends by turning sharply inferior-ward, commencing the distal-most descending part (or mastoid segment) of facial canal which passes vertically inferior-ward, ending distally at the stylomastoid foramen. The descending part presents two openings through each of which a branch of the facial nerve passes: the nerve to stapedius enters the canaliculus for nerve to stapedius, and the chorda tympani enters the posterior canaliculus of chorda tympani (canaliculus chordae tympani, or iter chordae posterius).

=== Relations ===
The labyrinthine segment is situated superior to cochlea.

The canal traverses the medial wall of the tympanic cavity superior to the oval window; here, the prominence of the facial canal (or prominence of the aqueduct of Fallopius) upon the medial wall indicates the position of the superior portion of the facial canal. The canal then curves nearly vertically inferior-ward along the posterior wall. The tympanic segment is closely related to the posterior and medial walls of the tympanic cavity; it passes superior to the oval window and inferior to the lateral semicircular canal.

== Clinical significance ==
The facial canal may be interrupted in some people. This may lead to the facial nerve being split into 2 or 3 fibres, or it may be poorly formed or congenitally absent on one side.

== History ==
The facial canal was first described by Gabriele Falloppio. This is why it may also be known as the Fallopian canal.

== Gallery ==
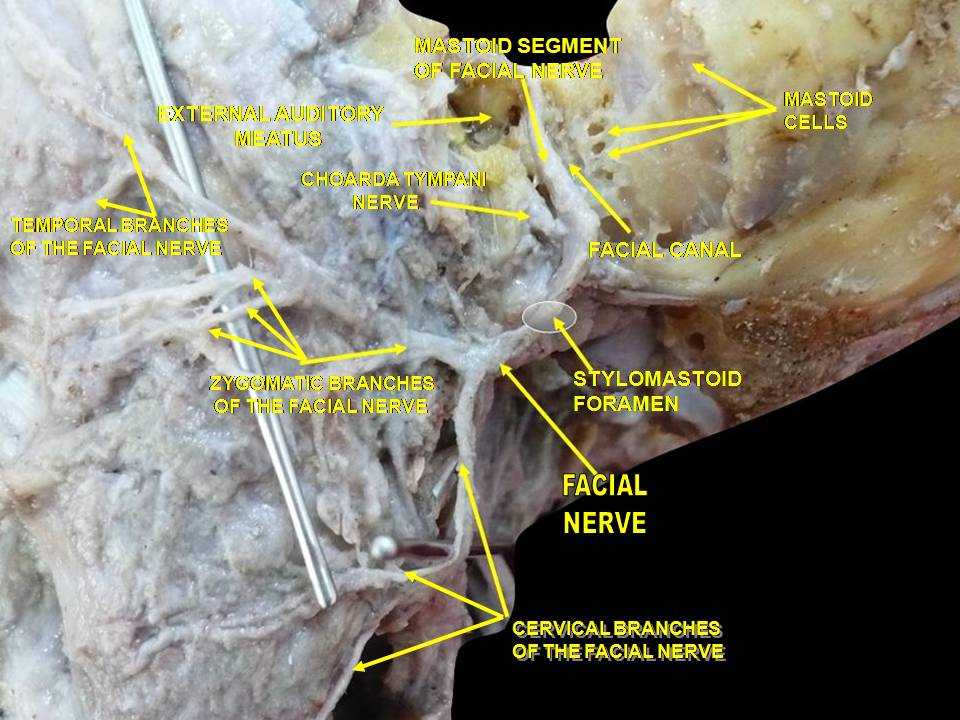
Lateral head anatomy detail. Facial nerve dissection.

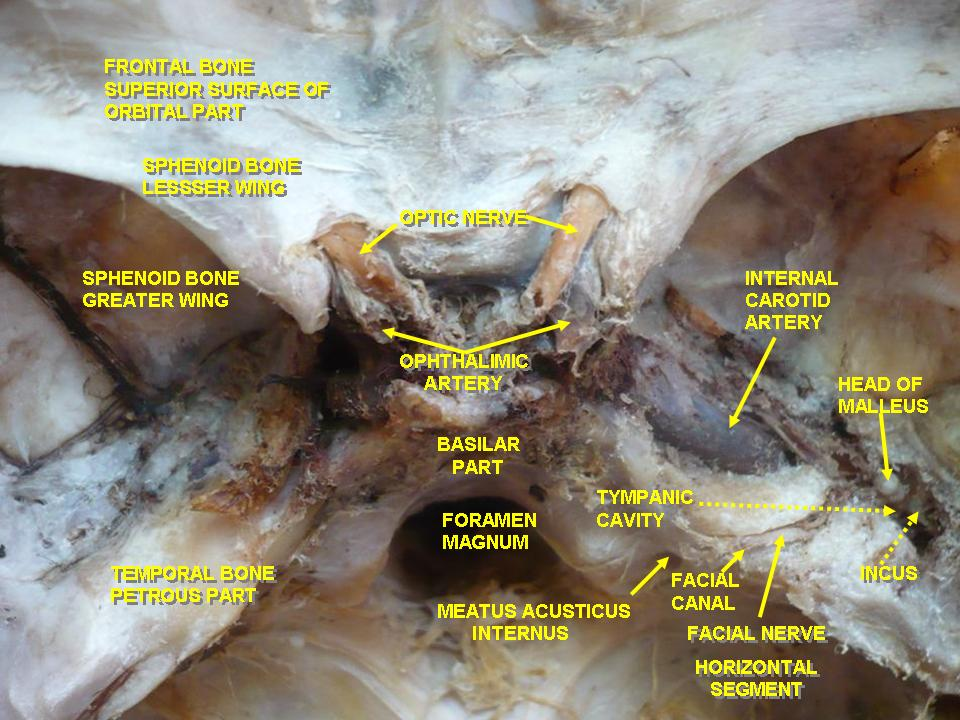
Tympanic cavity. Facial canal. Internal carotid artery.

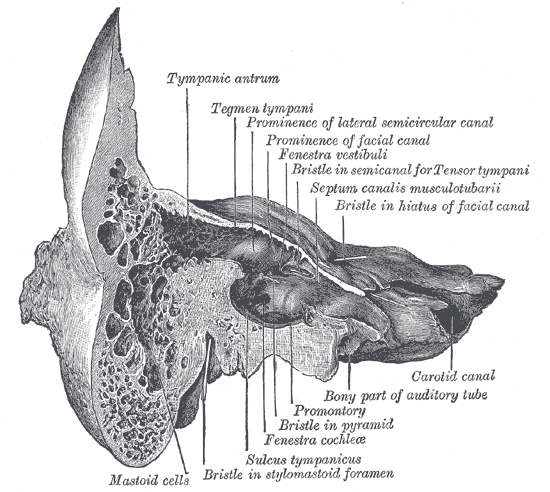
Coronal section of right temporal bone. Prominence of the facial canal labeled at top, fourth from the left.

== See also ==
- Facial nerve
- Prominence of the facial canal
- Hiatus of the facial canal
