= Stylomastoid foramen =

Foramen in the temporal bone of the skull

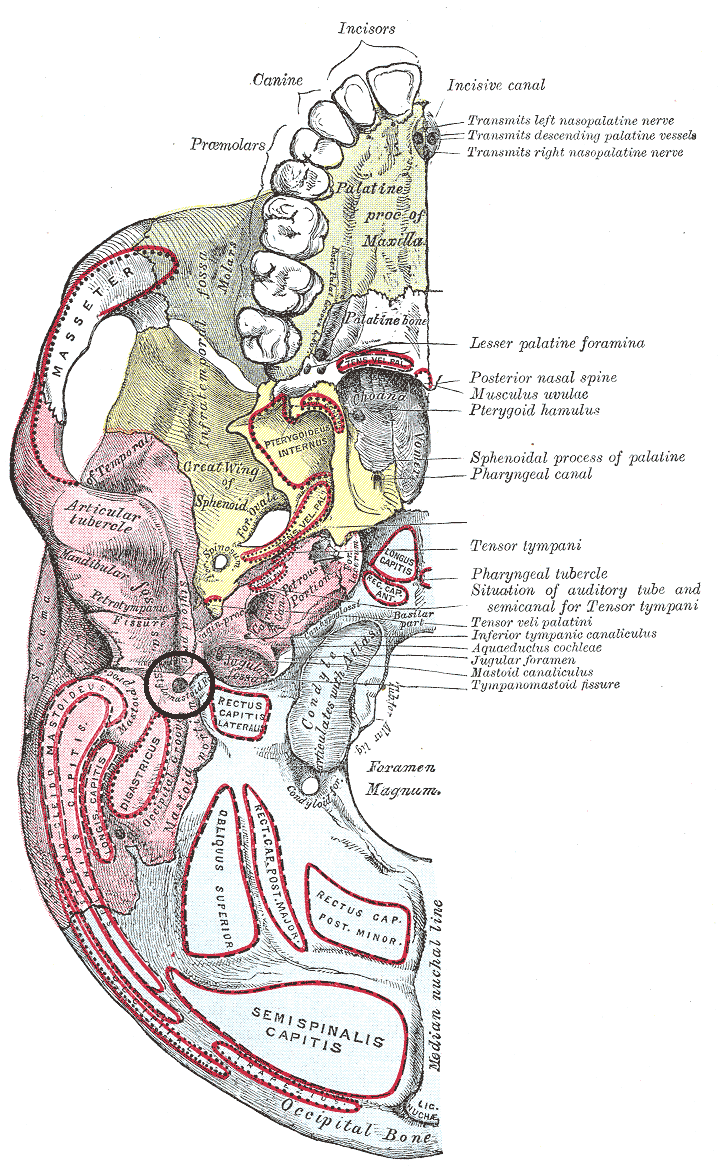
- Base of skull. Inferior surface. Pink region is temporal bone, and stylomastoid foramen is in black circle at center of pink region.

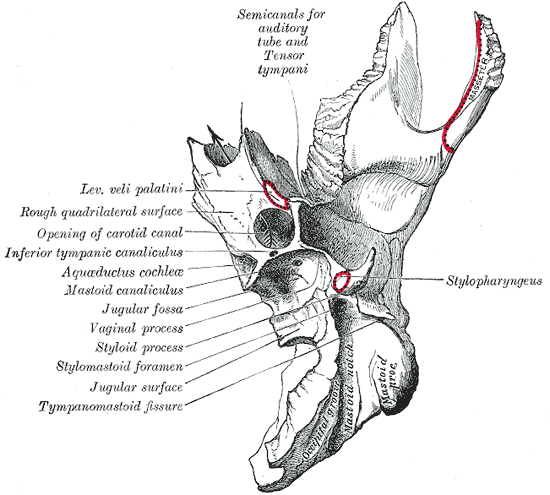
- Left temporal bone. Inferior surface. (Stylomastoid foramen is third label from the bottom on the left.)

Details
- Part of: Temporal bone of skull
- System: Skeletal

Identifiers
- Latin: foramen stylomastoideum
- TA98: A02.1.06.048
- TA2: 684
- FMA: 55816

The stylomastoid foramen is a foramen between the styloid and mastoid processes of the temporal bone of the skull. It is the termination of the facial canal, and transmits the facial nerve, and stylomastoid artery. Facial nerve inflammation in the stylomastoid foramen may cause Bell's palsy.

== Structure ==
The stylomastoid foramen is between the styloid and mastoid processes of the temporal bone. The average distance between the opening of the stylomastoid foramen and the styloid process is around 0.7 mm or 0.8 mm in adults, but may decrease to around 0.2 mm during aging.

The stylomastoid foramen transmits the facial nerve, and the stylomastoid artery. These two structures lie directly next to each other.

== Clinical significance ==
Bell's palsy can result from inflammation of the facial nerve where it leaves the skull at the stylomastoid foramen. Patients with Bell's palsy appear with facial drooping on the affected side.

== Additional images ==
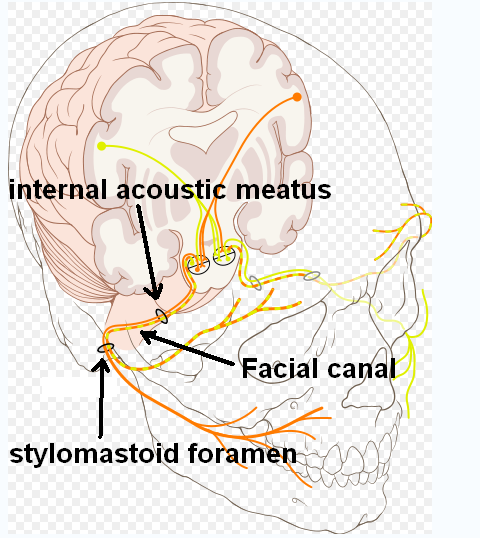
Facial canal

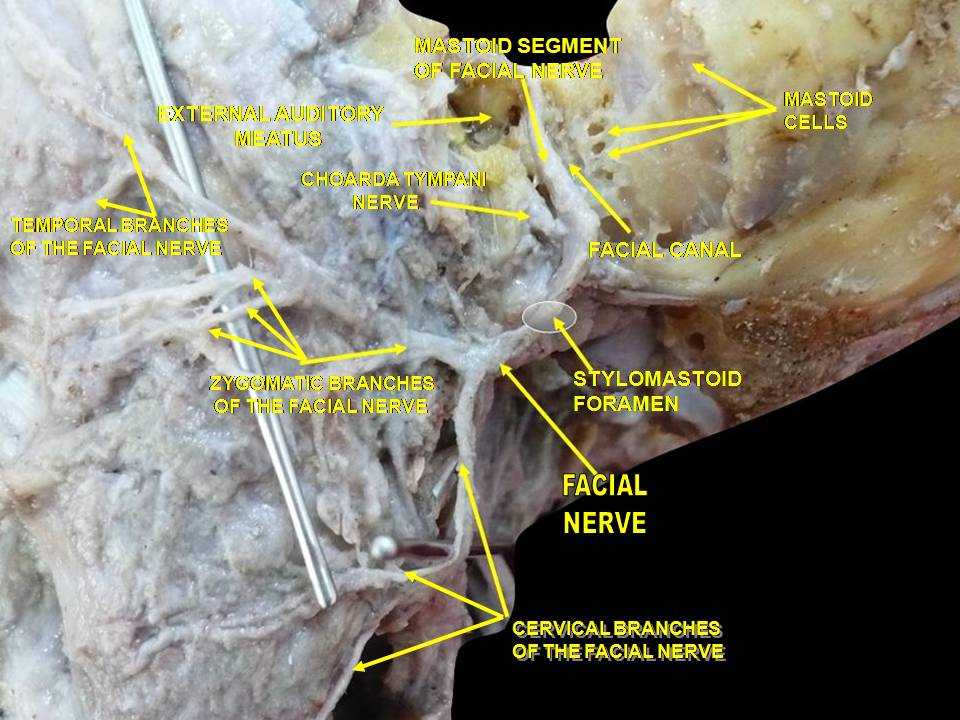
Lateral head anatomy detail. Facial nerve dissection.
