= Triangles of the neck =

Divisions created by the major muscles in the neck

- The triangles of the neck.

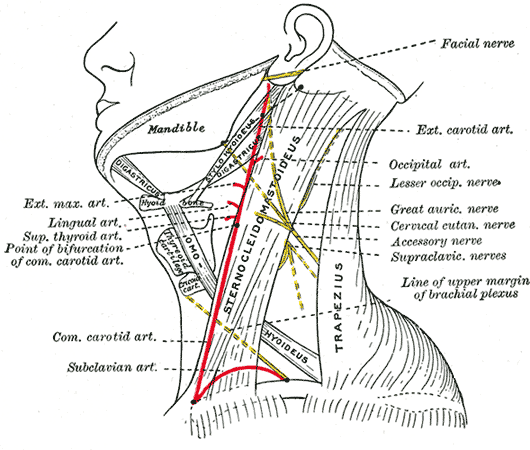
- Side of neck, showing chief surface markings. (Nerves are yellow, arteries are red.)

Details

Identifiers
- Latin: trigonum cervicale, trigonum colli, regio cervicalis

The triangles of the neck describe the divisions created by the major muscles in the region.

The side of the neck presents a somewhat quadrilateral outline, limited, above, by the lower border of the body of the mandible, and an imaginary line extending from the angle of the mandible to the mastoid process; below, by the upper border of the clavicle; in front, by the middle line of the neck; behind, by the anterior margin of the trapezius.

This space is subdivided into two large triangles by sternocleidomastoid, which passes obliquely across the neck, from the sternum and clavicle below, to the mastoid process and occipital bone above.

The triangular space in front of this muscle is called the anterior triangle of the neck; and that behind it, the posterior triangle of the neck.

The anterior triangle is further divided into muscular, carotid, submandibular and submental and the posterior into occipital and subclavian triangles. Farabeuf's triangle is a small triangle within the carotid triangle.

== Clinical relevance ==
The use of the divisions described as the triangles of the neck permit the effective communication of the location of palpable masses located in the neck between healthcare professionals.

The common swellings anterior of the midline are:

- Enlarged submental lymph nodes and sublingual dermoid in the submental region.
- Thyroglossal cyst and inflamed subhyoid bursa just below the hyoid bone.
- Goitre, carcinoma of larynx and enlarged lymph nodes in the suprasternal region.

== Additional images ==
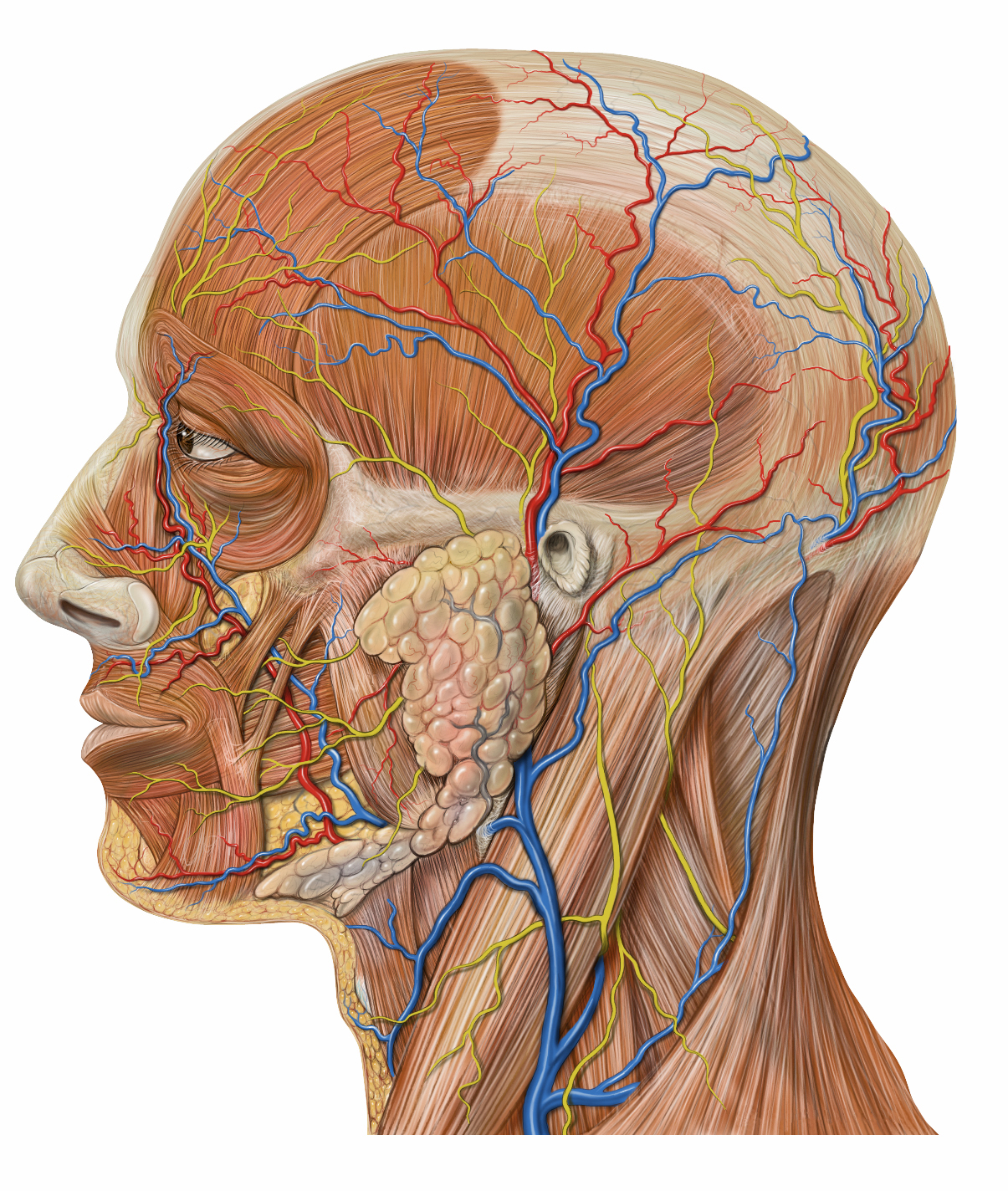
Lateral head anatomy detail
