= Submandibular triangle =

Region of the neck

- Submandibular triangle

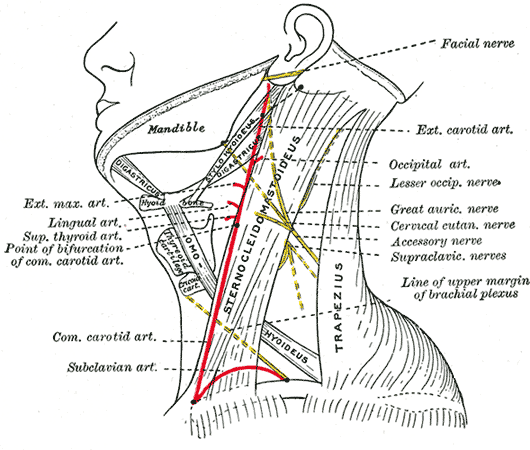
- Side of neck, showing chief surface markings. (Nerves are yellow, arteries are red.)

Details

Identifiers
- Latin: trigonum submandibulare
- TA98: A01.2.02.003
- TA2: 232
- FMA: 57779

The submandibular triangle (or submaxillary or digastric triangle) corresponds to the region of the neck immediately beneath the body of the mandible.

== Boundaries and coverings ==
It is bounded:

- above, by the lower border of the body of the mandible, and a line drawn from its angle to the mastoid process;
- below, by the posterior belly of the Digastricus; in front, by the anterior belly of the Digastricus.

It is covered by the integument, superficial fascia, Platysma, and deep fascia, ramifying in which are branches of the facial nerve and ascending filaments of the cutaneous cervical nerve.

Its floor is formed by the Mylohyoideus anteriorly, and by the hyoglossus posteriorly.

== Triangles ==
- Beclard Triangle
- Lesser Triangle
- Pirogoff Triangle

== Divisions ==
It is divided into an anterior and a posterior part by the stylomandibular ligament.

=== Anterior part ===
The anterior part contains the submandibular gland, superficial to which is the anterior facial vein, while imbedded in the gland is the facial artery and its glandular branches.

Beneath the gland, on the surface of the Mylohyoideus, are the submental artery and the mylohyoid artery and nerve.

=== Posterior part ===
The posterior part of this triangle contains the external carotid artery, ascending deeply in the substance of the parotid gland

This vessel lies here in front of, and superficial to, the external carotid, being crossed by the facial nerve, and gives off in its course the posterior auricular, superficial temporal, and internal maxillary branches: more deeply are the internal carotid, the internal jugular vein, and the vagus nerve, separated from the external carotid by the Styloglossus and Stylopharyngeus, and the hypoglossal nerve

== See also ==
- Anterior triangle of the neck
- Submandibular space

== Additional images ==
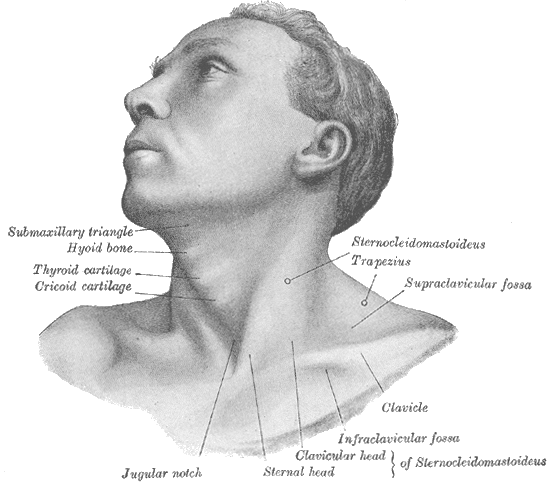
Anterolateral view of head and neck.

The triangles of the neck. (Anterior triangles to the left; posterior triangles to the right. Suprahyoid labeled at left.)

== Summary of contents ==
The following summarizes the important structures found in the submandibular triangle:

- Submandibular gland
- Facial artery (cervical section) with branches
1. Submental artery
2. Ascending palatine artery
3. Glandular branches to the submandibular branch
4. Tonsillar branch to palatine tonsil
- Facial vein
- Lingual artery
- Lingual vein
- Submandibular lymph nodes
- Submandibular ganglion
- Hypoglossal Nerve CN XII
- Lingual nerve
- Mylohyoid nerve
- Cervical branch of the facial nerve
