= Submental space =

Fascial space below the chin, also known as the jib.

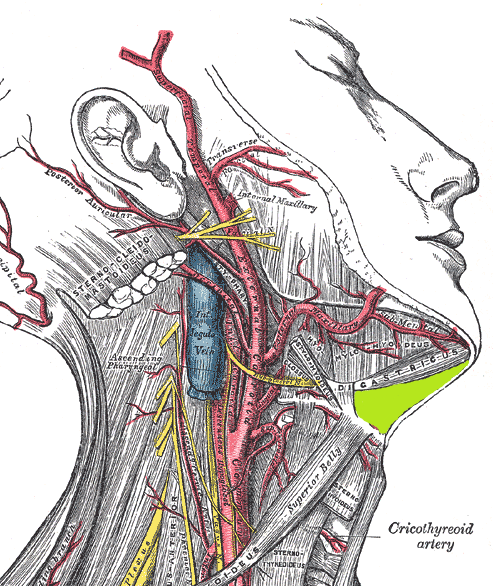
- Submental space situated on the superficial surface of mylohyoid muscle, medial to the anterior belly of the digastric muscle (highlighted in green).

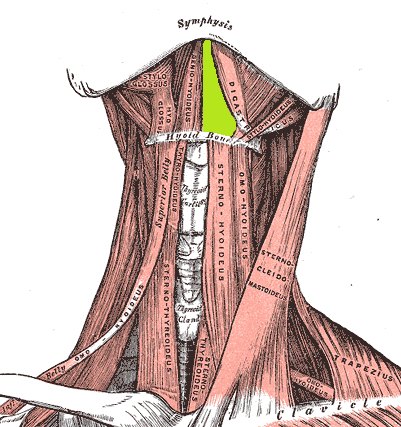
- Left half of the submental space (right side of diagram has digastric muscle removed).

Details

Identifiers
- Latin: spatium submentale

The submental space is a fascial space of the head and neck (sometimes also termed fascial spaces, tissue spaces or the jib). It is a potential space located between the mylohyoid muscle superiorly, the platysma muscle inferiorly, under the chin in the midline. The space coincides with the anatomic region termed the submental triangle, part of the anterior triangle of the neck.

== Location and structure ==
=== Anatomic boundaries ===
The boundaries of the submental space are:

- the mylohyoid muscle superiorly
- the investing layer of deep cervical fascia (and this in turn is covered by the platysma muscle) inferiorly
- the inferior border of the mandible anteriorly
- the hyoid bone posteriorly
- the anterior bellies of the digastric muscles laterally.

=== Communications ===
The communications of the submental space are:

- the submandibular spaces posterolaterally.
- the sublingual space superiorly (via erosion through the mylohyoid).

=== Contents ===
Its contents are submental lymph nodes, areolar connective tissue and the anterior jugular veins.

== Clinical relevance ==
This space may be created by pathology, such as the spread of pus in an infection. Odontogenic infection of the mandibular anterior teeth may erode through the lingual cortical plate of the mandible. If the level at which the infection breaks out of the mandible is below the attachment of the mylohyoid, then it will spread into the submental space. However, it is more usual for odontogenic infections to spread into the submental space via first involving the submandibular space. Cutaneous infections or symphyseal/parasymphyseal mandibular fractures may also give rise to a submental space infection. Signs and symptoms of a severe submental abscess include a firm swelling below the chin and dysphagia (difficulty swallowing). Treatment is by surgical incision and drainage, with the incision running transversely in a skin crease behind the chin.

Ludwig's angina is a progressive cellulitis involving the submandibular, sublingual and submental spaces bilaterally. Ludwig's angina may extend into the pharyngeal and cervical spaces, and the swelling can compress the airway and cause dyspnoea (difficulty breathing).
