= Deep lingual vein =

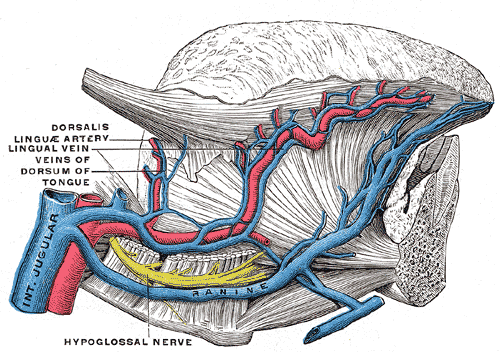
- Veins of the tongue. The hypoglossal nerve has been displaced downward in this preparation.

Details
- Drains to: Lingual vein
- Artery: Deep lingual artery

Identifiers
- Latin: vena profunda linguae
- TA98: A12.3.05.013
- TA2: 4811
- FMA: 50830

The deep lingual vein is one of the lingual veins. It commences near the apex of the tongue. It passes posterior-ward close to the inferior surface of the tongue. It terminates near the anterior border of the hyoglossus muscle by uniting with the sublingual vein to form the vena comitans of the hypoglossal nerve (ranine vein); this vein then passes posterior-ward alongside the nerve to empty into either a lingual vein, the (common) facial vein, or the internal jugular vein.
