= Lingual =

Lingual may refer to:

- Tongue, a muscular hydrostat on the floors of the mouths of most vertebrates which manipulates food for mastication
- Lingual, in dental anatomy, the side of the teeth that faces the tongue
- Lingual artery arises from the external carotid between the superior thyroid and facial artery
- Lingual veins begin on the dorsum, sides, and under surface of the tongue, and, passing backward along the course of the lingual artery, end in the internal jugular vein
- Lingual gyrus of the occipital lobe lies between the calcarine sulcus and the posterior part of the collateral sulcus
- Lingual bone
- Lingual nerve, a branch of the mandibular nerve
- HTLINGUAL
