= Louis Hubert Farabeuf =

French surgeon (1841–1910)

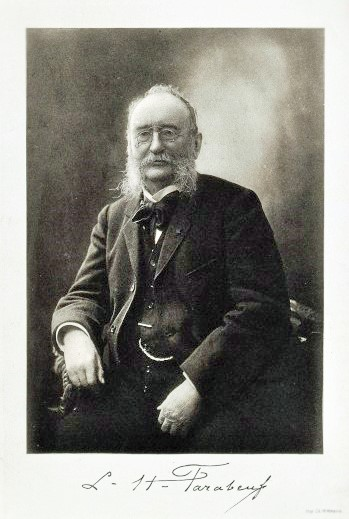
Louis Hubert Farabeuf

Louis Hubert Farabeuf (1841–1910), French surgeon who is said to have introduced hygiene in French medical schools. His statue dominates the central court of the National School of Medicine in Paris whose main amphitheater is also named after him. Farabeuf wrote some short surgical booklets (précis) and designed several medical instruments (such as the Farabeuf periosteal elevator) that are still in use today.

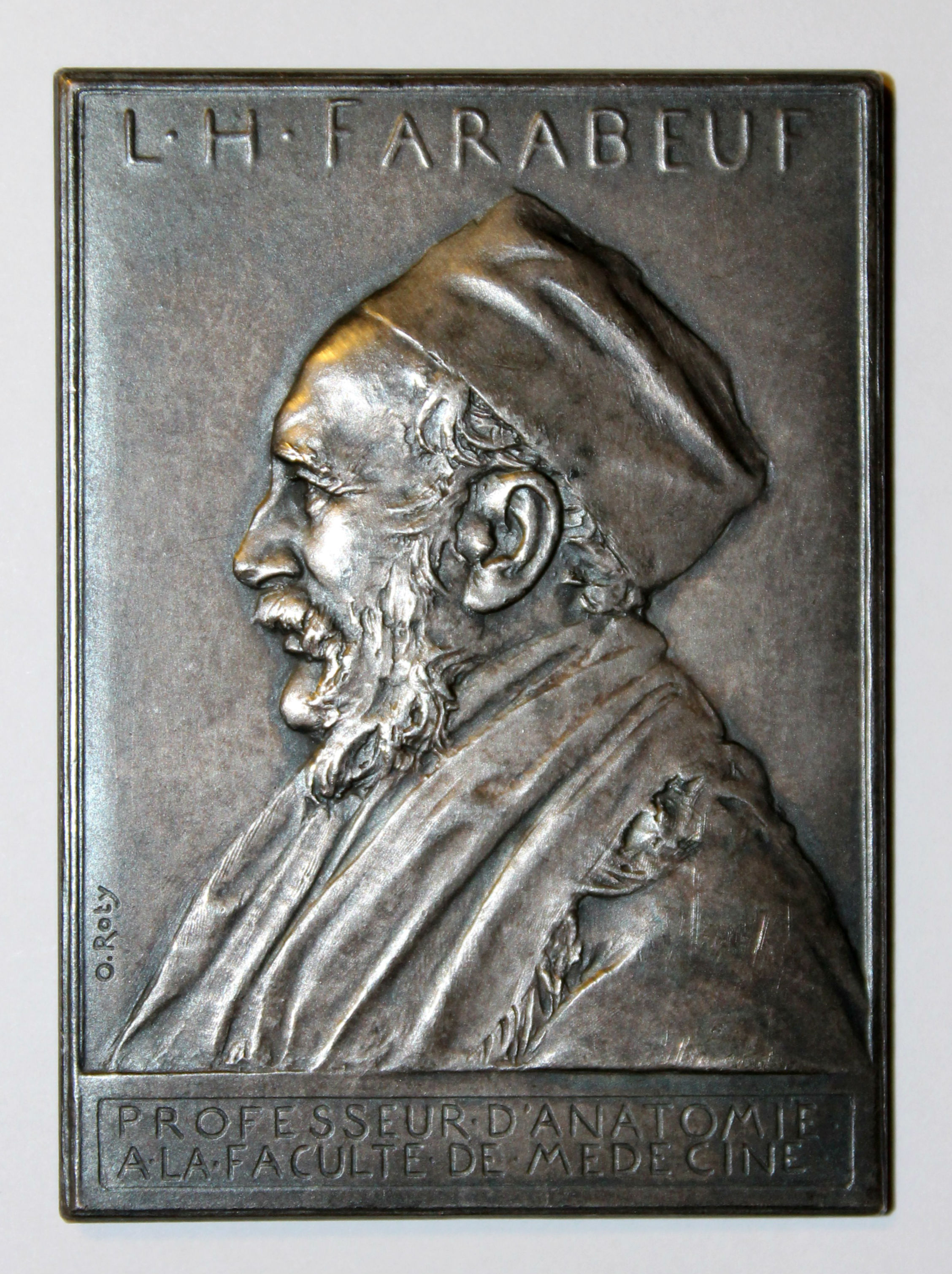
Louis Hubert Farabeuf medal by Louis-Oscar Roty

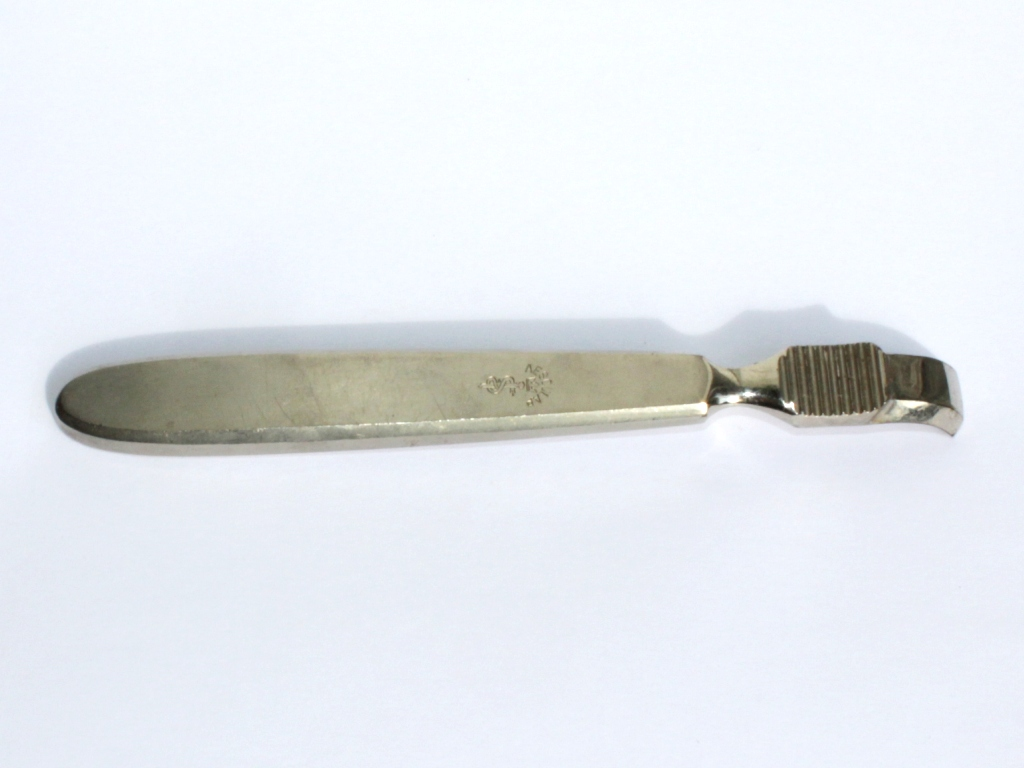
Farabeuf elevator

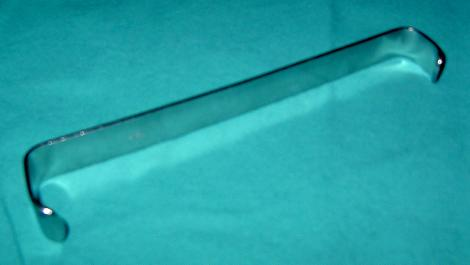
Farabeuf retractor

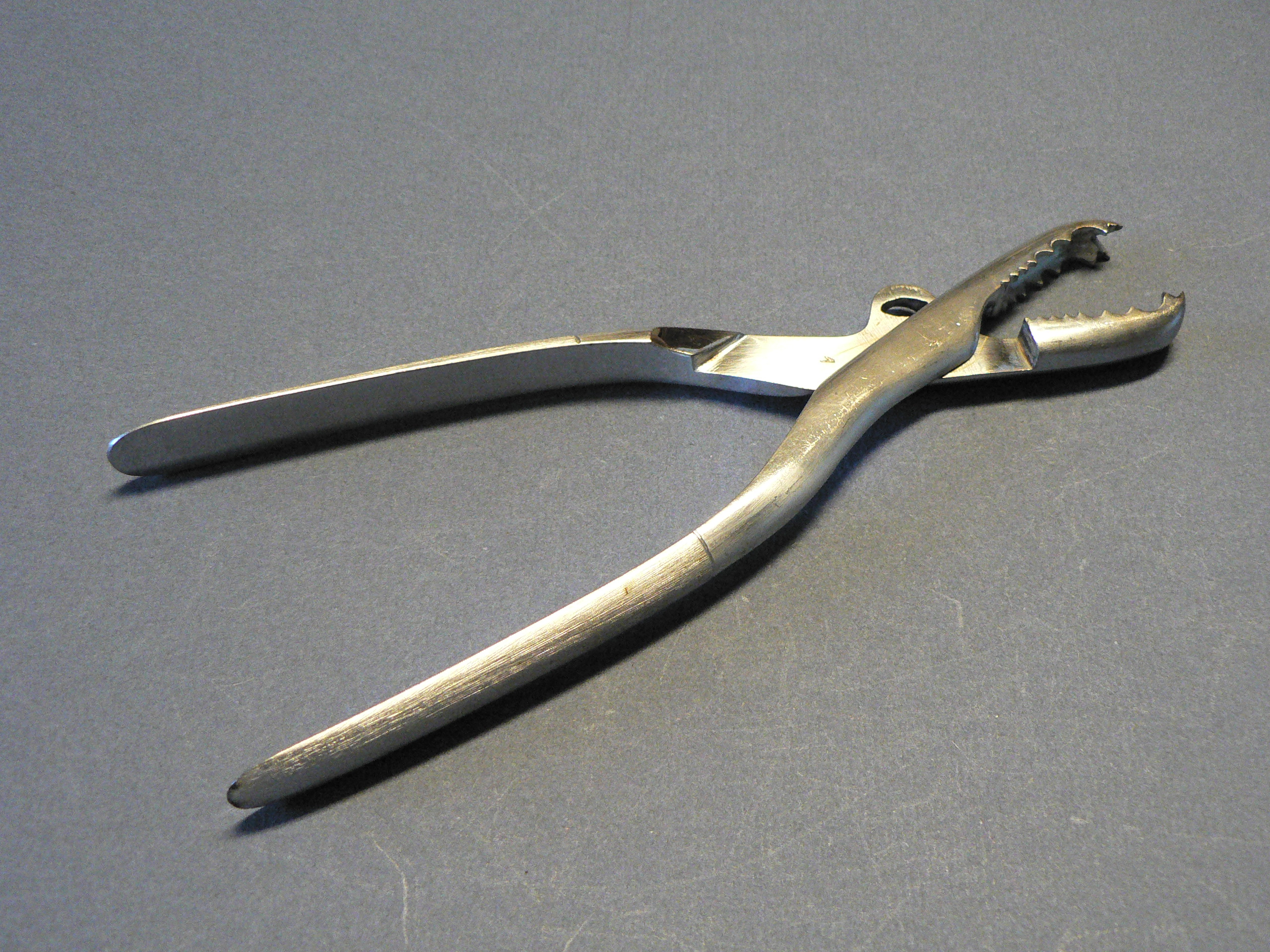
Farabeuf forceps

His name is associated with Farabeuf's triangle of the neck, a triangle formed by the internal jugular vein, common facial vein and the hypoglossal nerve, as well as Farabeuf retractors and Farabeuf bone holding forceps.

== Farabeuf as a Fictional Character ==
His passionate writings and descriptions of amputation surgery attracted the attention of writers and scholars.

- Mexican writer, Salvador Elizondo, wrote a cryptic book: Farabeuf o la Crónica de un instante. It is not a biography.

== Notes ==
- Farabeuf, Louis Hubert, Precis de manuel operatoire, Masson, Paris (1889)
- José, Alán, Farabeuf y la estética del mal, ESN (2003)
- Retractor (medical)
- https://medical-dictionary.thefreedictionary.com/Farabeuf+forceps
