= Submandibular space =

Fascial space of the head and neck

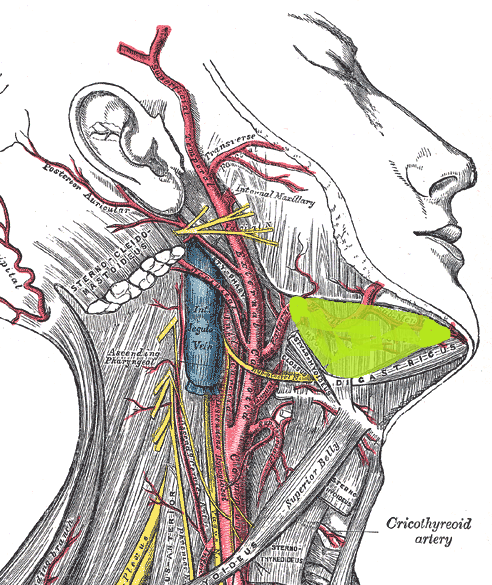
- Right submandibular space situated on the superficial surface of mylohyoid muscle, between the anterior and posterior bellies of the digastric muscle (highlighted in green).

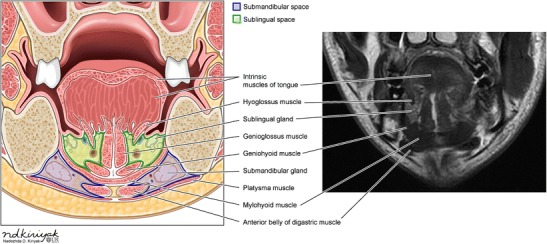
- Submandibular and sublingual space, coronal plane illustration and MRI

Details

Identifiers
- Latin: spatium submandibulare

The submandibular space is a fascial space of the head and neck (sometimes also termed fascial spaces or tissue spaces). It is a potential space, and is paired on either side, located on the superficial surface of the mylohyoid muscle between the anterior and posterior bellies of the digastric muscle. The space corresponds to the anatomic region termed the submandibular triangle, part of the anterior triangle of the neck.

== Location and structure ==
=== Anatomic boundaries ===
The anatomic boundaries of each submandibular space are:

- the mylohyoid muscle superiorly,
- the skin, superficial fascia, platysma muscle and superficial layer of the deep cervical fascia inferiorly and laterally,
- the medial surface of the mandible anteriorly and laterally,
- the hyoid bone posteriorly,
- the anterior belly of the digastric muscle medially.

=== Communications ===
The communications of the submandibular space are:

- medially and anteriorly to the submental space (located medial to the paired submandibular spaces, separated from them by the anterior bellies of the digastric muscles).
- posteriorly and superiorly to the sublingual space (located above the mylohyoid muscle)
- inferiorly to the lateral pharyngeal space

=== Contains ===
In health, the contents of the space are:

- the submandibular gland, which largely fills the space,
- branches of the facial and lingual artery
- lymph nodes.
- cranial nerve XII
- nerve to mylohyoid muscle

== Clinical relevance ==
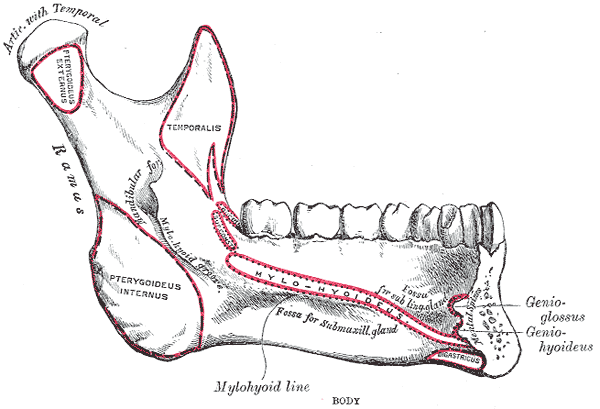
Diagram of medial surface of the mandible, showing the slanting attachment of mylohyoid (the mylohyoid line). This arrangement means that the apices of posterior teeth are more likely to be below the level of mylohyoid.

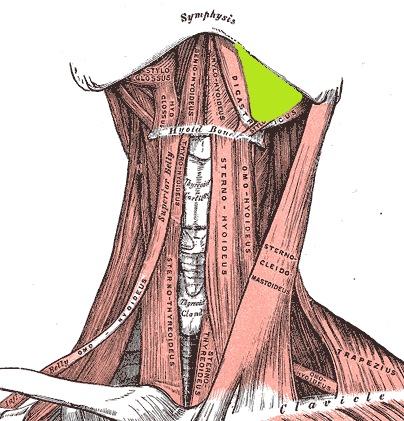
Left submandibular space (right side shown with digastric muscle removed).

Infections may spread into the submandibular space, e.g. odontogenic infections, often related to the mandibular molar teeth. This is due to the fact that the attachment of mylohyoid (the mylohyoid line) becomes more superior towards the posterior of the mandible, meaning that the roots of the posterior teeth are more likely to be below mylohyoid than above.

Signs and symptoms of a submandibular space infection might include trismus (difficulty opening the mouth), inability to palpate (feel) the inferior border of the mandible and swelling of the face over the submandibular region.

If the space contains pus, the usual treatment is by incision and drainage. The site of the incision is extra-oral, and usually made 2–3 cm below, and parallel to, the inferior border of the mandible.

Ludwig's angina is a serious infection involving the submandibular, sublingual and submental spaces bilaterally. Ludwig's angina may extend into the pharyngeal and cervical spaces, and the swelling can compress the airway and cause dyspnoea (difficulty breathing).
