= Sublingual space =

Fascial space of the head and neck

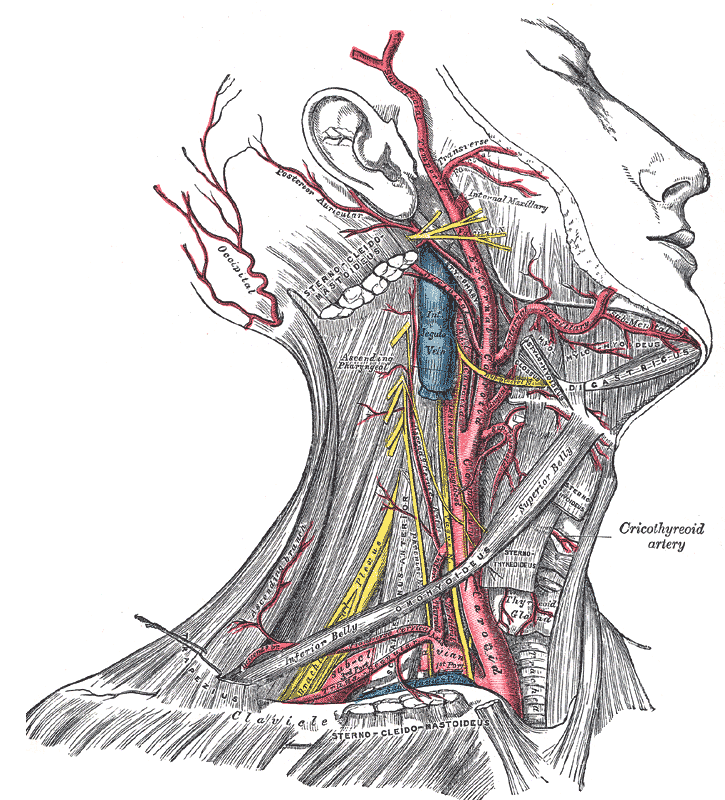
- Sublingual space situated deep to mylohyoid muscle

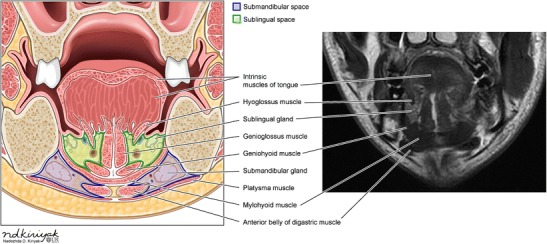
- Sublingual and submandibular space, coronal plane illustration and MRI

The sublingual space is a fascial space of the head and neck (sometimes also termed fascial spaces or tissue spaces). It is a potential space located below the mouth and above the mylohyoid muscle, and is part of the suprahyoid group of fascial spaces.

== Location and structure ==
=== Anatomic boundaries ===
The sublingual space is V-shaped, with the apex pointing to the anterior. Its boundaries are:

- the mucosa of the floor of mouth and the tongue superiorly
- the mylohyoid muscle inferiorly
- the medial surface of the mandible anterolaterally
- the muscles along the base of the tongue (geniohyoid and genioglossus muscles) posteriorly
- medially, the intrinsic muscles of the tongue and genioglossus separate the two halves of the sublingual space.

=== Communications ===
The sublingual space communicates posteriorly around the posterior free border of the mylohyoid muscle with the submandibular space. Infections of the sublingual space may also erode through the mylohyoid, or spread via the lymphatics to the submandibular and submental spaces.

=== Contents ===
The sublingual space contains:

- a number of blood vessels and nerves, e.g. the lingual artery and nerve, the hypoglossal nerve and the glossopharyngeal nerve.
- the sublingual salivary gland. Saliva from the sublingual gland drains through several small excretory ducts in the floor of the mouth. Sometimes a more distinctive duct can be recognized, known as Bartholin's duct.
- the deep part of the submandibular gland and the submandibular duct (Wharton's duct)
- some extrinsic tongue muscle fibers.

== Clinical relevance ==
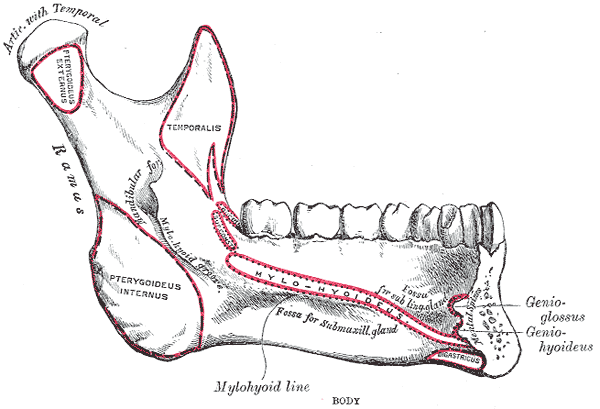
Diagram of medial surface of the mandible, showing the slanting attachment of mylohyoid (the mylohyoid line). This arrangement means that the apices of posterior teeth are more likely to be below the level of mylohyoid, so a periapical abscess associated with posterior teeth is more likely to spread into the submandibular space.

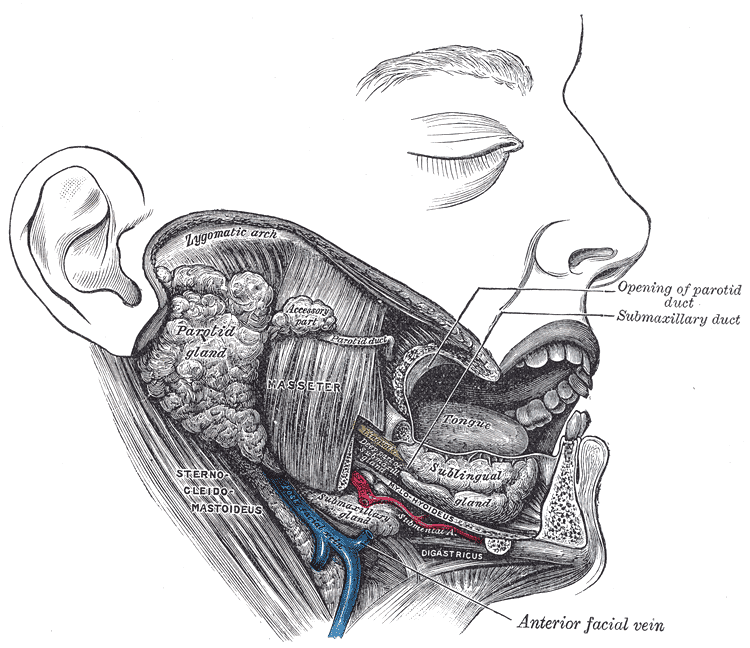
Diagram showing sublingual gland in sublingual space

This space may be created by pathology, such as the spread of pus in an infection, e.g. odontogenic infections. A periapical abscess may spread into the sublingual space if the apex of the tooth is above the level of attachment of mylohyoid, and the infection erodes through the lingual cortical plate of the mandible.

Signs and symptoms of a sublingual space infection might include a firm, painful swelling in the anterior part of the floor of the mouth. A sublingual abscess may elevate the tongue and cause drooling or dysphagia (difficulty swallowing). There is usually little swelling visible on the face outside the mouth.

If the space contains pus, the usual treatment is by incision and drainage. The site of the incision is intra-oral, made lateral to sublingual plica. Incision of the plica itself can result in a ranula, or an incision placed medial to the plica can damage Wharton's duct, the sublingual artery and veins and the lingual nerve.

Pathology arising from the sublingual gland is rare, however, sublingual gland neoplasms are predominantly malignant and thus important to recognize.

Ludwig's angina is a serious infection involving the submandibular, sublingual and submental spaces bilaterally. Ludwig's angina may extend into the pharyngeal and cervical spaces, and the swelling can compress the airway and cause dyspnoea (difficulty breathing). Collectively, the submandibular, sublingual and submental spaces are sometimes termed the perimandibular spaces, or the submaxillary space.
