= Dorsal lingual veins =

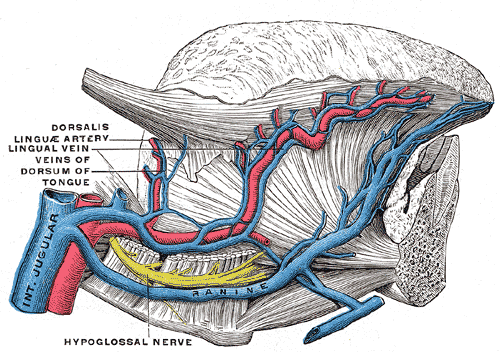
- Veins of the tongue. The hypoglossal nerve has been displaced downward in this preparation.

Details
- Drains to: Lingual vein
- Artery: Dorsal lingual branches of lingual artery

Identifiers
- Latin: venae dorsales linguae
- TA98: A12.3.05.010
- TA2: 4808
- FMA: 70842

The dorsal lingual veins are some of the lingual veins. They provide venous drainage to the dorsum of the tongue, and the sides of the tongue. Between the hyoglossus and genioglossus, dorsal lingual veins unite with those lingual veins that are venae comitantes of the lingual artery; these consolidated lingual veins then empty into the internal jugular vein proximal to the greater cornu of hyoid bone.
