= Farabeuf's triangle =

Area of the neck

Farabeuf's triangle is one of the triangles of the neck located in the upper portion of the neck where the bifurcation of the carotid artery can be seen. It is limited: the rear: the jugular vein; internal below and beyond: the facial vein; above and beyond: the hypoglossal nerve. This triangle is a small triangle within the carotid triangle, and serves as a reference to locate surgery elements that are in the carotid triangle.

The triangle of Farabeuf is bounded by the internal jugular vein (posterior), common facial vein (anterior-inferior) and hypoglossal nerve (anterior-superior). The jugulodigastric lymph node is commonly found within these boundaries, and drains the pharyngeal tonsil.
