= Sublingual vein =

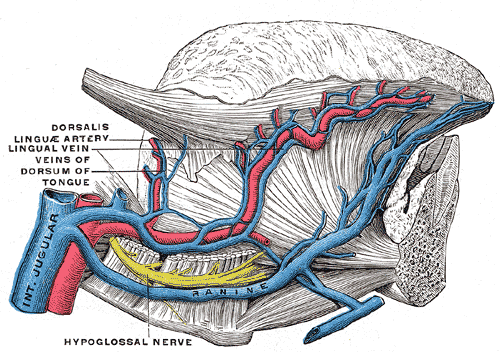
- Veins of the tongue. The hypoglossal nerve has been displaced downward in this preparation.

Details
- Drains to: Lingual vein
- Artery: Sublingual artery

Identifiers
- Latin: vena sublingualis
- TA98: A12.3.05.012
- TA2: 4810
- FMA: 50836

The sublingual vein is a vein which drains the tongue.
