= Lesser Triangle =

In anatomy the Lesser Triangle is a region contained within the Submandibular triangle. Its boundaries are the Hypoglossal Nerve, and the Anterior and Posterior belly of the Digastric muscle. This triangle was named after a German surgeon named Ladislaus Leon Lesser, who lived from 1846 to 1925
