= Ludwig's angina =

Form of severe cellulitis of the mouth floor

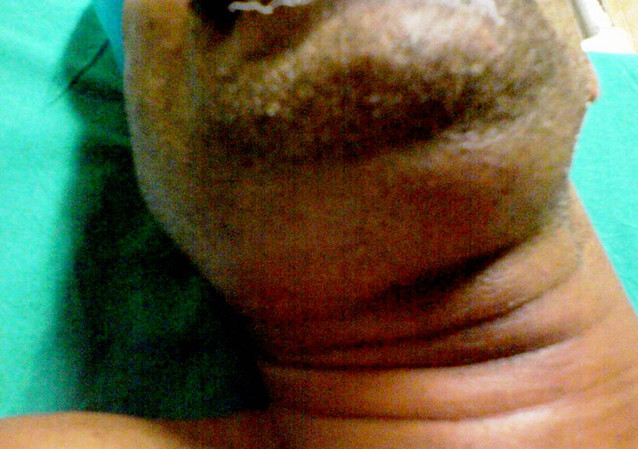
- Swelling in the submandibular area in a person with Ludwig's angina.
- Specialty: Otorhinolaryngology, oral and maxillofacial surgery
- Symptoms: Fever, pain, a raised tongue, trouble swallowing, neck swelling
- Complications: Airway compromise
- Usual onset: Rapid
- Risk factors: Dental infection
- Diagnostic method: Based on symptoms and examination, CT scan
- Treatment: Antibiotics, corticosteroids, endotracheal intubation, tracheostomy

Ludwig's angina is a type of severe cellulitis involving the floor of the mouth and is often caused by bacterial sources. Early in the infection, the floor of the mouth raises due to swelling, leading to difficulty swallowing saliva. As a result, patients may present with drooling and difficulty speaking. As the condition worsens, the airway may be compromised and hardening of the spaces on both sides of the tongue may develop. Overall, this condition has a rapid onset over a few hours.

The majority of cases follow a dental infection. Other causes include a parapharyngeal abscess, mandibular fracture, cut or piercing inside the mouth, or submandibular salivary stones. The infection spreads through the connective tissue of the floor of the mouth and is normally caused by infectious and invasive organisms such as Streptococcus, Staphylococcus, and Bacteroides.

Prevention is by appropriate dental care including management of dental infections. Initial treatment is generally with broad-spectrum antibiotics and corticosteroids. In more advanced cases endotracheal intubation or tracheostomy may be required.

With the advent of antibiotics in 1940s, improved oral and dental hygiene, and more aggressive surgical approaches for treatment, the risk of death due to Ludwig's angina has significantly reduced. It is named after a German physician, Wilhelm Frederick von Ludwig, who first described this condition in 1836.

== Signs and symptoms ==
Ludwig's angina is a form of severe, widespread cellulitis of the floor of the mouth, usually with bilateral involvement. Infection is usually primarily within the submandibular space, and the sublingual and submental spaces can also be involved. It presents with an acute onset and spreads very rapidly, therefore early diagnosis and immediate treatment planning is vital and lifesaving. The external signs may include bilateral lower facial swelling around the jaw and upper neck. Signs inside the mouth may include elevation of the floor of mouth due to sublingual space involvement and posterior displacement of the tongue, creating the potential for a compromised airway. Additional symptoms may include painful neck swelling, drooling, tooth pain, dysphagia, shortness of breath, fever, and general malaise. Stridor, trismus, and cyanosis may also be seen when an impending airway crisis is nearing.

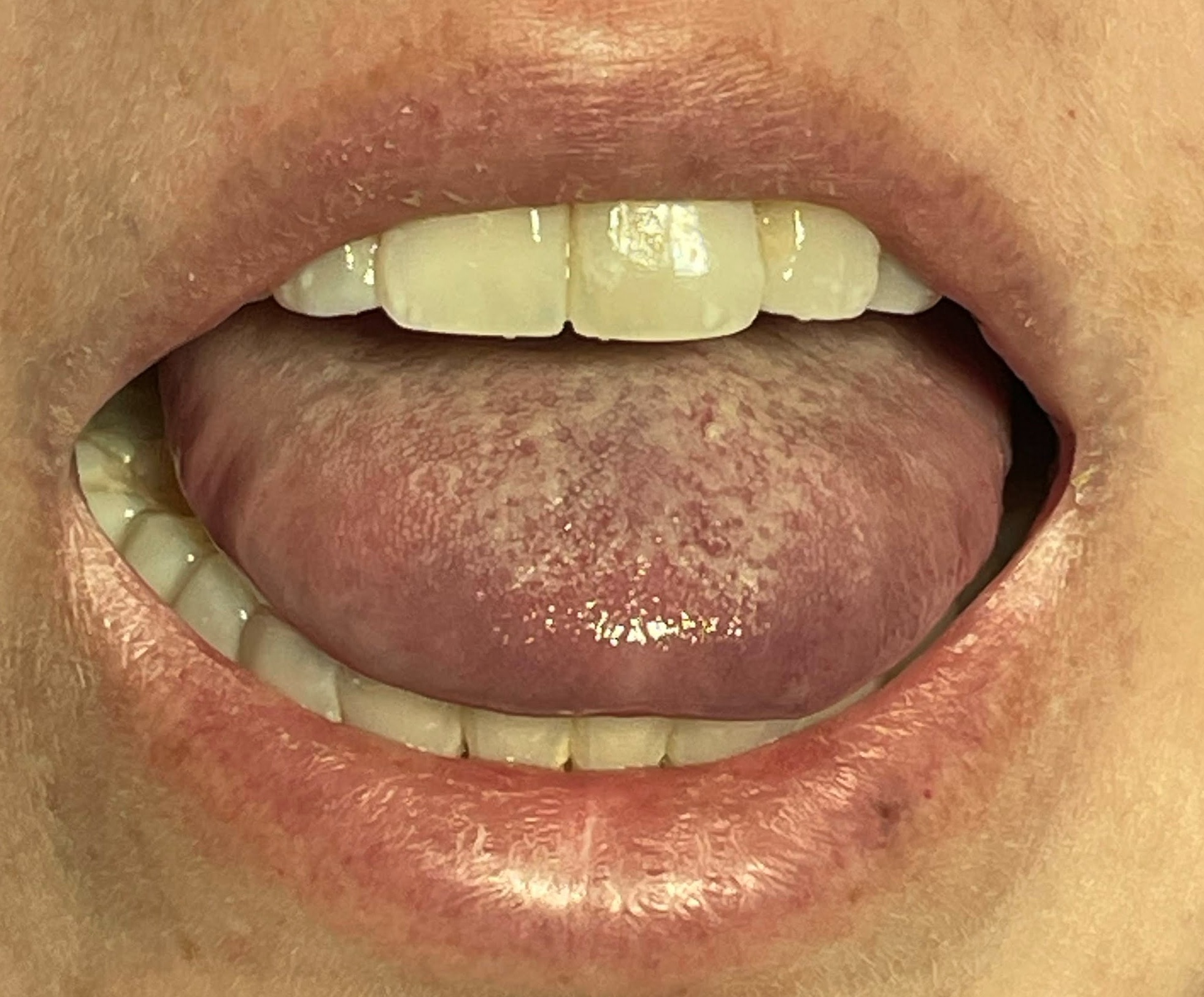
Elevated tongue due to Ludwig's angina

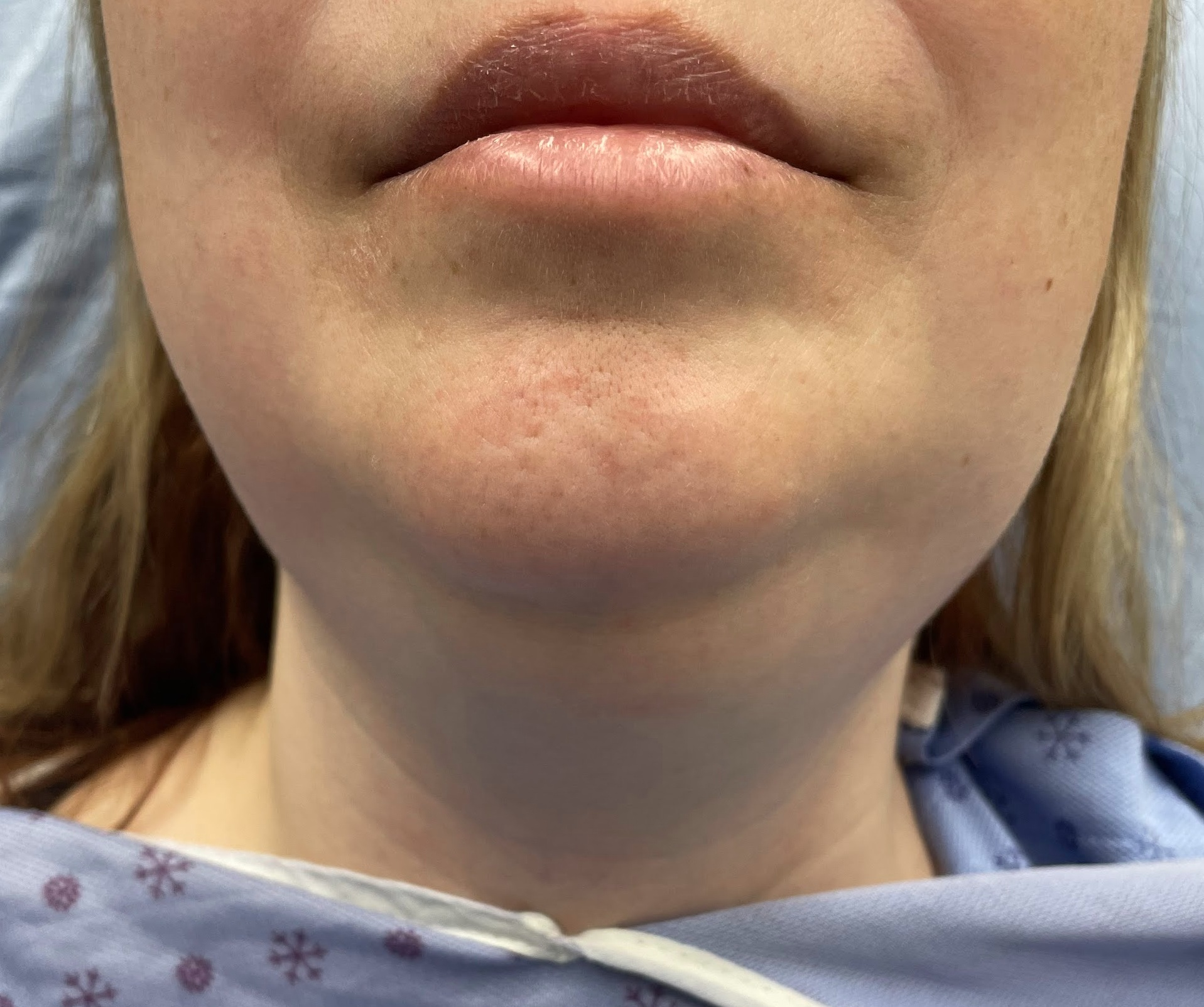
Swollen and hard area under the chin due to Ludwig's angina

== Causes ==
The most prevalent cause of Ludwig's angina is dental related, accounting for approximately 75–90% of cases. Infections of the lower second and third molars are usually implicated due to their roots extending below the mylohyoid muscle. Periapical abscesses of these teeth also result in lingual cortical penetration, leading to submandibular infection.

Other causes such as oral ulcerations, infections secondary to oral malignancy, mandible fractures, sialolithiasis-related submandibular gland infections, and penetrating injuries of the mouth floor have also been documented as potential causes of Ludwig's angina. Patients with systemic illness, such as diabetes mellitus, malnutrition, compromised immune system, and organ transplantation are also commonly predisposed to Ludwig's angina. A review reporting the incidence of illnesses associated with Ludwig angina found that 18% of cases involved diabetes mellitus, 9% involved acquired immune deficiency syndrome, and another 5% were human immunodeficiency virus (HIV) positive.

== Diagnosis ==
Infections originating in the roots of teeth can be identified with a dental X-ray. A CT scan of the neck with contrast material is used to identify deep neck space infections. If there is suspicion of the infection of the chest cavity, a chest scan is sometimes done.

Angioneurotic oedema, lingual carcinoma and sublingual hematoma formation following anticoagulation should be ruled out as possible diagnoses.

=== Microbiology ===
There are a few methods that can be used for determining the microbiology of Ludwig's angina. Traditionally, a culture sample is collected although it has some limitations, primarily being the time-consuming and sometimes unreliable results if the culture is not processed correctly. Ludwig's angina is most often found to be polymicrobial and anaerobic. Some of the commonly found microbes are Viridans streptococci, Staphylococci, Peptostreptococci, Prevotella, Porphyromonas and Fusobacterium.

== Treatment ==
For each patient, the treatment plan should be consider the patient's stage of infection, airway control, and comorbidities. Other things to consider include physician experience, available resources, and personnel are critical factors in formulation of a treatment plan. There are four principles that guide the treatment of Ludwig's angina: sufficient airway management, early and aggressive antibiotic therapy, incision and drainage for any who fail medical management or form localized abscesses, and adequate nutrition and hydration support.

=== Airway management ===
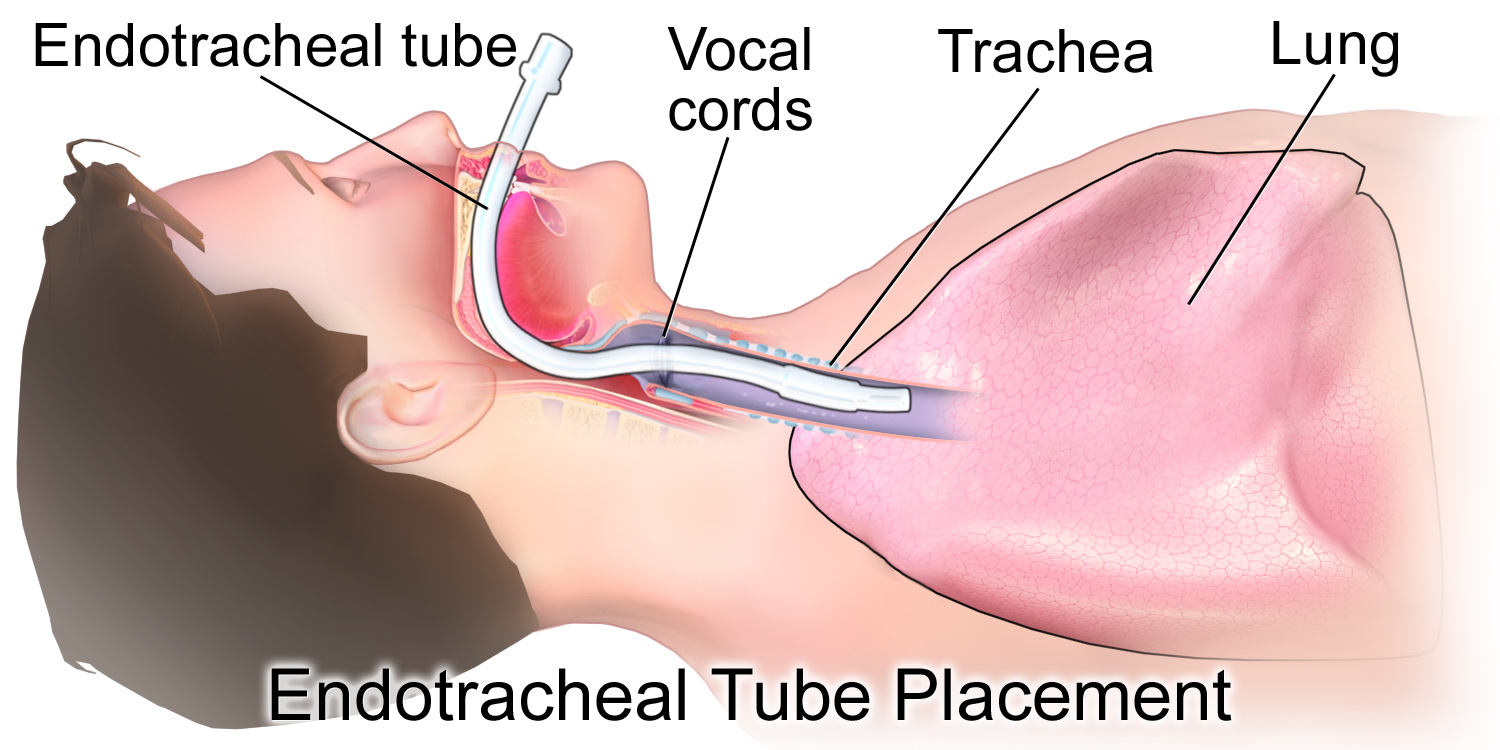
Placement of an endotracheal tube to aid breathing

Airway management has been found to be the most important factor in treating patients with Ludwig's angina, i.e. it is the "primary therapeutic concern". Airway compromise is known to be the leading cause of death from Ludwig's angina.

- The basic method to achieve this is to allow the patient to sit in an upright position with supplemental oxygen provided by masks or nasal prongs. Patient's airway can rapidly deteriorate and therefore close observation and preparation for more invasive methods such as endotracheal intubation or tracheostomy if needed is vital.
- If the oxygen saturation levels are adequate and antimicrobials have been given, simple airway observation can be done. This is a suitable method to adopt in the management of children, as a retrospective study described that only 10% of children required airway control. However, a tracheostomy was performed on 52% of those affected with Ludwig's angina over 15 years old.
- If more invasive or surgical airway control is necessary, there are multiple things to consider
  - Flexible nasotracheal intubation require skills and experience.
  - If nasotracheal intubation is not possible, cricothyrotomy and tracheostomy under local anaesthetic can be done. This procedure is carried out on patients with advanced stage of Ludwig's angina.
  - Endotracheal intubation has been found to be in association with high failure rate with acute deterioration in respiratory status.
  - Elective tracheostomy is described as a safer and more logical method of airway management in patients with fully developed Ludwig's angina.
  - Fibre-optic nasoendoscopy can also be used, especially for patients with floor of mouth swellings.

=== Antibiotics ===
- Antibiotic therapy is empirical, it is given until culture and sensitivity results are obtained. The empirical therapy should be effective against both aerobic and anaerobic bacteria species commonly involved in Ludwig's angina. Only when culture and sensitivity results return should therapy be tailored to the specific requirements of the patient.
  - Empirical coverage should consist of either a penicillin with a B-lactamase inhibitor such as amoxicillin/ticarcillin with clavulanic acid or a Beta-lactamase resistant antibiotic such as cefoxitin, cefuroxime, imipenem or meropenem. This should be given in combination with a drug effective against anaerobes such as clindamycin or metronidazole.
- Parenteral antibiotics are suggested until the patient is no longer febrile for at least 48 hours. Oral therapy can then commence to last for two weeks, with amoxicillin with clavulanic acid, clindamycin, ciprofloxacin, trimethoprim-sulfamethoxazole, or metronidazole.

=== Incision and drainage ===
- Surgical incision and drainage are the main methods in managing severe and complicated deep neck infections that fail to respond to medical management within 48 hours.
- It is indicated in cases of:
  - Airway compromise
  - Septicaemia
  - Deteriorating condition
  - Descending infection
  - Diabetes mellitus
  - Palpable or radiographic evidence of abscess formation
- Bilateral submandibular incisions should be carried out in addition to a midline submental incision. Access to the supramylohyoid spaces can be gained by blunt dissection through the mylohyoid muscle from below.
- Penrose drains are recommended in both supramylohyoid and inframylohyoid spaces bilaterally. In addition, through and through drains from the submandibular space to the submental space on both sides should be placed as well.
- The incision and drainage process is completed with the debridement of necrotic tissue and thorough irrigation.
- It is necessary to mark drains in order to identify their location. They should be sutured with loops as well so it will be possible to advance them without re-anaesthetizing the patient while drains are re-sutured to the skin.
- An absorbent dressing is then applied. A bandnet dressing retainer can be constructed so as to prevent the use of tape.

=== Other things to consider ===
==== Nutritional support ====
Adequate nutrition and hydration support is essential in any patient following surgery, particularly young children. In this case, pain and swelling in the neck region would usually cause difficulties in eating or swallowing, hence reducing patient's food and fluid intake. Patients must therefore be well-nourished and hydrated to promote wound healing and to fight off infection.

==== Post-operative care ====
Extubation, which is the removal of endotracheal tube to liberate the patient from mechanical ventilation, should only be done when the patient's airway is proved to be patent, allowing adequate breathing. This is indicated by a decrease in swelling and patient's capability of breathing adequately around an uncuffed endotracheal tube with the lumen blocked.

During the hospital stay, patient's condition will be closely monitored by:

- carrying out cultures and sensitivity tests to decide if any changes need to be made to patient's antibiotic course
- observing for signs of further infection or sepsis including fevers, hypotension, and tachycardia
- monitoring patient's white blood cell count – a decrease implies effective and sufficient drainage
- repeating CT scans to prove patient's restored health status or if infection extends, the anatomical areas that are affected.

== Etymology ==
The term "angina", is derived from the Latin word angere, which means "choke"; and the Greek word ankhone, which means "strangle". Placing it into context, Ludwig's angina refers to the feeling of strangling and choking, secondary to obstruction of the airway, which is the most serious potential complication of this condition.

== See also ==
- Anticor
