= Jugulodigastric lymph node =

Lymph nodes of the neck

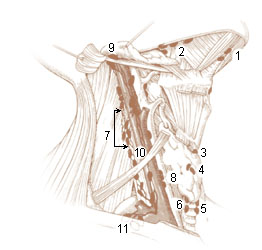
- Jugulodigastric are numbered 9 (at top): Deep Lymph Nodes: 1. Submental; 2. Submandibular (Submaxillary); Anterior Cervical Lymph Nodes (Deep): 3. Prelaryngeal; 4. Thyroid; 5. Pretracheal; 6. Paratracheal; Deep Cervical Lymph Nodes: 7. Lateral jugular 8. Anterior jugular 9. Jugulodigastric; Inferior Deep Cervical Lymph Nodes: 10. Juguloomohyoid; 11. Supraclavicular (scalene)

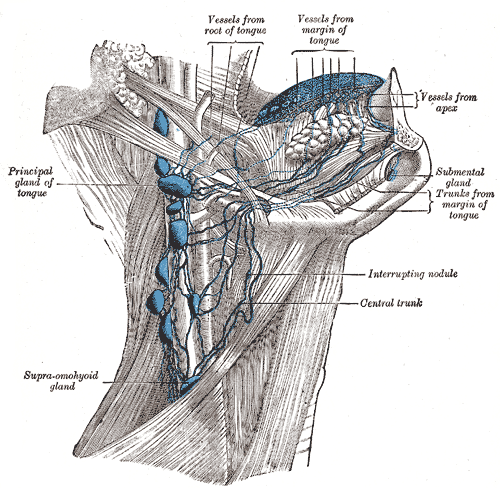
- Lymphatics of the tongue. (Jugulodigastric lymph node visible but not labeled.)

Details
- System: Lymphatic system

Identifiers
- Latin: nodus lymphoideus jugulodigastricus

The jugulodigastric lymph nodes are large lymph nodes of the neck.

== Structure ==
The jugulodigastric lymph nodes are found in the proximity of where the posterior belly of the digastric muscle crosses the internal jugular vein. Nodes are typically around 15 mm in length in adults, and decrease in size during old age. They tend to be some of the largest lymph nodes in the cervical chain due to their significant lymphatic drainage.

== Function ==
The jugulodigastric lymph nodes are the first to receive lymphatic drainage from face, mouth, pharynx, and tonsils.

== Clinical significance ==
Enlarged tender jugulodigastric nodes, if accompanying exudative pharyngitis, is likely to be of Streptococcal etiology. Enlarged jugulodigastric lymph nodes are also commonly found in tonsillitis.
