= Beclard Triangle =

Béclard's triangle is an area whose boundaries are the posterior border of the hyoglossus, the posterior belly of the digastric muscle and the greater horn of the hyoid bone.
