= Anticor =

Inflammatory disease in horses

An anticor, also known as anticoeur or avant-cœur, among farriers, is a dangerous swelling or inflammation in a horse's breast, of the size and shape of an apple, just opposite the heart. The term literally means anti heart or before heart.

The swelling may appear as a hard tumor, slow to develop, or as an inflammation. A traditional remedy, in the first case, involves splitting the skin along the breadth of the tumor, allowing the matter contained to escape, and stopping the hemorrhage by using an amadou or a hot iron. This kind of operation is best done by a veterinarian. If the tumor is inflammatory, one resorts to an oil of pompillion, an ointment made of buds of black poplar, lard and sheets of poppy, belladonna, etc. If it has formed an abscess, one first applies a soft poultice.^{[1]}

In pre-modern medicine, this was thought to be caused by a sanguine and bilious humour. The disease has also been erroneously attributed to the heart, whence it was called by Jacques de Solleysell a swelling of the pericardium, whereas it is really an inflammation in the gullet and throat.^{[2]}

In humans, this is called Ludwig's angina, or squinancy.
