= Occipital triangle =

Anatomical region of the neck

- Occipital triangle

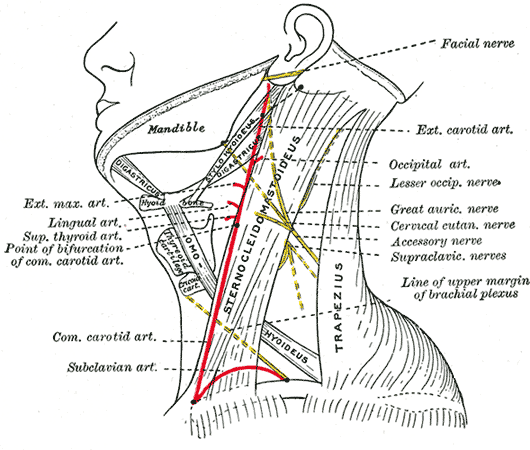
- Side of neck, showing chief surface markings. (Nerves are yellow, arteries are red.)

Details

Identifiers
- Latin: trigonum occipitale
- TA2: 242
- FMA: 81001

The occipital triangle, the larger division of the posterior triangle, is bounded, in front, by the Sternocleidomastoideus; behind, by the Trapezius; below, by the Omohyoideus.

Its floor is formed from above downward by the Splenius capitis, Levator scapulæ, and the Scalenus medius and posterior.

It is covered by the skin, the superficial and deep fasciæ, and by the Platysma below.

The accessory nerve is directed obliquely across the space from the Sternocleidomastoideus, which it pierces, to the under surface of the Trapezius; below, the supraclavicular nerves and the transverse cervical vessels and the upper part of the brachial plexus cross the space.

The roof of this triangle is formed by the cutaneous nerves of cervical plexus and the external jugular vein and platysma muscle.

A chain of lymph glands is also found running along the posterior border of the Sternocleidomastoideus, from the mastoid process to the root of the neck.

== Gallery ==
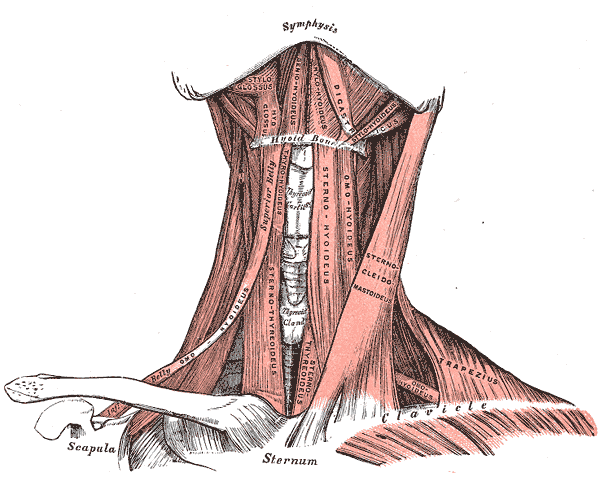
Muscles of the neck. Anterior view.

== See also ==
- Posterior triangle of the neck
