= Subclavian triangle =

- Subclavian triangle

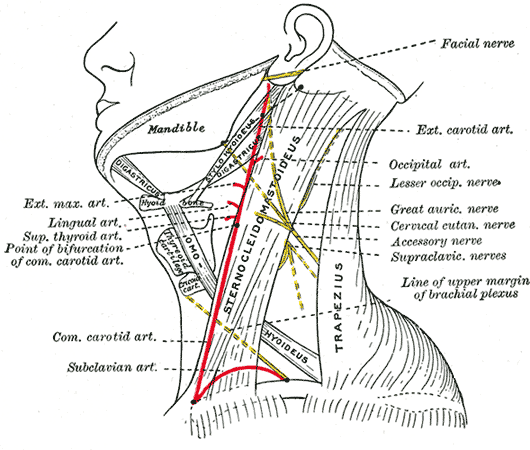
- Side of neck, showing chief surface markings. (Nerves are yellow, arteries are red.)

Details

Identifiers
- Latin: trigonum omoclaviculare
- TA98: A01.2.02.010
- TA2: 241
- FMA: 75021

The subclavian triangle (or supraclavicular triangle, omoclavicular triangle, Ho's triangle), the smaller division of the posterior triangle of the neck, is bounded, above, by the inferior belly of the omohyoid; below, by the clavicle; its base is formed by the posterior border of the sternocleidomastoid.

Its floor is formed by the first rib with the first digitation of the serratus anterior.

The size of the subclavian triangle varies with the extent of attachment of the clavicular portions of the Sternocleidomastoid and Trapezius, and also with the height at which the Omohyoid crosses the neck.

Its height also varies according to the position of the arm, being diminished by raising the limb, on account of the ascent of the clavicle, and increased by drawing the arm downward, when that bone is depressed.

This space is covered by the integument, the superficial and deep fasciæ and the platysma, and crossed by the supraclavicular nerves.

Just above the level of the clavicle, the third portion of the subclavian artery curves lateralward and downward from the lateral margin of the scalenus anterior, across the first rib, to the axilla, and this is the situation most commonly chosen for ligaturing the vessel.

Sometimes this vessel rises as high as 4 cm. above the clavicle; occasionally, it passes in front of the Scalenus anterior, or pierces the fibers of that muscle.

The subclavian vein lies behind the clavicle, and is not usually seen in this space; but in some cases it rises as high as the artery, and has even been seen to pass with that vessel behind the Scalenus anterior.

The brachial plexus of nerves lies above the artery, and in close contact with it. Passing transversely behind the clavicle are the transverse scapular vessels; and traversing its upper angle in the same direction, the transverse cervical artery and vein.

The external jugular vein runs vertically downward behind the posterior border of the Sternocleidomastoideus, to terminate in the subclavian vein; it receives the transverse cervical and transverse scapular veins, which form a plexus in front of the artery, and occasionally a small vein which crosses the clavicle from the cephalic.

The small nerve to the subclavius also crosses this triangle about its middle, and some lymph glands are usually found in the space.

Enlarged nodes in this triangle irrespective of size are categorized at N3 in the TNM classification for nasopharyngeal carcinoma.

== Gallery ==
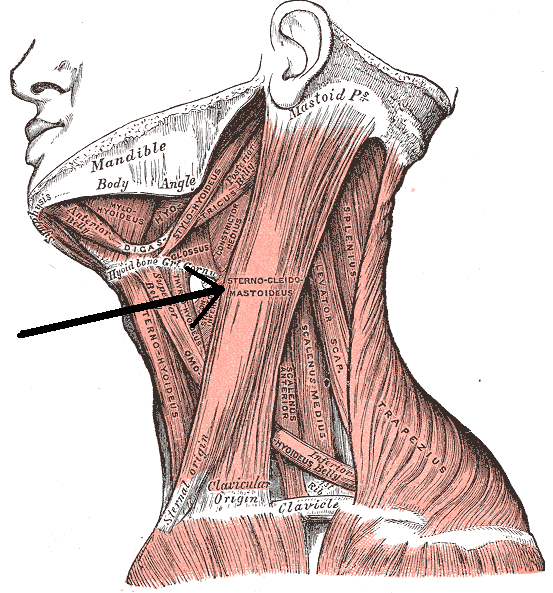
Sternocleidomastoid muscle

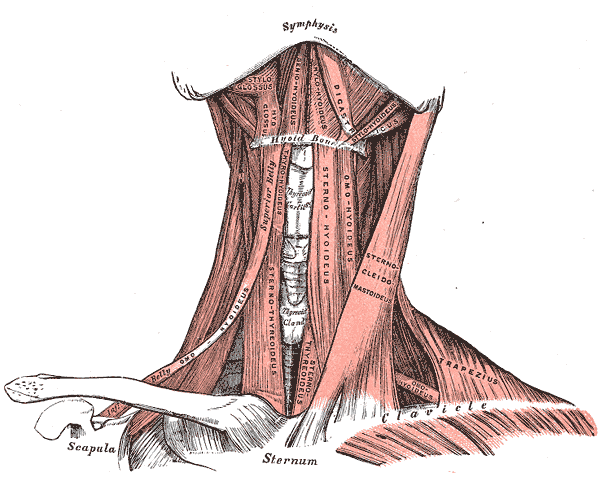
Muscles of the neck. Anterior view.

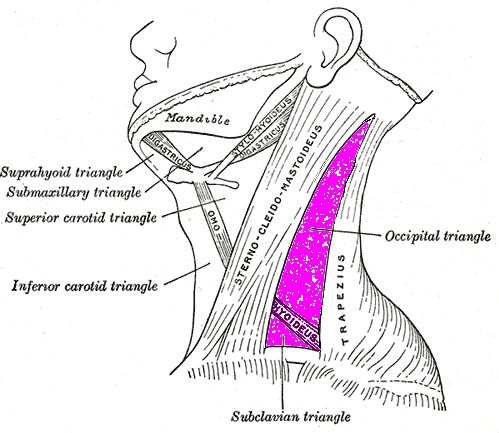
Posterior triangle of the neck labeled. (Anterior triangles to the left. Occipital triangle labeled at center left.) )

== See also ==
- Posterior triangle of the neck
