= Posterior triangle of the neck =

Anatomical region of the neck

- Posterior triangle

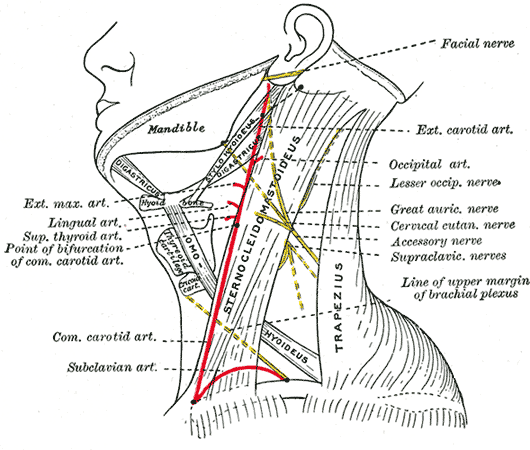
- Side of neck, showing chief surface markings. (Nerves are yellow, arteries are red.)

Details

Identifiers
- Latin: trigonum cervicale posterius trigonum colli posterius regio cervicalis posterior
- TA98: A01.2.02.009
- TA2: 239
- FMA: 57778

The posterior triangle (or lateral cervical region) is a region of the neck.

== Boundaries ==
The posterior triangle has the following boundaries:

Apex: Union of the sternocleidomastoid and the trapezius muscles at the superior nuchal line of the occipital bone

Anteriorly: Posterior border of the sternocleidomastoideus

Posteriorly: Anterior border of the trapezius

Inferiorly: Middle one third of the clavicle

Roof: Investing layer of the deep cervical fascia

Floor: (From superior to inferior)

1) M. semispinalis capitis

2) M. splenius capitis

3) M. levator scapulae

4) M. scalenus posterior

5) M. scalenus medius

== Divisions ==
The posterior triangle is crossed, about 2.5 cm above the clavicle, by the inferior belly of the omohyoid muscle, which divides the space into two triangles:

- an upper or occipital triangle
- a lower or subclavian triangle (or supraclavicular triangle)

== Contents ==
A) Nerves and plexuses:

- Spinal accessory nerve (Cranial Nerve XI)
- Branches of cervical plexus
- Roots and trunks of brachial plexus
- Phrenic nerve (C3,4,5)

B) Vessels:

- Subclavian artery (Third part)
- Transverse cervical artery
- Suprascapular artery
- Terminal part of external jugular vein

C) Lymph nodes:

- Occipital
- Supraclavicular

D) Muscles:

- Inferior belly of omohyoid muscle
- Anterior Scalene
- Middle Scalene
- Posterior Scalene
- Levator Scapulae Muscle
- Splenius

== Clinical significance ==
The accessory nerve (CN XI) is particularly vulnerable to damage during lymph node biopsy. Damage results in an inability to shrug the shoulders or raise the arm above the head, particularly due to compromised trapezius muscle innervation.

The external jugular vein's superficial location within the posterior triangle also makes it vulnerable to injury.

== See also ==
- Anterior triangle of the neck
