= Submental triangle =

Part of the human neck

- Submental triangle

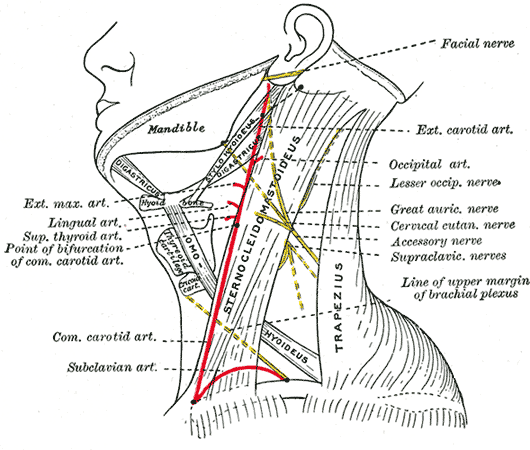
- Side of neck, showing chief surface markings (nerves are yellow, arteries are red)

Details

Identifiers
- Latin: trigonum submentale
- TA98: A01.2.02.006
- TA2: 233
- FMA: 61604

The submental triangle (or suprahyoid triangle) is a division of the anterior triangle of the neck.

== Boundaries ==
It is limited to:

- Lateral (away from the midline), formed by the anterior belly of the digastricus
- Medial (towards the midline), formed by the midline of the neck between the mandible and the hyoid bone
- Inferior (below), formed by the body of the hyoid bone
- Floor is formed by the mylohyoideus
- Roof is formed by investing layer of deep cervical fascia

== Contents ==
It contains one or two lymph glands, the submental lymph nodes (three or four in number) and Submental veins and commencement of anterior jugular veins.

(The contents of the triangle actually lie in the superficial fascia over the roof of submental triangle)

== Additional images ==
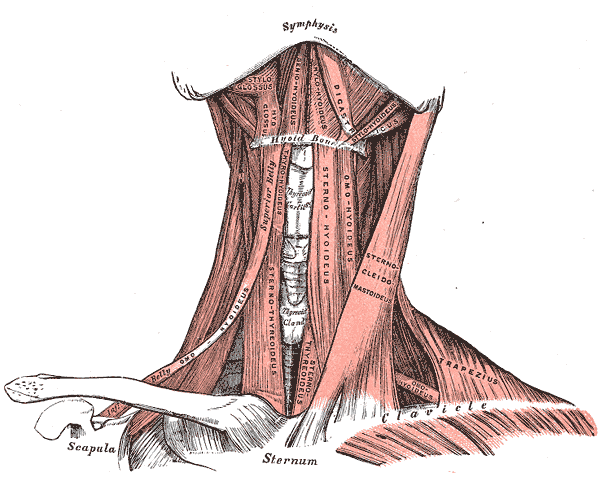
Muscles of the neck. Anterior view.

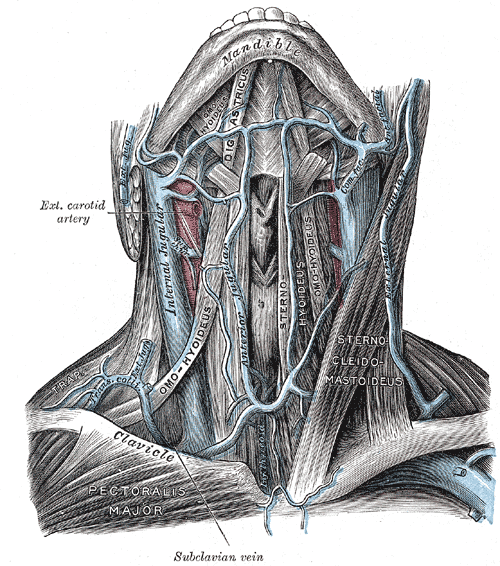
The veins of the neck, viewed from in front.

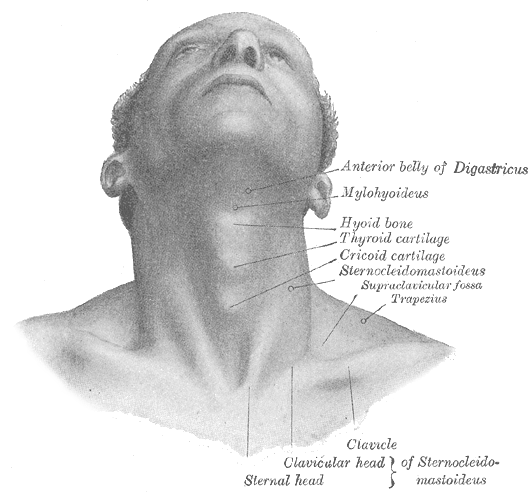
Front view of neck.

The triangles of the neck. (Anterior triangles to the left; posterior triangles to the right. Suprahyoid labeled at left.)

== See also ==
- Anterior triangle of the neck
- Submental space
