= Lingual veins =

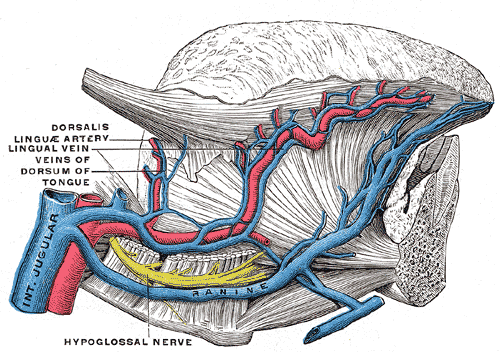
- Veins of the tongue. (Lingual vein labeled at left.)

Details
- Drains from: Tongue
- Drains to: Internal jugular vein
- Artery: Lingual artery

Identifiers
- Latin: vena lingualis
- TA98: A12.3.05.009
- TA2: 4807
- FMA: 14326

The lingual veins are veins of the tongue with two distinct courses: one group drains into the lingual vein, while another group drains either into the lingual artery, (common) facial vein, or internal jugular vein.

== Clinical significance ==
The lingual veins are clinically significant due to their ability to rapidly absorb drugs. For this reason, nitroglycerin is administered sublingually to patients experiencing angina pectoris.

== See also ==
- Deep lingual vein
- Dorsal lingual veins
