= Common facial vein =

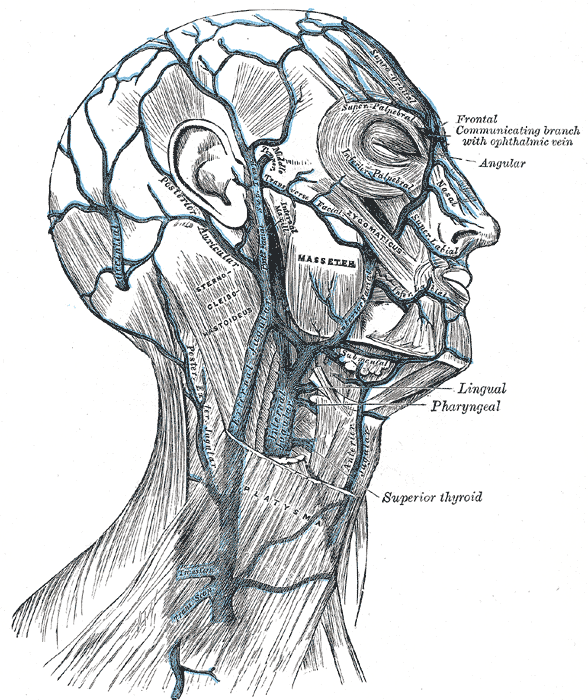
- Veins of the head and neck.

Details
- Source: facial vein
- Drains to: jugular vein

The facial vein usually unites with the anterior branch of the retromandibular vein to form the common facial vein, which crosses the external carotid artery and enters the internal jugular vein at a variable point below the hyoid bone.

From near its termination a communicating branch often runs down the anterior border of the sternocleidomastoideus to join the lower part of the anterior jugular vein.

The common facial vein is not present in all individuals.
