= Mylohyoid muscle =

Paired muscle of the neck

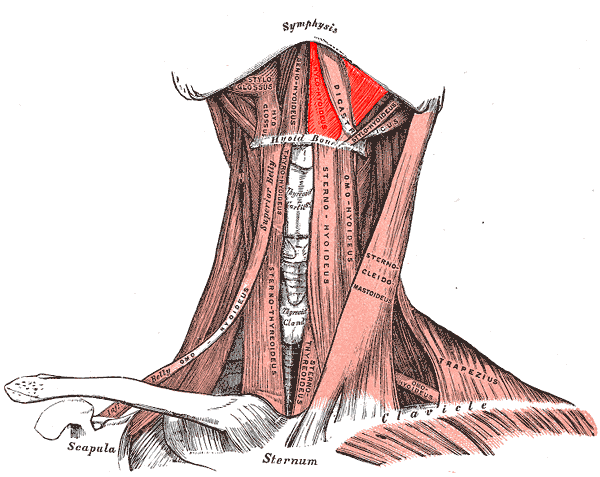
- Muscles of the neck seen from the front (mylohyoid muscle colored in bright red)

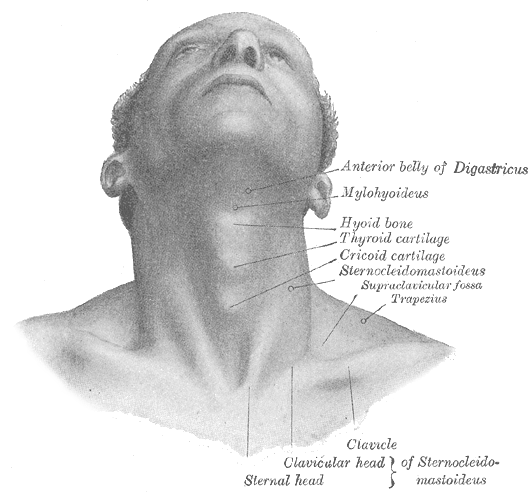
- Surface anatomy of the neck seen from the front (mylohyoid muscle labeled at right, second from top)

Details
- Origin: Mylohyoid line (mandible)
- Insertion: Body of hyoid bone and median ridge
- Artery: Mylohyoid branch of inferior alveolar artery and submental artery of facial artery
- Nerve: Mylohyoid nerve, from inferior alveolar branch of mandibular nerve
- Actions: Raises oral cavity floor, elevates hyoid, elevates tongue, depresses mandible

Identifiers
- Latin: musculus mylohyoideus
- TA98: A04.2.03.006
- TA2: 2165
- FMA: 46320

The mylohyoid muscle or diaphragma oris is a paired muscle of the neck. It runs from the mandible to the hyoid bone, forming the floor of the oral cavity of the mouth. It is named after its two attachments near the molar teeth. It forms the floor of the submental triangle. It elevates the hyoid bone and the tongue, important during swallowing and speaking.

== Structure ==
The mylohyoid muscle is flat and triangular, and is situated immediately superior to the anterior belly of the digastric muscle. It is a pharyngeal muscle (derived from the first pharyngeal arch) and classified as one of the suprahyoid muscles. Together, the paired mylohyoid muscles form a muscular floor for the oral cavity of the mouth.

The two mylohyoid muscles arise from the mandible at the mylohyoid line, which extends from the mandibular symphysis in front to the last molar tooth behind. The posterior fibers pass inferomedially and insert anteriorly at the body of the hyoid bone. The medial fibres of the two mylohyoid muscles unite in a midline raphe (where the two muscles intermesh).

The mylohyoid muscle separates the sublingual space from the submandibular space, which communicate via a lateral gap between the mylohyoid and hyoglossus muscles at the posterior free margin of mylohyoid muscle. The submandibular gland wraps around the edges of the mylohyoid, and is divided into superficial and deep lobes above and below the muscle.

=== Nerve supply ===
The mylohyoid muscle is supplied by a branch of the mandibular nerve, the inferior alveolar nerve. The mylohyoid nerve is a branch of the inferior alveolar nerve. The mylohyoid nerve emerges to give motor supply to the mylohyoid muscle.

=== Development ===
The mylohyoid muscles are derived from embryonic mesoderm, specifically the first pharyngeal arch.

=== Variations ===
The mylohyoid muscle may be united to or replaced by the anterior belly of the digastric muscle; accessory slips to other hyoid muscles are frequent. This median raphe is sometimes absent; the fibers of the two muscles are then continuous. Variations in the mylohyoid muscle itself are not common. Accessory mylohyoid muscles have been seen in some people, which have the same attachments, nerve supply, and function. The mylohyoid muscle may also be split into an anterior portion and a posterior portion, with the sublingual gland occupying the space between these portions.

An area of herniation of the sublingual gland, blood vessels, or fat, may be present, with studies reporting this in 10-50% of people.

== Function ==
The mylohyoid muscle elevates the hyoid bone and the tongue. This is particularly important during swallowing and speaking. Alternatively, if other muscles are used to keep the position of the hyoid bone fixed, then the mylohyoid muscle depresses the mandible. It also functions as reinforcing the floor of mouth.

== Clinical significance ==
The mylohyoid muscle may be imaged by CT or MRI. The mylohyoid separates the submandibular space below from the sublingual space above. Around the posterior border of the mylohoid muscle, these spaces communicate. Infections, especially odontogenic infections can spread from one space to the other via this communication, or alternatively penetrate the mylohyoid muscle, which is a poor barrier to the spread of infection. Because the attachment of the mylohyoid muscle (the mylohoid line of the mandible) becomes more superior towards the posterior of the mandible, posterior infected teeth are more likely to drain into the submandibular space, and infected anterior teeth are more likely to drain into the sublingual space, since the apices of the teeth are more likely to be below and above the mylohoid line respectively (see diagram).

== History ==
The mylohyoid muscle may also be known as the diaphragma oris. It is named after its two attachments near the molar teeth ("mylo" comes from the Greek word for "molar").

== Additional images ==
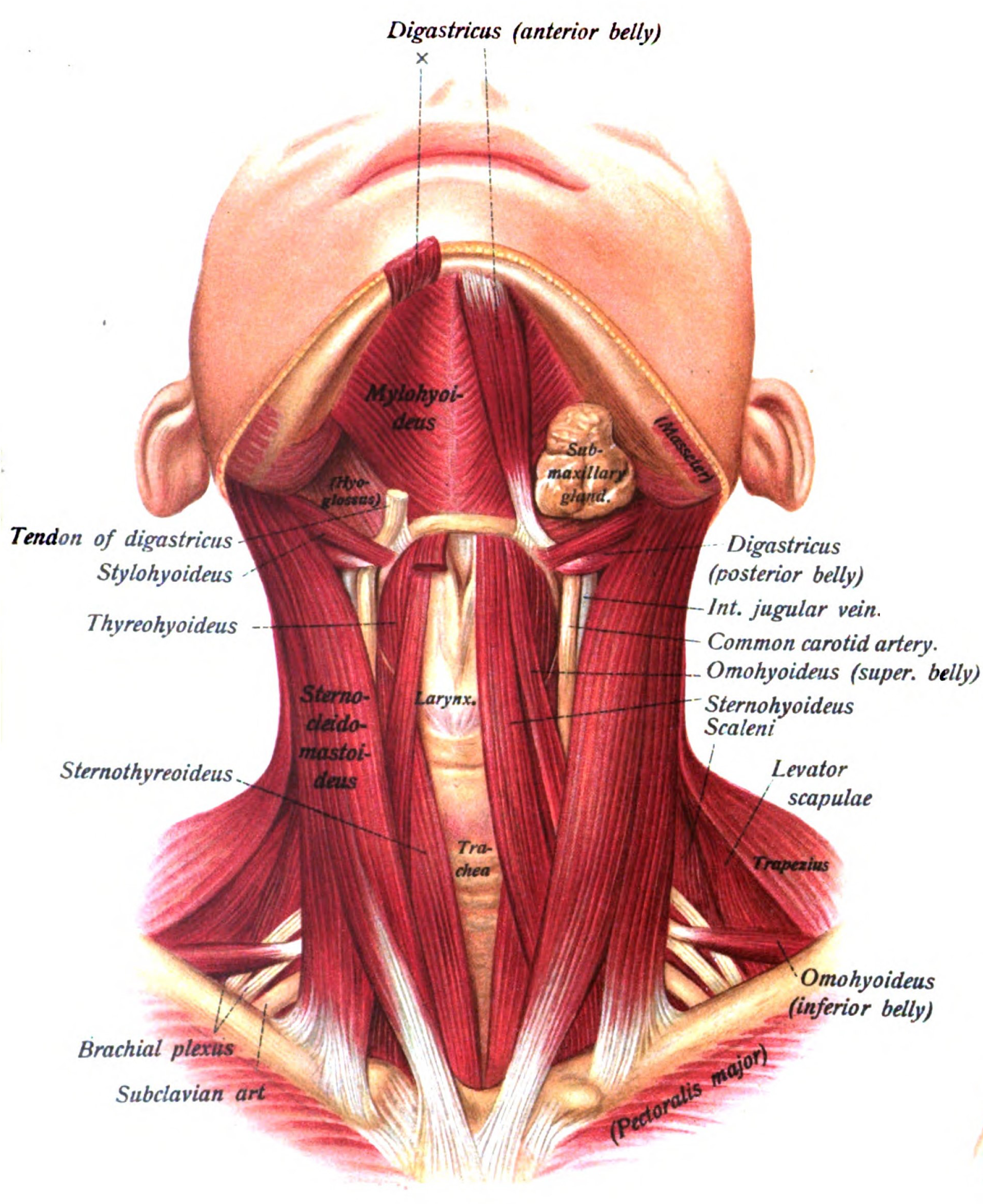
Anterior view

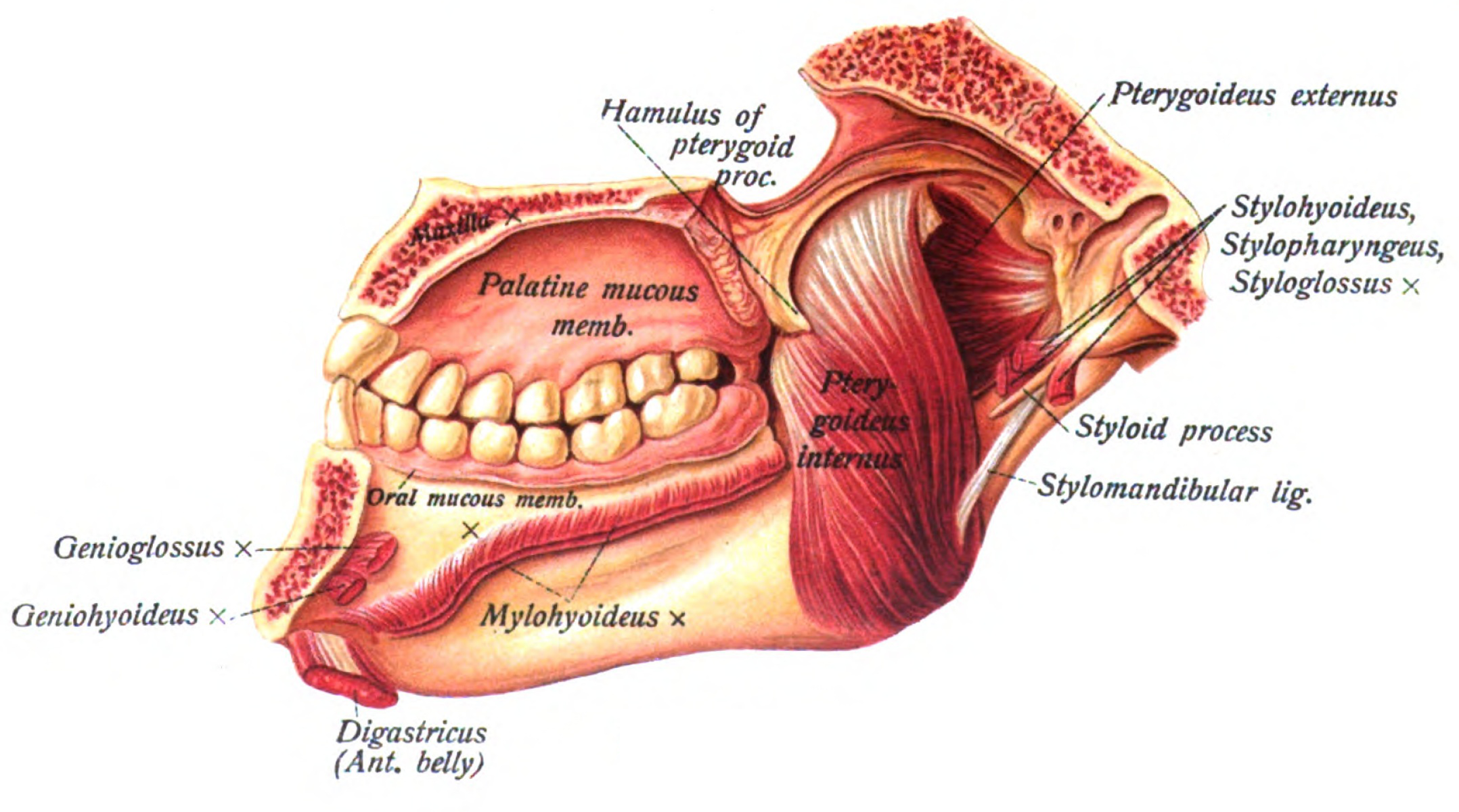
Medial view

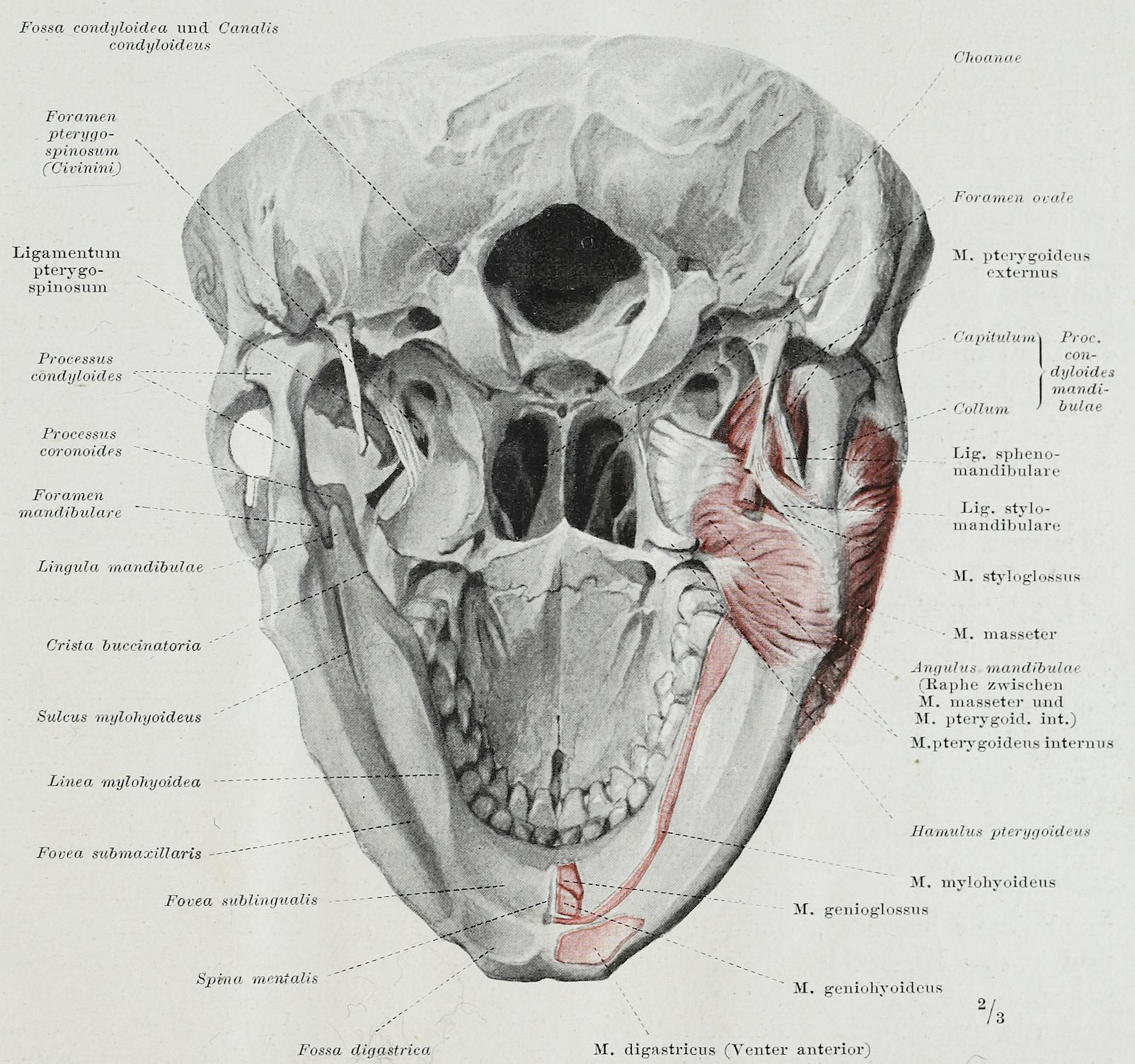
The origin of the mylohyoid muscle, inferior view.

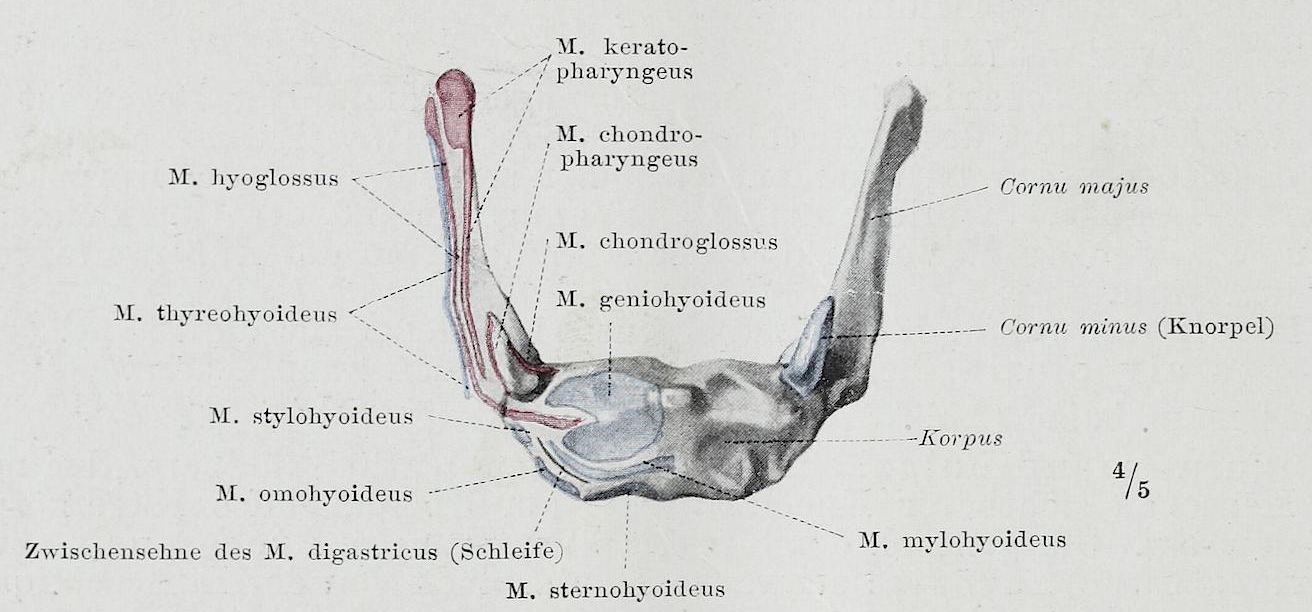
The insertion of the mylohyoid muscle on the hyoid bone.

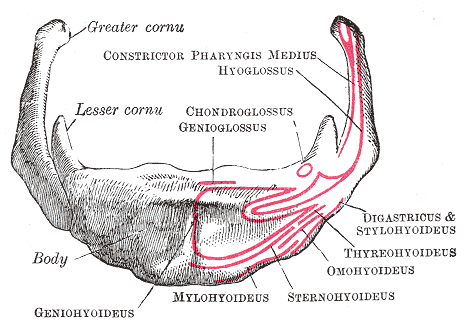
Hyoid bone. Anterior surface. Enlarged.

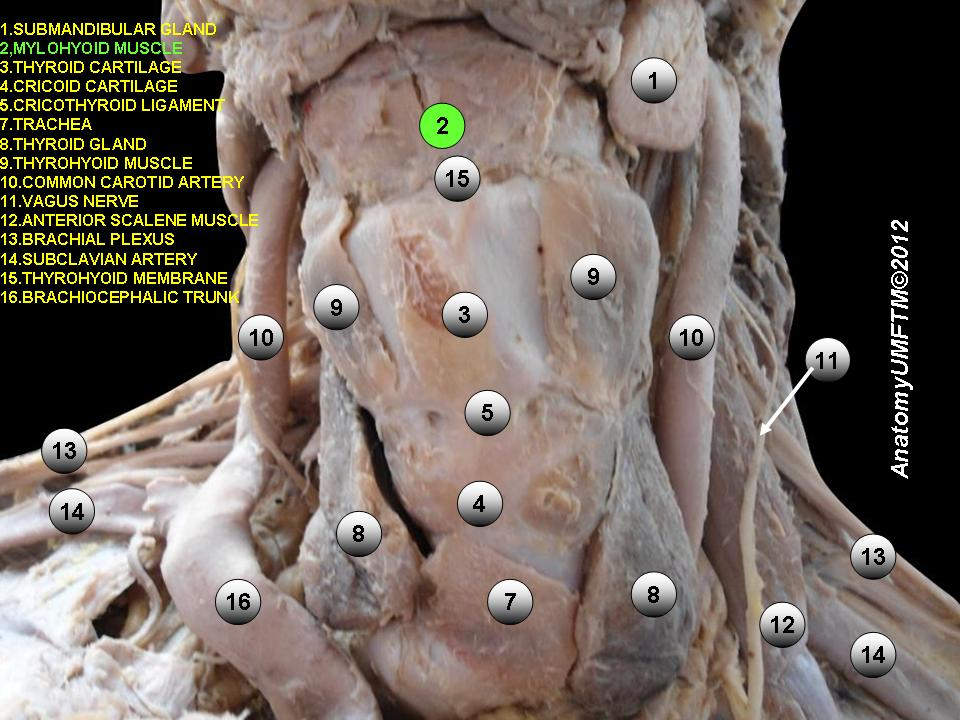
Mylohyoid muscle
