= Lingual artery =

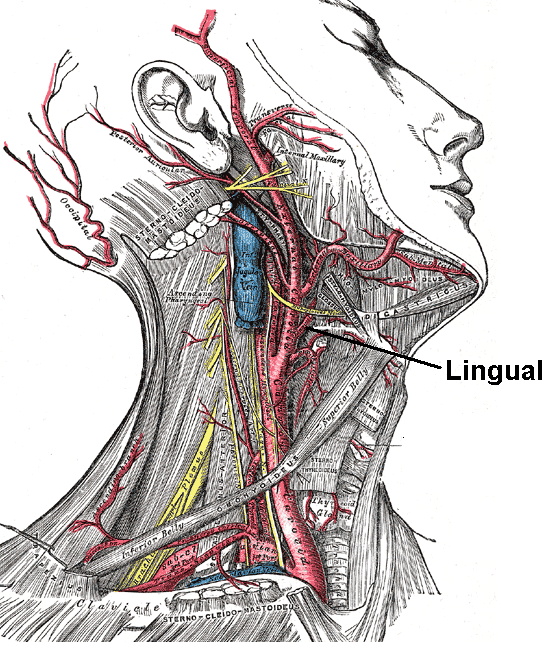
- Depiction of the neck with muscles and arteries shown. The lingual artery arises from the external carotid artery

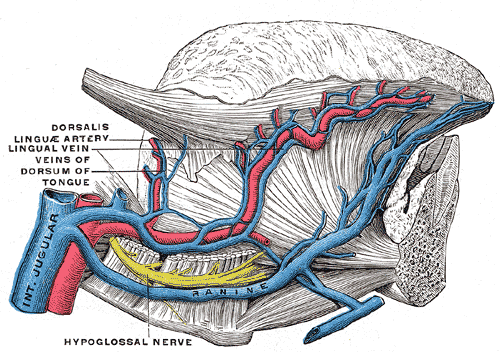
- Veins of the tongue. The hypoglossal nerve has been displaced downward in this preparation (lingual artery labeled at center left).

Details
- Source: External carotid artery
- Branches: Sublingual artery Deep lingual artery
- Vein: Lingual vein
- Supplies: Genioglossus

Identifiers
- Latin: arteria lingualis
- TA98: A12.2.05.015
- TA2: 4383
- FMA: 49526

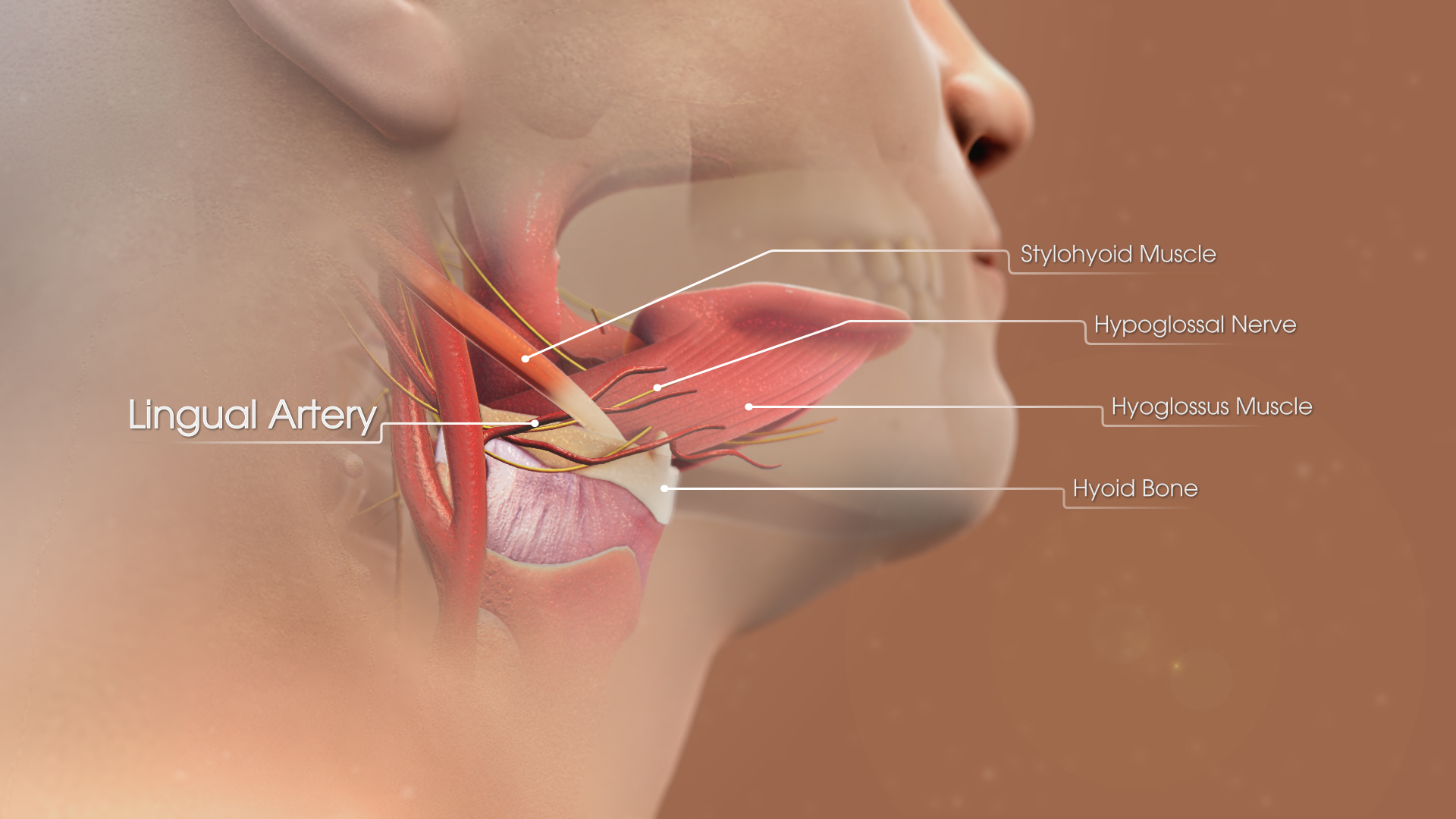
3D medical animation still shot of structure of lingual artery

The lingual artery arises from the external carotid artery between the superior thyroid artery and facial artery. It can be located easily in the tongue.

== Structure ==
The lingual artery first branches off from the external carotid artery. It runs obliquely upward and medially to the greater horns of the hyoid bone.

It then curves downward and forward, forming a loop which is crossed by the hypoglossal nerve. It then passes beneath the digastric muscle and stylohyoid muscle running horizontally forward, beneath the hyoglossus. This takes it through the sublingual space. Finally, ascending almost perpendicularly to the tongue, it turns forward on its lower surface as far as the tip of the tongue, now called the deep lingual artery (profunda linguae).

== Branches ==
The lingual artery gives 4 main branches: the deep lingual artery, the sublingual artery, the suprahyoid branch, and the dorsal lingual branch.

=== Deep lingual artery ===
The deep lingual artery (or ranine artery) is the terminal portion of the lingual artery after the sublingual artery is given off. As seen in the picture, it travels superiorly in a tortuous course along the under (ventral) surface of the tongue, below the longitudinalis inferior, and above the mucous membrane.

It lies on the lateral side of the genioglossus, the main large extrinsic tongue muscle, accompanied by the lingual nerve. However, as seen in the picture, the deep lingual artery passes inferior to the hyoglossus (the cut muscle on the bottom) while the lingual nerve (not pictured) passes superior to it (for a comparison, the hypoglossal nerve, pictured, passes superior to the hyoglossus). At the tip of the tongue, it is said to anastomose with the artery of the opposite side, but this is denied by Hyrtl. In the mouth, these vessels are placed one on either side of the frenulum linguæ.

=== Sublingual artery ===
The sublingual artery arises at the anterior margin of the hyoglossus, and runs forward between the genioglossus and mylohyoid muscle to the sublingual gland.

It supplies the gland and gives branches to the mylohyoideus and neighboring muscles, and to the mucous membrane of the mouth and gums.

One branch runs behind the alveolar process of the mandible in the substance of the gum to anastomose with a similar artery from the other side; another pierces the mylohyoideus and anastomoses with the submental branch of the facial artery.

=== Other branches ===
1. The suprahyoid branch of the lingual artery runs along the upper border of the hyoid bone, supplying oxygenated blood to the muscles attached to it and joining (anastomosing) with its fellow of the opposite side.
2. The dorsal lingual branches of lingual artery consist usually of two or three small branches which arise beneath the hyoglossus . They ascend medially to the back part of the dorsum of the tongue . They supply the mucous membranes, the glossopalatine arch, the tonsil, soft palate, and epiglottis; anastomosing with the vessels of the opposite side.

== Function ==
The lingual artery supplies the tongue. It also supplies the palatine tonsils.

== Additional images ==
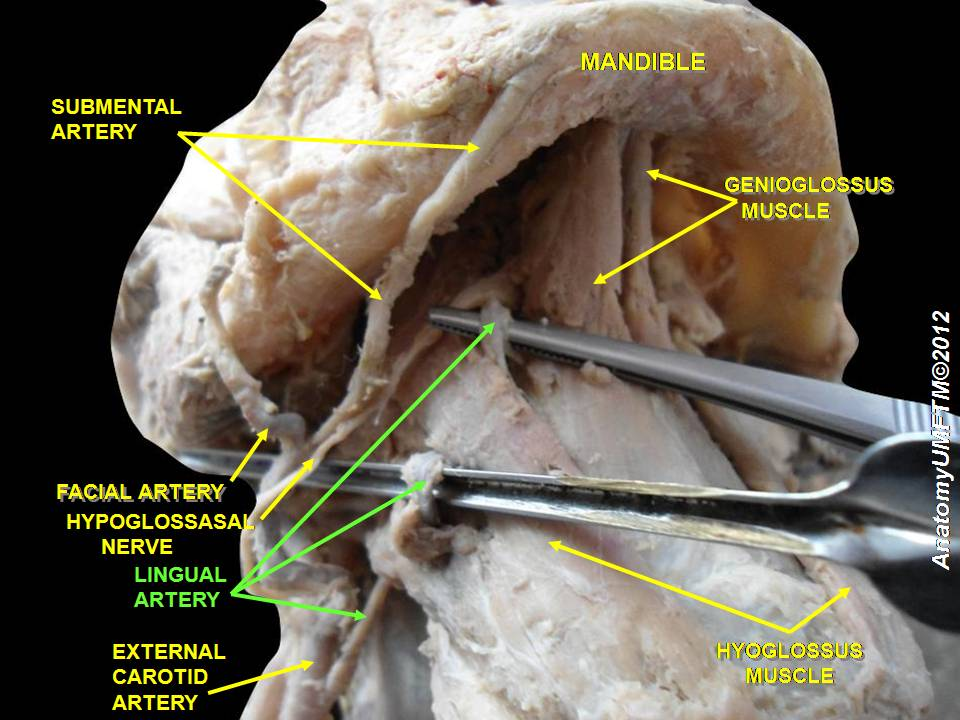
Lingual artery

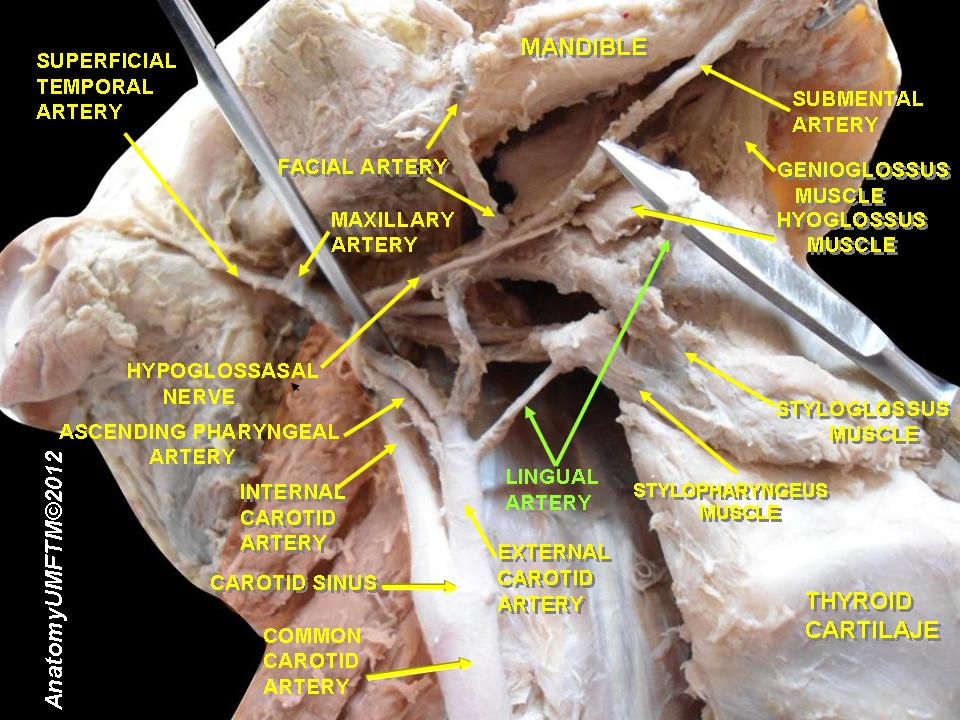
Lingual artery
