= Digastric muscle =

Small muscle located under the jaw in mammals

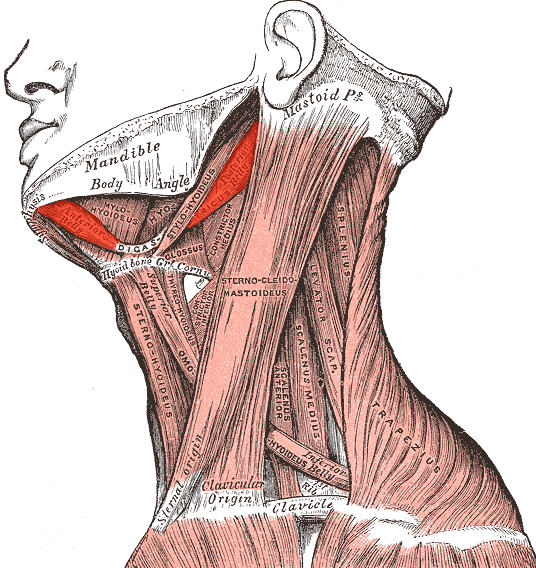
- Muscles of the neck. Lateral view.

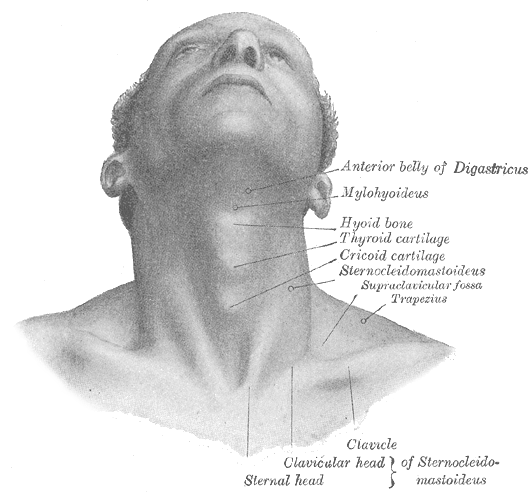
- Front view of neck.

Details
- Origin: Anterior belly - digastric fossa (mandible); posterior belly - mastoid notch of temporal bone
- Insertion: Intermediate tendon (hyoid bone)
- Artery: Anterior belly - Submental branch of facial artery; posterior belly - occipital artery
- Nerve: Anterior belly - mandibular division (V3) of the trigeminal (CN V) via the mylohyoid nerve; posterior belly - facial nerve (CN VII)
- Actions: Opens the jaw when the masseter and the temporalis are relaxed.

Identifiers
- Latin: musculus digastricus or musculus biventer mandibulae
- TA98: A04.2.03.002
- TA2: 2160
- FMA: 46291

The digastric muscle (also digastricus or musculus biventer mandibulae) (named digastric as it has two 'bellies') is a bilaterally paired suprahyoid muscle located under the jaw. Its posterior belly is attached to the mastoid notch of temporal bone, and its anterior belly is attached to the digastric fossa of mandible; the two bellies are united by an intermediate tendon which is held in a loop that attaches to the hyoid bone. The anterior belly is innervated via the mandibular nerve (cranial nerve V), and the posterior belly is innervated via the facial nerve (cranial nerve VII). It may act to depress the mandible or elevate the hyoid bone.

The term "digastric muscle" refers to this specific muscle even though there are other muscles in the body to feature two bellies.

== Anatomy ==
The digastric muscle consists of two muscular bellies united by an intermediate tendon with the posterior belly longer than the anterior belly. The two bellies of the digastric muscle have different embryological origins - the anterior belly is derived from the first brachial arch and the posterior belly from the second brachial arch and thus differ in their innervation.

=== Structure ===
==== Posterior belly ====
The posterior belly attaches at the mastoid notch of the temporal bone (which is located upon the inferior surface of the skull, medial to the mastoid process of the temporal bone - between the mastoid process and the styloid process of the temporal bone).

It extends antero-inferiorly from its osseous attachment toward the intermediate tendon.

==== Anterior belly ====
The anterior belly attaches at the digastric fossa of mandible (situated at the base of the mandible near the midline).

It extends postero-inferiorly from its origin toward the intermediate tendon.

==== Intermediate tendon ====
The two bellies meet at the intermediate tendon which perforates the stylohyoideus muscle. The tendon is embraced by a fibrous sling which attaches the body and greater cornu of hyoid bone. The tendon occasionally features a synovial sheath.

=== Innervation ===
The anterior belly receives motor innervation from the mylohyoid nerve (a branch of the inferior alveolar nerve, which is in turn a branch of the mandibular division of the trigeminal nerve (CN V_{3})).

The posterior belly is supplied by the digastric branch of facial nerve.

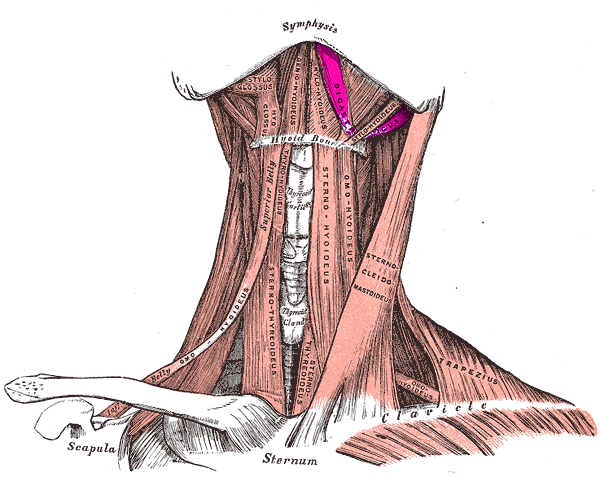
Anterior view of digastric muscle

=== Relations ===
The posterior belly is situated posterior to the parotid gland while the anterior belly is closer to the sub-mandibular salivary gland which is a content of the digastric triangle.

==== Triangles of the neck ====
The digastric muscle divides the anterior triangle of the neck into four smaller triangles: the submandibular triangle (digastric triangle), the carotid triangle, the submental triangle (suprahyoid triangle), and the inferior carotid triangle (muscular triangle).

=== Variation ===
The intermediate tendon may be absent. The posterior belly may arise partly (by a supplemental strip of muscle) or entirely from the styloid process of the temporal bone. It may be connected by a muscle slip to the middle or inferior constrictor.

The anterior belly may be double, or extra slips from this belly may pass to the jaw or mylohyoideus or decussate with a similar slip on opposite side. It may be absent and posterior belly inserted into the middle of the jaw or hyoid bone. It may fuse with the mylohyoid muscle.

The tendon may pass in front, more rarely behind the stylohyoideus. The mentohyoideus muscle passes from the body of hyoid bone to chin.

=== Actions/movements ===
The muscle depresses the mandible, and may elevate the hyoid bone.

It depresses the mandible when the hyoid bone is held in place (by the infrahyoid muscles).

== Function ==
The digastric muscle is involved in any complex jaw action such as speaking, swallowing, chewing, and breathing. The posterior belly is particularly functionally involved in swallowing and chewing.

== Other animals ==
The digastric muscles are present in a variety of animals, specific attachment sites may vary. For example, in the orangutan, the posterior digastric attaches to the mandible rather than the hyoid.
