= Lateral parts of occipital bone =

Parts of bone in base of skull

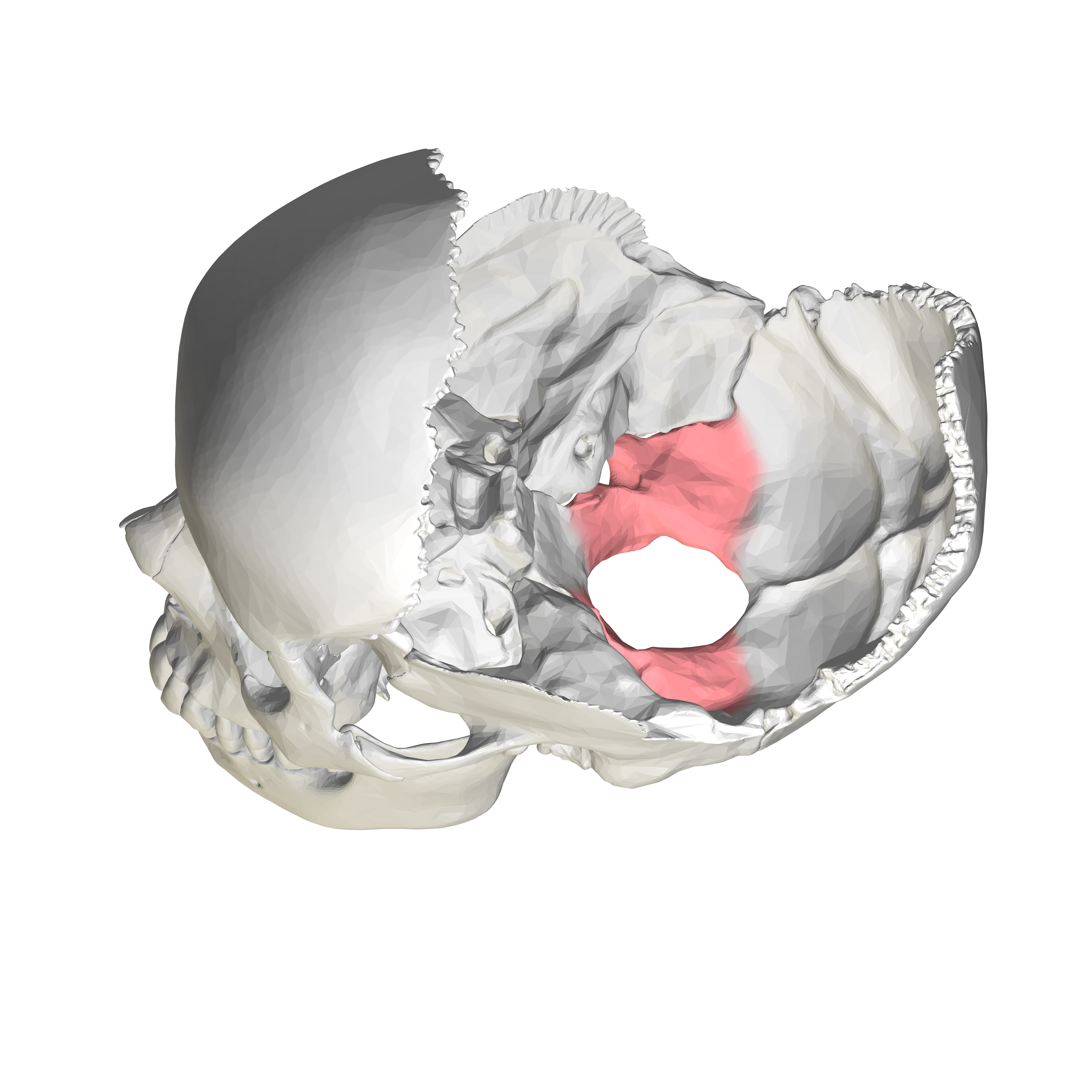
- Human skull seen from above (parietal bones removed.) Lateral parts of occipital bone shown in red.

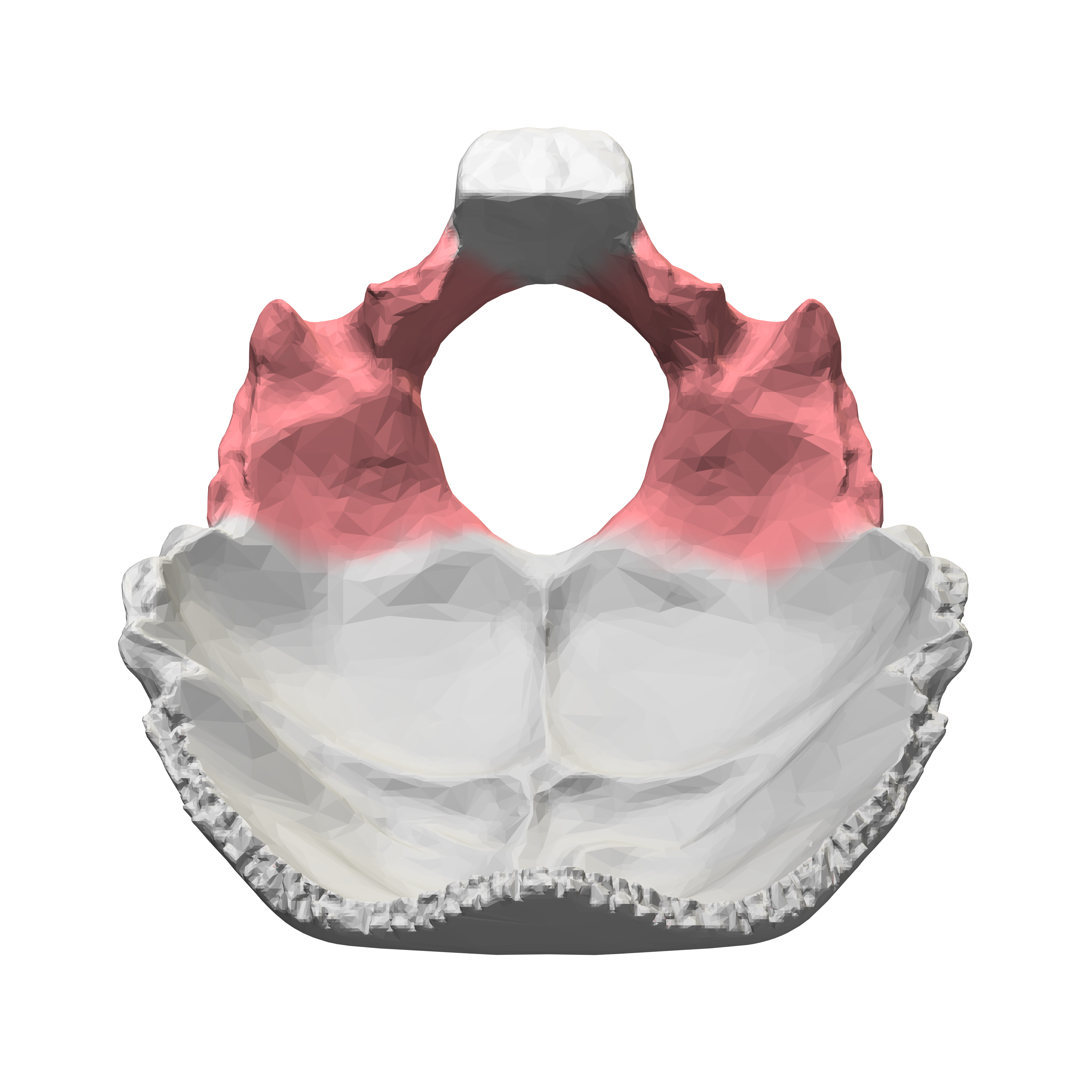
- Occipital bone, inner surface. Lateral parts shown in red.

Details

Identifiers
- Latin: pars lateralis ossis occipitalis
- TA98: A02.1.04.009
- TA2: 556
- FMA: 52859

The lateral parts of the occipital bone are situated at the sides of the foramen magnum; on their under surfaces are the condyles for articulation with the superior facets of the atlas. In some animals, they form separate bones, the exoccipitals.

== Description ==
The condyles are oval or reniform (kidney-shaped) in shape, and their anterior extremities, directed forward and medialward, are closer together than their posterior, and encroach on the basilar portion of the bone; the posterior extremities extend back to the level of the middle of the foramen magnum.

The articular surfaces of the condyles are convex from before backward and from side to side, and look downward and lateralward.

To their margins are attached the capsules of the atlantoöccipital articulations, and on the medial side of each is a rough impression or tubercle for the alar ligament.

At the base of either condyle the bone is tunnelled by a short canal, the hypoglossal canal (anterior condyloid foramen).

This begins on the cranial surface of the bone immediately above the foramen magnum, and is directed lateralward and forward above the condyle.

It may be partially or completely divided into two by a spicule of bone; it gives exit to the hypoglossal or twelfth cerebral nerve, and entrance to a meningeal branch of the ascending pharyngeal artery.

Behind either condyle is a depression, the condyloid fossa, which receives the posterior margin of the superior facet of the atlas when the head is bent backward; the floor of this fossa is sometimes perforated by the condyloid canal, through which an emissary vein passes from the transverse sinus.

Extending lateralward from the posterior half of the condyle is a quadrilateral plate of bone, the jugular process, excavated in front by the jugular notch, which, in the articulated skull, forms the posterior part of the jugular foramen.

The jugular notch may be divided into two by a bony spicule, the intrajugular process, which projects lateralward above the hypoglossal canal.

The under surface of the jugular process is rough, and gives attachment to the Rectus capitis lateralis muscle and the lateral atlanto-occipital ligament; from this surface an eminence, the paramastoid process, sometimes projects downward, and may be of sufficient length to reach, and articulate with, the transverse process of the atlas.

Laterally the jugular process presents a rough quadrilateral or triangular area which is joined to the jugular surface of the temporal bone by a plate of cartilage; after the age of twenty-five this plate tends to ossify.

The upper surface of the lateral part presents an oval eminence, the jugular tubercle, which overlies the hypoglossal canal and is sometimes crossed by an oblique groove for the glossopharyngeal, vagus, and accessory nerves.

On the upper surface of the jugular process is a deep groove which curves medialward and forward and is continuous with the jugular notch.

This groove lodges the terminal part of the transverse sinus, and opening into it, close to its medial margin, is the orifice of the condyloid canal.

== Additional images ==
Human cranium seen from below. Lateral parts of occipital bone shown in red.

Occipital bone. Lateral parts shown in red.

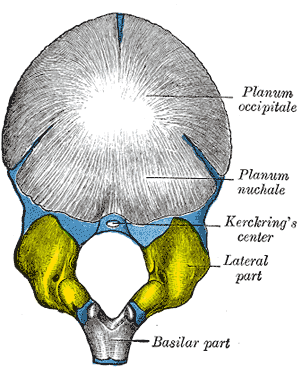
Occipital bone at birth, outer surface. (Lateral parts shown in yellow.)

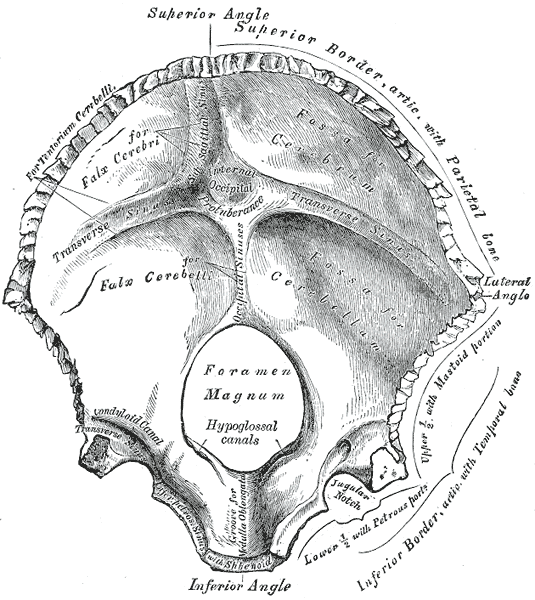
Occipital bone, inner surface
