= Jugular (disambiguation) =

Jugular may refer to:

- The Jugular vein
  - Jugular venous pressure
  - Internal jugular vein
- Jugular foramen
  - Jugular foramen syndrome
- Jugular process
- Jugular tubercle

== See also ==
- Whatever Happened to Jugula?, a 1985 album by Roy Harper
