= Venous plexus of hypoglossal canal =

Details

Identifiers
- Latin: plexus venosus canalis nervi hypoglossi, (Note: (TA) denotes this is the official international terminology as listed in the Terminologia Anatomica.) circellus venosus hypoglossi, rete canalis hypoglossi
- TA98: A12.3.05.306
- TA2: 4877
- FMA: 50795

The venous plexus of hypoglossal canal is a small venous plexus surrounding the hypoglossal nerve (cranial nerve XII) as it passes through the hypoglossal canal. The plexus connects with the occipital sinus (intercranially), inferior petrosal sinus (intercranially), internal jugular vein (extracranially), condylar vein, and paravertebral venous plexus.

== Anatomy ==
Anatomical studies have demonstrated that the venous plexus is the dominant structure of the hypoglossal canal. Research has shown that the size of the hypoglossal canal varies in relation to an individual's skull size, suggesting that the venous plexus functions as an essential emissary veinous structure.

=== Variation ===
Occasionally, it may be a single vein rather than a venous plexus.

== Clinical significance ==
A case report described an instance of a dilated venous plexus of hypoglossal canal portruding into the cerebellomedullary cistern and thus mimicking a pathological mass upon MRI imaging.
