= Condyloid fossa =

Depression in the occipital bone

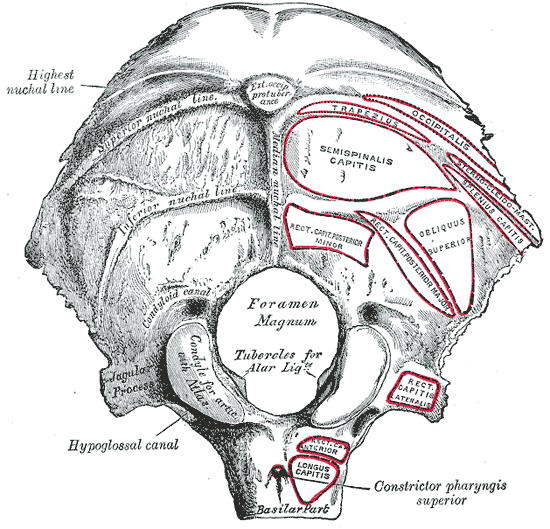
- Occipital bone. Outer surface. (Condyloid fossa visible but not labeled.)

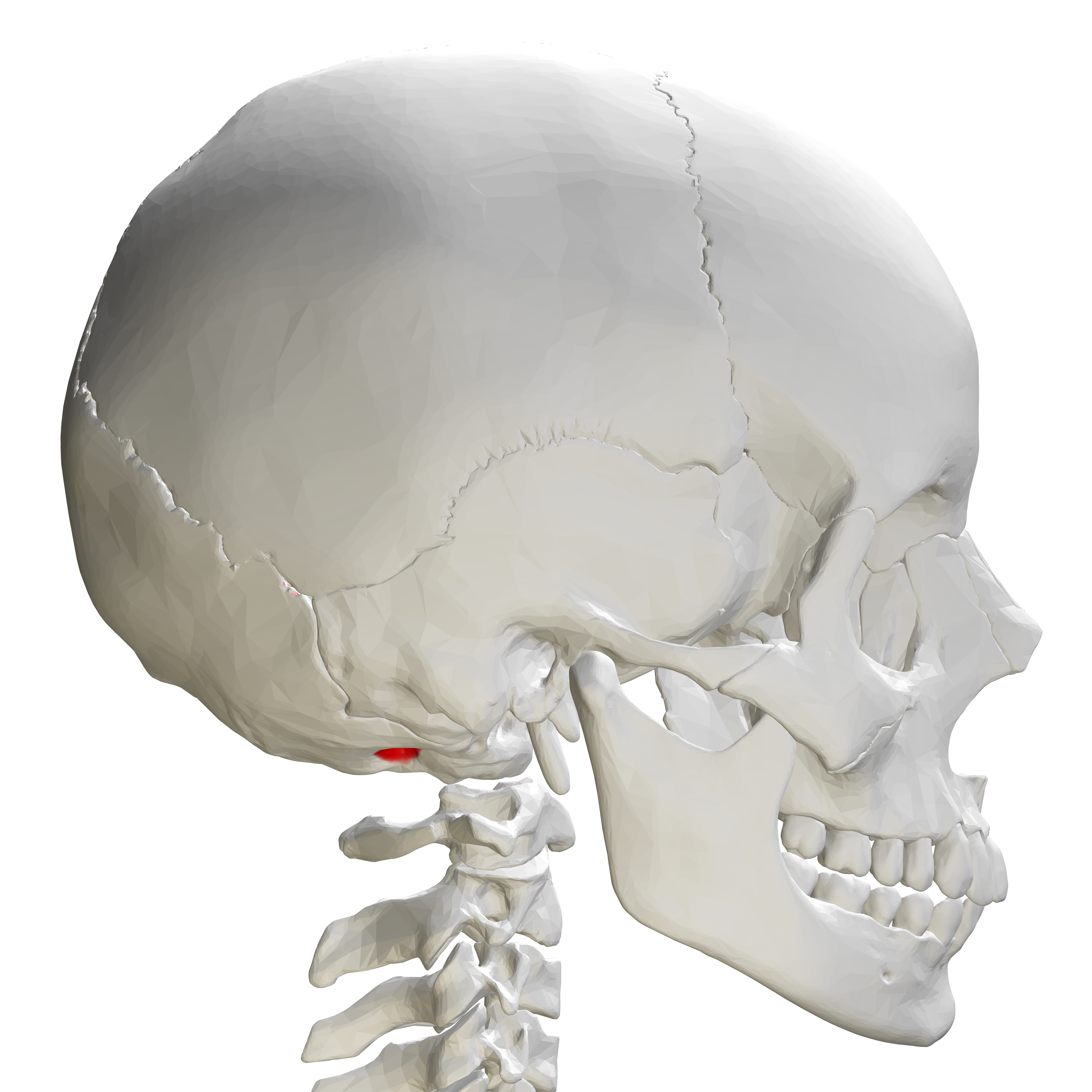
- Skull and cervical vertebra. Position of condyloid fossa shown in red.

Details

Identifiers
- Latin: fossa condylaris
- TA98: A02.1.04.017
- TA2: 560
- FMA: 75310

Behind either condyle of the lateral parts of occipital bone is a depression, the condyloid fossa (or condylar fossa), which receives the posterior margin of the superior facet of the atlas when the head is bent backward; the floor of this fossa is sometimes perforated by the condyloid canal, through which an emissary vein passes from the transverse sinus.

== Additional images ==
Human skull seen from below. Position of condyloid fossa shown in red.

Skull and cervical vertebra. Position of condyloid fossa shown in red.

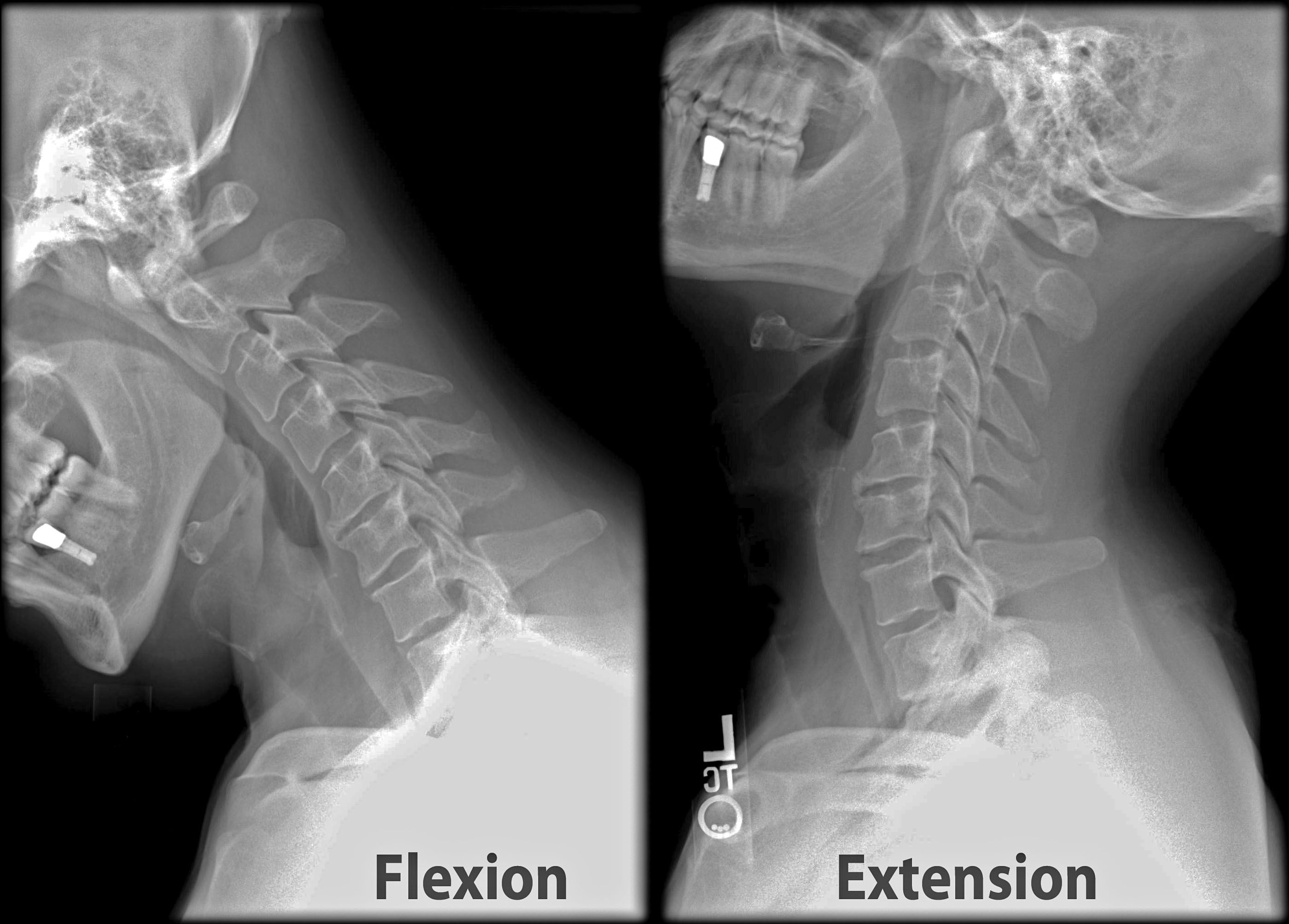
X-ray of cervical spine (neck) in flexion and extension (bending backwards)

== See also ==
- Occipital condyle
- Atlas
