= Occipital emissary vein =

Details
- Drains to: occipital vein

Identifiers
- Latin: vena emissaria occipitalis
- TA98: A12.3.05.305
- TA2: 4876
- FMA: 50794

The occipital emissary vein is a small emissary vein which passes through the condylar canal.
