= Condylar canal =

Canal in the condyloid fossa of the occipital bone

Condyloid canal
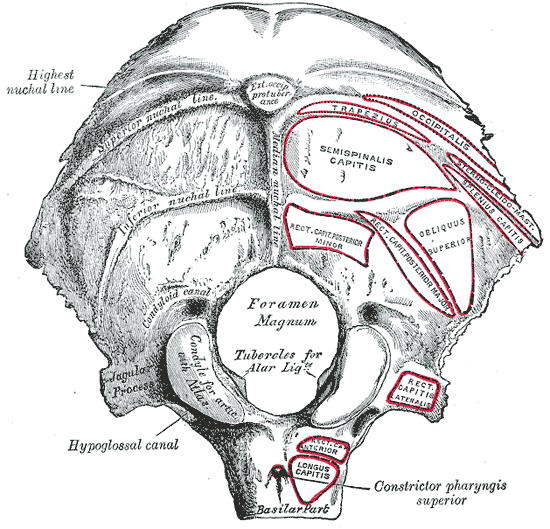
- Occipital bone. Outer surface. (Condyloid canal visible at center left.)

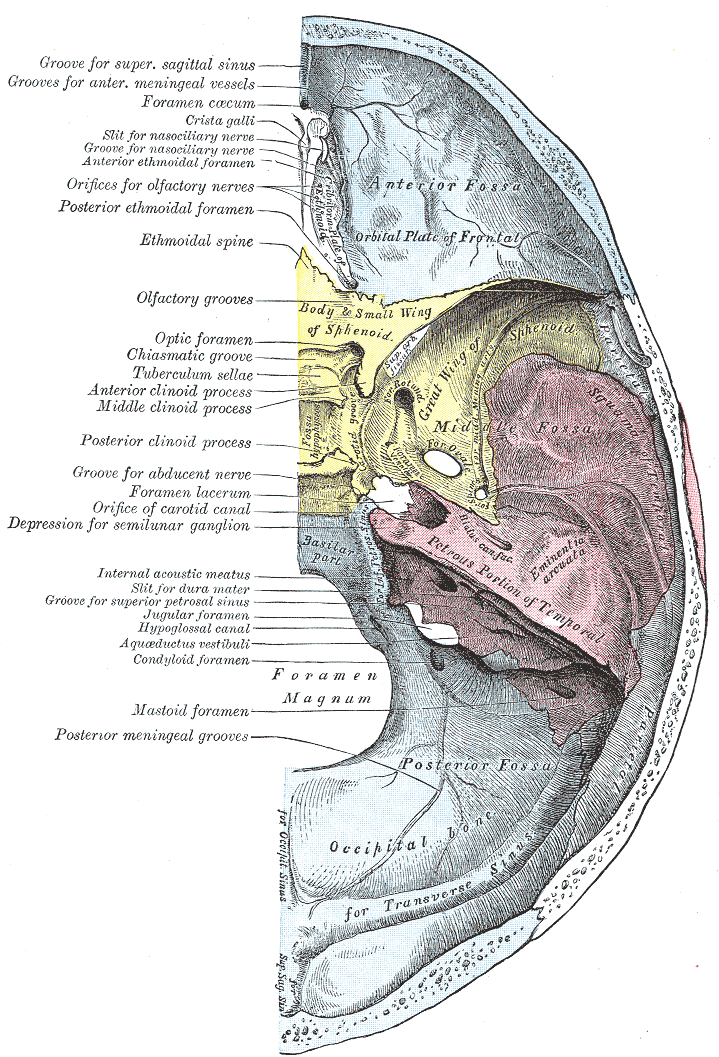
- Base of the skull. Upper surface. (Condyloid canal not labeled, the occipital bone is visible at the bottom in blue, and the condyloid foramen is labeled at left, third from the bottom.)

Details

Identifiers
- Latin: canalis condylaris
- TA98: A02.1.04.015
- TA2: 558
- FMA: 75369

The condylar canal (or condyloid canal) is a canal in the condyloid fossa of the lateral parts of occipital bone behind the occipital condyle. Resection of the rectus capitis posterior major and minor muscles reveals the bony recess leading to the condylar canal, which is situated posterior and lateral to the occipital condyle. It is immediately superior to the extradural vertebral artery, which makes a loop above the posterior C1 ring to enter the foramen magnum. The anteriomedial wall of the condylar canal thickens to join the foramen magnum rim and connect to the occipital condyle.

Through the condylar canal, the occipital emissary vein connects to the venous system including the suboccipital venous plexus, occipital sinus and sigmoid sinus.

It is not always present, and can have variations of being a single canal or multiple smaller canals in cluster.

== Additional images ==
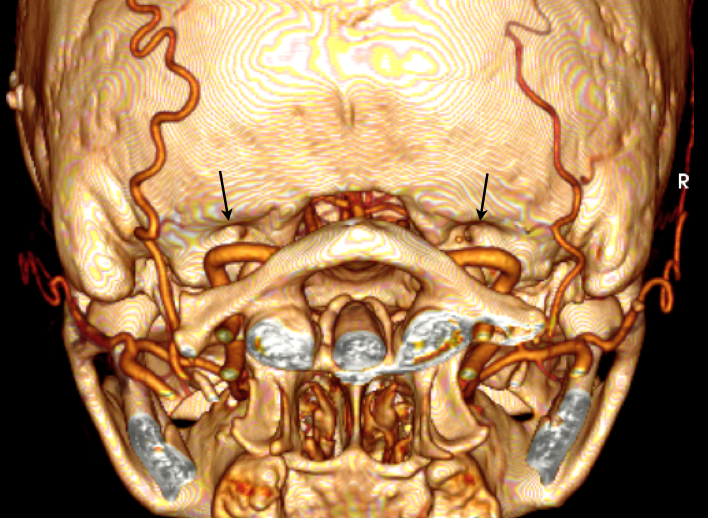
Bilateral condylar canals (arrows) above the vertebral arteries

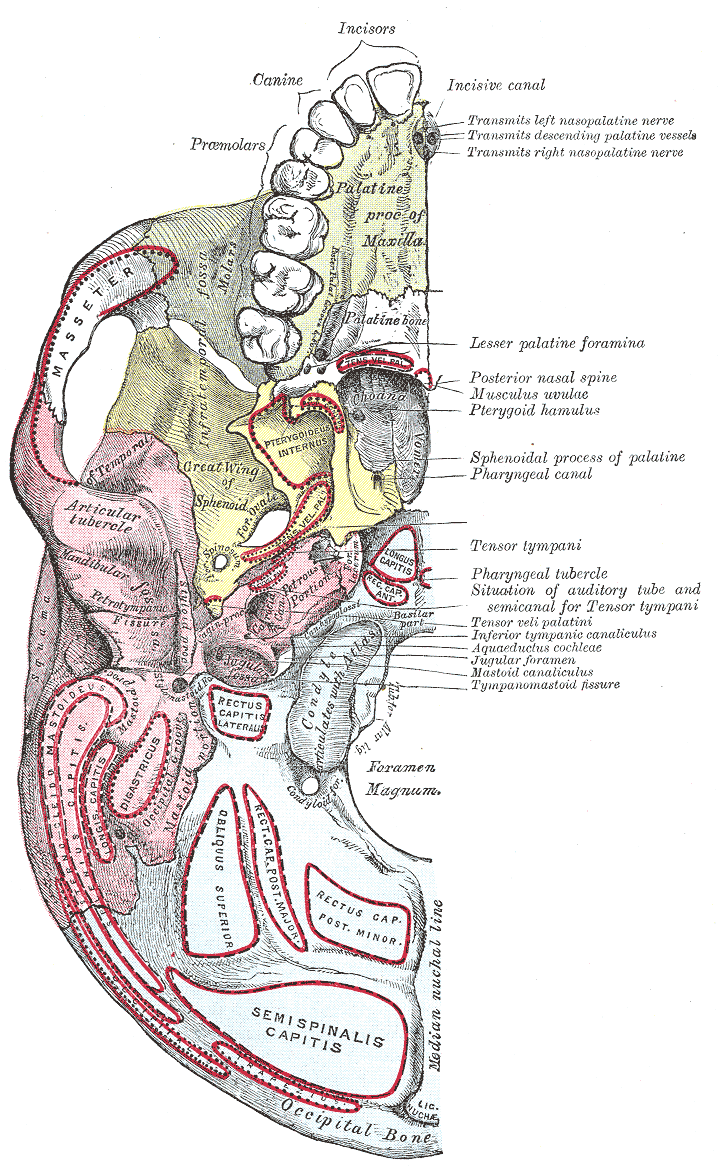
Base of skull. Inferior surface.
