= Condylar decompression =

The objective of condylar decompression, also called jugular decompression and occipital release, is to balance the reciprocal tension membrane at the hypoglossal canal, thus normalizing the function of cranial nerve XII (hypoglossal nerve).

The procedure is indicated by a poor suckling reflex of an infant attributed to somatic dysfunction of the occiput on CNXII. The procedure consists of applying a gentle force to release the tissues.
