= Counterstrain =

Counterstrain is a technique used in osteopathic medicine, osteopathy, physical therapy, massage therapy, and chiropractic to treat somatic dysfunction. It is a system of diagnosis and treatment that uses tender points, which are produced by trauma, inflammation, postural strain, or disease, to identify structures to manipulate. The manipulation uses light pressure to decompress the local nociceptors and mechanoreceptors responsible for the sensation of pain, returning central sensitization to its normal state. This technique extends Strain Counterstrain, a technique that inhibits the reflexes by putting the tissues in a position of ease directly opposite to that of the reflex. Counterstrain was developed by the osteopathic physician Lawrence Jones DO in 1955 (and is therefore also known as the Jones technique). It was originally called “Spontaneous Release by Positioning” before being termed “strain-counterstrain.”

== Strain-Counterstrain ==
In this technique the practitioner identifies a point of musculoskeletal pain called a tender point. Tender points are small, discrete, edematous areas on the body that elicit pain when palpated. Monitoring the tender point, the practitioner positions the patient such that the tenderness at the counterstrain point is minimized when pressed. The practitioner holds the patient in a maximally relaxed position for 90 seconds and then slowly returns the passive patient to a neutral body position. Success of treatment is evaluated by reassessing both the tender point and any accompanying change in range of motion.

Over 200 tender point locations have been identified to correspond to strain in different muscles and joints. The technique has developed to include variations of methods to identify tender points and manipulations.

== Conceptual basis ==
The idea behind counterstrain states that tender points result from reflexive muscular spasm that correspond to dysfunctional motor segments, due to the compensation of an antagonist muscle responding to agonist muscle over-lengthening.

== See also ==
- Condylar decompression

== Sources ==
- Ward, Robert C. et al.; Foundations for Osteopathic Medicine (2nd ed.). Philadelphia: Lippincott Williams & Wilkins. ISBN 0-7817-3497-5.
