= Intrajugular process of occipital bone =

Anatomical bone structure

Details
- Part of: Occipital bone

Identifiers
- Latin: Processus intrajugularis ossis occipitalis
- TA98: A02.1.04.021
- TA2: 564
- FMA: 75751

Intrajugular process of occipital bone (Processus intrajugularis ossis occipitalis) is a small, pointed process extending from the middle of the jugular notch of occipital bone, that subdivides the jugular notch of the occipital bone into a lateral and a medial part.
