= Jugular tubercle =

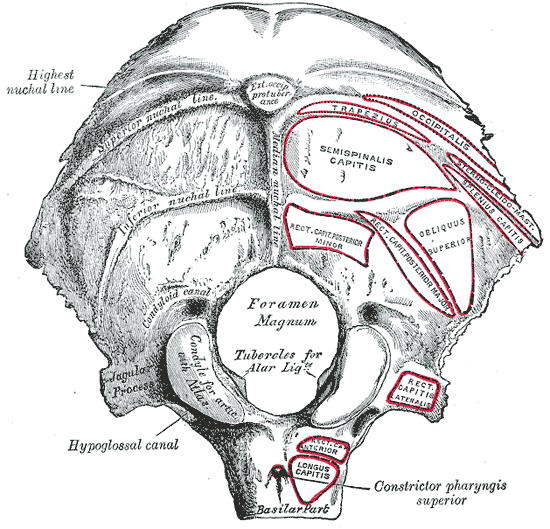
- Occipital bone. Outer surface. (Jugular tubercle not visible, but hypoglossal canal is visible at lower left.)

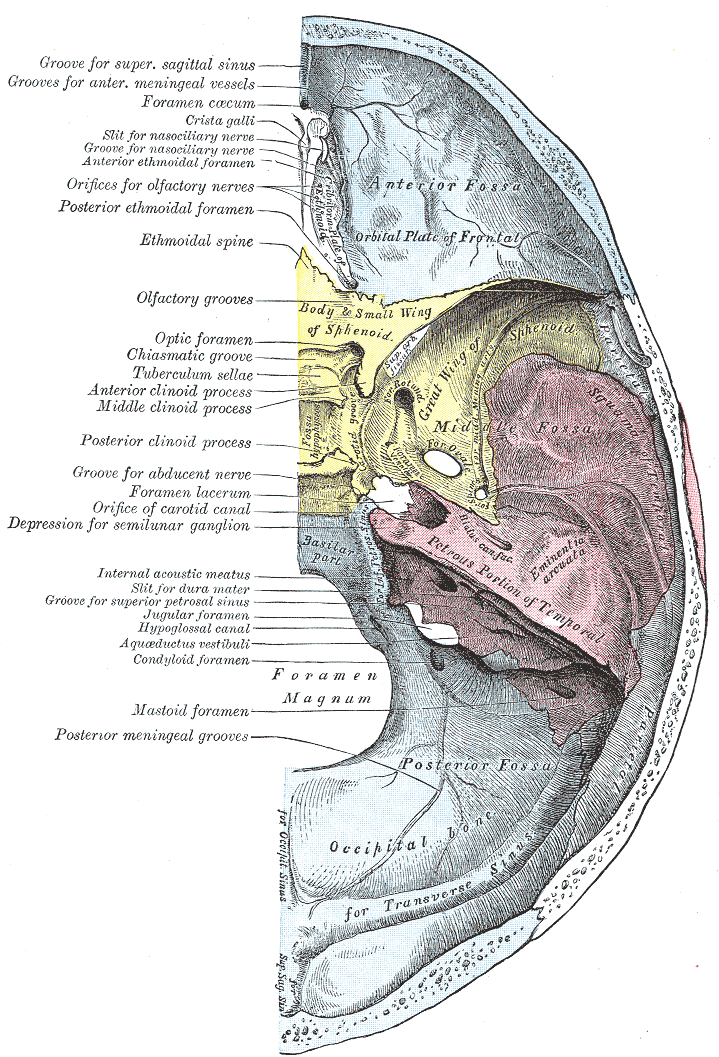
- Base of the skull. Upper surface. (Jugular tubercle not visible, but occipital bone is identified at bottom in blue, and jugular tubercle is to right of foramen magnum.)

Details

Identifiers
- Latin: tuberculum jugulare ossis occipitalis
- TA98: A02.1.04.018
- TA2: 561
- FMA: 75749

The jugular tubercle (of occipital bone) is a rounded prominence/oval elevation upon the superior (i.e. internal) surface of the occipital condyle at the junction of the basilar part and lateral part of the occipital bone, just medial to the jugular foramen on either side of the foramen magnum.

It overlies (i.e. is situated superior to) the hypoglossal canal and is situated anterosuperior to the internal opening of this canal. The glossopharyngeal nerve (CN IX), vagus (CN X), and accessory (CN XI) pass across the posterior portion of the jugular tubercle to reach the jugular foramen.
