= Occipital vein =

Vein of the scalp

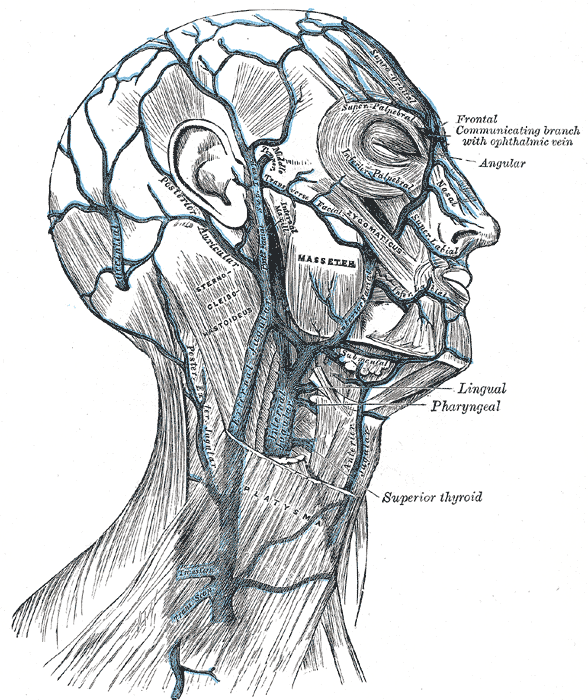
- Veins of the head and neck. (Occipial visible at left.)

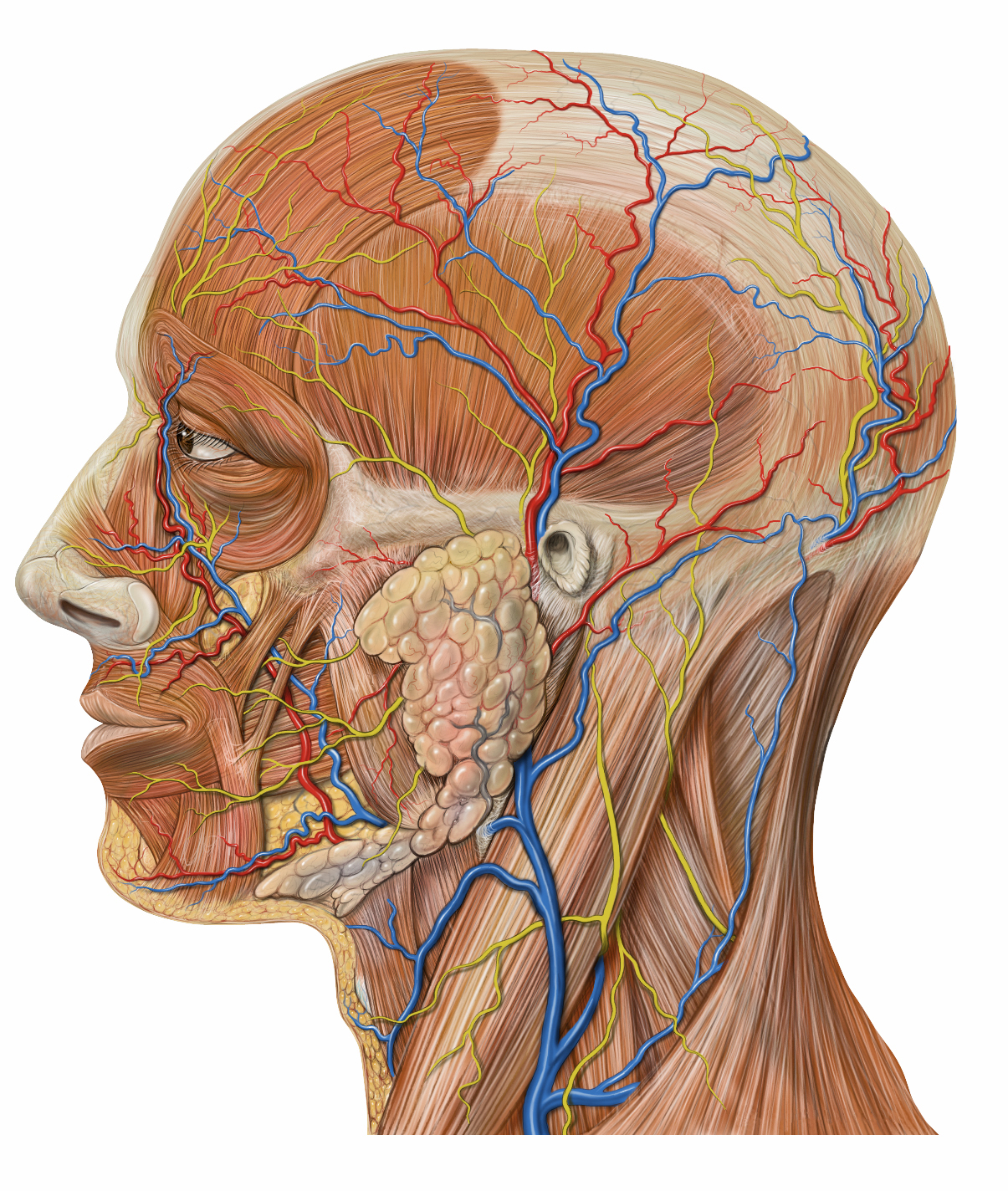
- Lateral head anatomy detail

Details
- Drains from: Scalp, occiput
- Drains to: Suboccipital venous plexus
- Artery: Occipital artery

Identifiers
- Latin: vena occipitalis
- TA98: A12.3.04.013
- TA2: 4781
- FMA: 50802

The occipital vein is a vein of the scalp. It originates from a plexus around the external occipital protuberance and superior nuchal line to the back part of the vertex of the skull. It usually drains into the internal jugular vein, but may also drain into the posterior auricular vein (which joins the external jugular vein). It drains part of the scalp.

== Structure ==
The occipital vein is part of the scalp. It begins as a plexus at the posterior aspect of the scalp from the external occipital protuberance and superior nuchal line to the back part of the vertex of the skull. It pierces the cranial attachment of the trapezius and, dipping into the venous plexus of the suboccipital triangle, joins the deep cervical vein and the vertebral vein. Occasionally it follows the course of the occipital artery, and ends in the internal jugular vein. Alternatively, it joins the posterior auricular vein, and ends in the external jugular vein.

The parietal emissary vein connects it with the superior sagittal sinus. As the occipital vein passes across the mastoid portion of the temporal bone, it usually receives the mastoid emissary vein, which connects it with the sigmoid sinus. The occipital diploic vein sometimes joins it.

== Function ==
The occipital vein drains blood from part of the scalp.

== Additional images ==
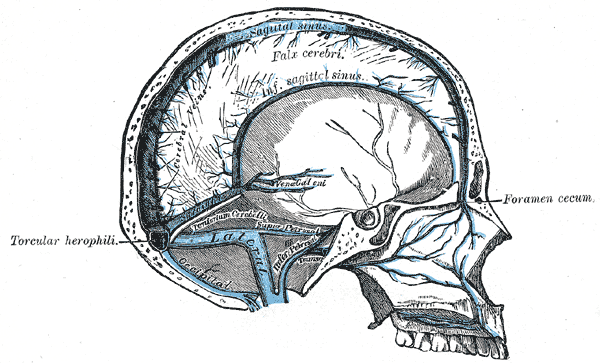
Sagittal section of the skull, showing the sinuses of the dura.
