= Suprahyoid muscles =

Group of muscles in the neck

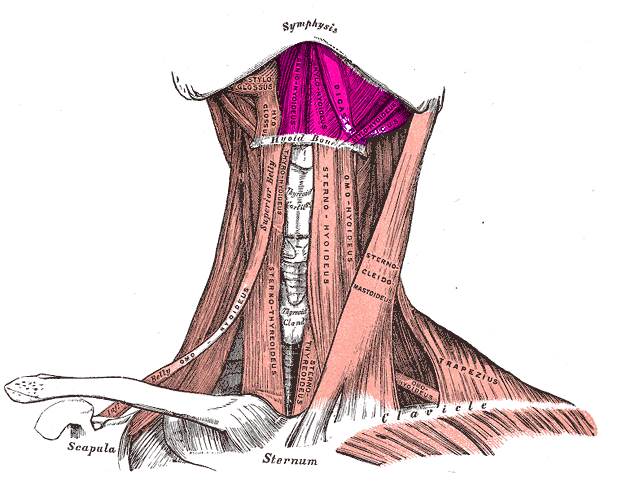
- Muscles of the neck. Anterior view. Hyoid bone is white horizontal line near top. Infrahyoid muscles are below hyoid, while Suprahyoid muscles are labeled above.

Details

Identifiers
- Latin: musculi suprahyoidei
- TA98: A04.2.03.001
- TA2: 2159
- FMA: 71301

The suprahyoid muscles are four muscles located above the hyoid bone in the neck. They are the digastric, stylohyoid, geniohyoid, and mylohyoid muscles. They are all pharyngeal muscles, with the exception of the geniohyoid muscle. The digastric is uniquely named for its two bellies. Its posterior belly rises from the mastoid process of the cranium and slopes downward and forward. The anterior belly arises from the digastric fossa on the inner surface of the mandibular body, which slopes downward and backward. The two bellies connect at the intermediate tendon. The intermediate tendon passes through a connective tissue loop attached to the hyoid bone. The mylohyoid muscles are thin, flat muscles that form a sling inferior to the tongue supporting the floor of the mouth. The geniohyoids are short, narrow muscles that contact each other in the midline. The stylohyoids are long, thin muscles that are nearly parallel with the posterior belly of the digastric muscle.

== Function ==
These four muscles have different actions, but in general assist in elevating the hyoid bone and widening the esophagus during swallowing. When the two bellies of the digastric contract, they pull upward on the hyoid bone; but if the hyoid is fixed from below, the digastric assists in extreme opening of the mouth such as yawning or taking a large bite of an apple. The mylohyoid elevates the hyoid bone, tenses the floor of the mouth. The geniohyoid pulls the hyoid bone anterosuperiorly, shortening the floor of the mouth and widening the pharynx during swallowing. The stylohyoid elevates and retracts the hyoid bone, elongating the floor of the mouth during swallowing.

Muscle	Origin	Insertion	Innervation
Digastric (anterior belly)	Digastric fossa of Mandible	Intermediate Tendon	Mylohyoid nerve - branch of CN V3 (Mandibular division of Trigeminal nerve)
Digastric (posterior belly)	Mastoid notch	Intermediate Tendon	Facial nerve (CN VII)
Geniohyoid	Inferior mental spine of symphysis menti	Hyoid	Cervical spinal nerve 1 via the hypoglossal nerve (CN XII)
Stylohyoid	Temporal styloid process	Hyoid	Facial nerve (CN VII)
Mylohyoid	Mylohyoid line of mandible	Hyoid	Mylohyoid nerve - branch of CN V3 (Mandibular division of Trigeminal nerve - CN V)

== See also ==
- Infrahyoid muscles
