= Posterior meningeal artery =

Meningeal branch of the ascending pharyngeal artery

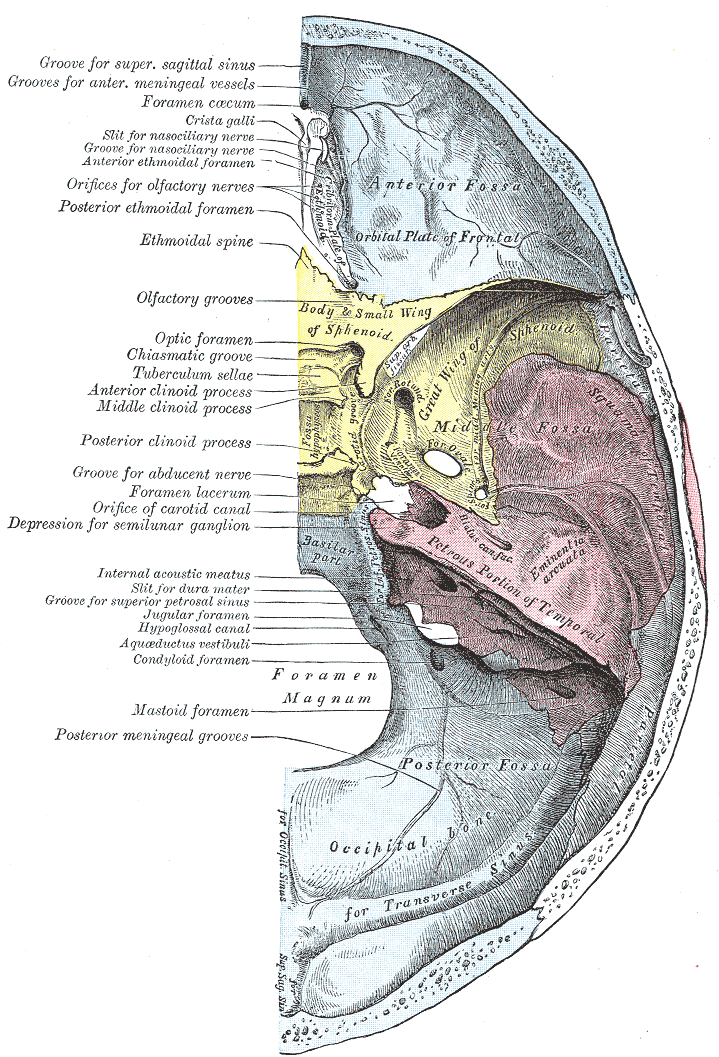
- Posterior meningeal groove labeled at bottom left.

Details
- Source: Ascending pharyngeal artery

Identifiers
- Latin: arteria meningea posterior
- TA98: A12.2.05.011
- TA2: 4379
- FMA: 49503

The posterior meningeal artery is one of the meningeal branches of the ascending pharyngeal artery (and is typically considered the terminal branch of said artery). It passes through the jugular foramen to enter the posterior cranial fossa. It is the largest vessel supplying the dura of the posterior cranial fossa.

It may occasionally arise from other arteries (e.g. the occipital artery).

It forms anastomoses with the branches of the middle meningeal artery, and the vertebral artery.
