= Pharyngeal artery =

Blood vessel

The pharyngeal artery is a branch of the ascending pharyngeal artery. The pharyngeal artery passes inferior-ward in between the superior margin of the superior pharyngeal constrictor muscle, and the levator veli palatini muscle. It issues branches to the constrictor muscles of the pharynx, the stylopharyngeus muscle, the pharyngotympanic tube, and palatine tonsil; a palatine branch may sometimes be present, replacing the ascending palatine branch of facial artery.
