= Mental spine =

Bony projection on the posterior aspect of the mandible

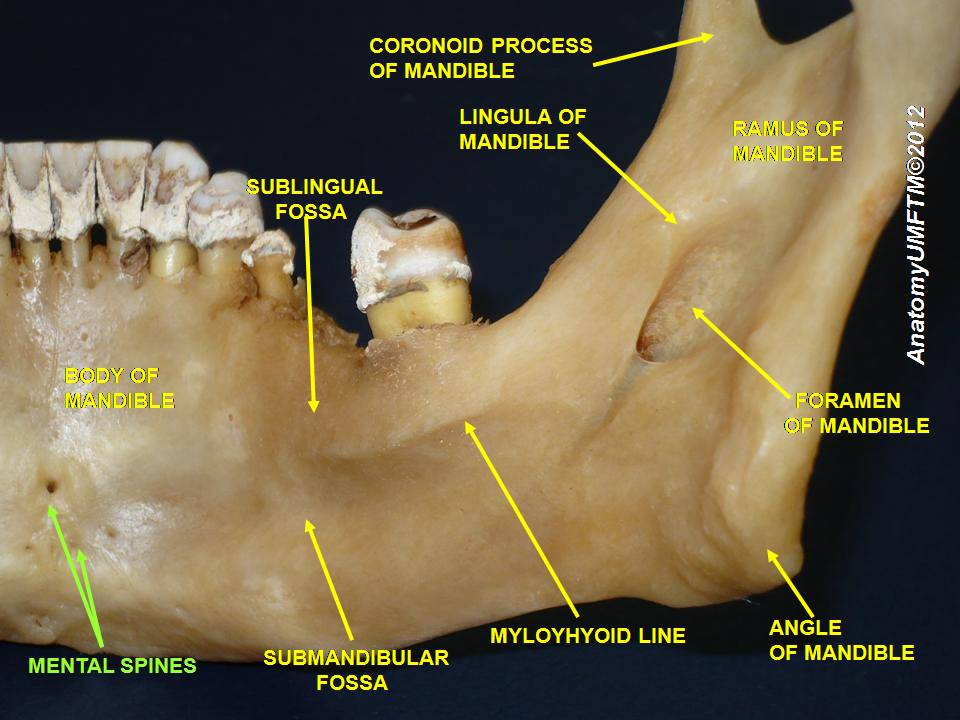
- The posterior aspect of the mandible, showing mental spines.

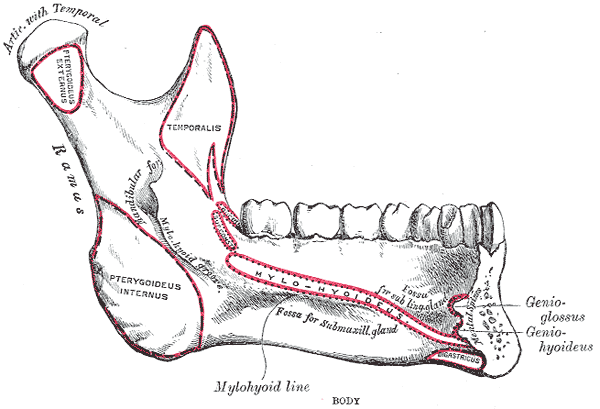
- A medial view of the mandible showing the attachments of geniohyoid and genioglossus.

Details
- Part of: Mandible
- System: Skeletal

Identifiers
- Latin: spinae mentalis

A mental spine is a small projection of bone on the posterior aspect of the mandible in the midline. There are usually four mental spines: two superior and two inferior. Collectively they are also known as the genial tubercle, genial apophysis and the Latin name spinae mentalis. The inferior mental spines are the points of origin of the geniohyoid muscle, one of the suprahyoid muscles, and the superior mental spines are the origin of the genioglossus muscle, one of the muscles of the tongue. Mental spines are important landmarks in clinical practice.

== Structure ==
Mental spines are found on the posterior aspect of the mandible (lower jaw bone) in the midline. They usually surround spinous mental foramina in the midline.

=== Variation ===
Mental spines may be found in over 98% of people. Over 70% of mandibles may only have 2 superior spines, while around 20% may have 4 spines.

== Function ==
The inferior mental spines are the points of origin of the geniohyoid muscle, one of the suprahyoid muscles, and the superior mental spines are the origin of the genioglossus muscle, one of the muscles of the tongue.

== Clinical significance ==
Mental spines are important landmarks for maxillofacial surgeons, dentists, and radiologists.

== Etymology ==
The adjective mental in this instance is used in its "chin-related" sense (from Latin mentum) rather than its more common "mind-related" sense (from Latin mens). Collectively they are also known as the genial tubercle, genial apophysis and the Latin name spinae mentalis.

== Additional images ==
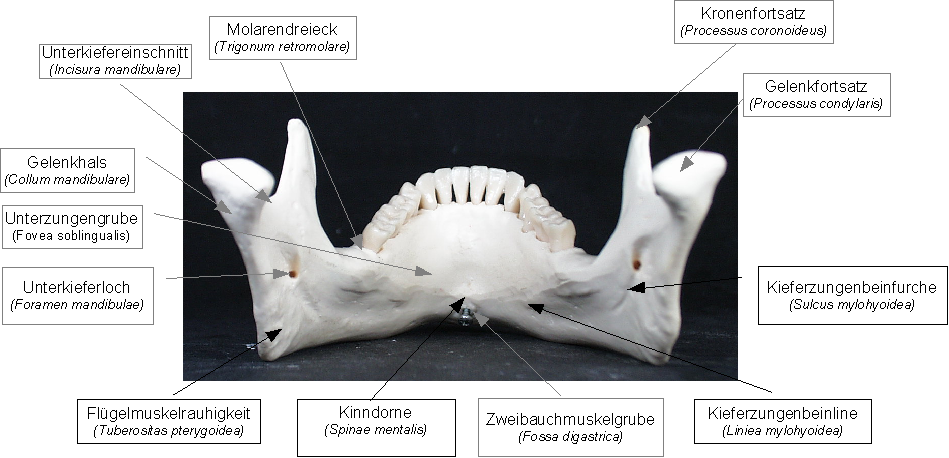
The posterior aspect of the mandible, showing mental spines.
