= Jugular process =

Part of the human skull

- Human skull seen from above. Jugular process shown in red.

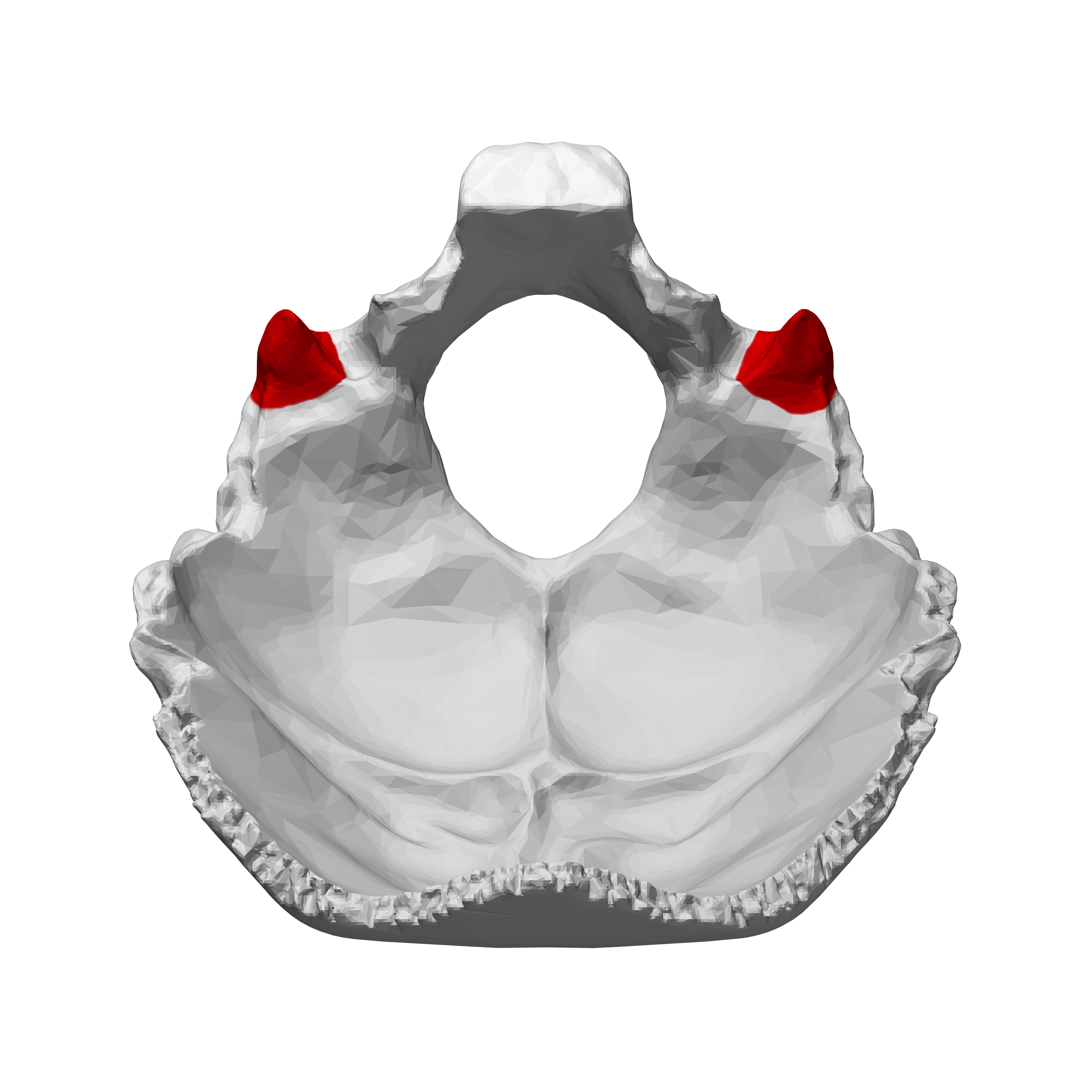
- Occipital bone. Inner surface. Jugular process shown in red.

Details

Identifiers
- Latin: processus jugularis ossis occipitalis
- TA98: A02.1.04.020
- TA2: 563
- FMA: 75750

The jugular process is a quadrilateral or triangular bony plate projecting lateralward from the posterior half of the occipital condyle; it is a part of the lateral part of the occipital bone.

The jugular process is excavated in front by the jugular notch of occipital bone (which forms the posterior part of the jugular foramen). The posterolateral side of the jugular foramen is divided from the anteromedial side by the intrajugular process of occipital bone.

The jugular process serves as the insertion of the rectus capitis lateralis.
