= Geniohyoid muscle =

Muscle of the head

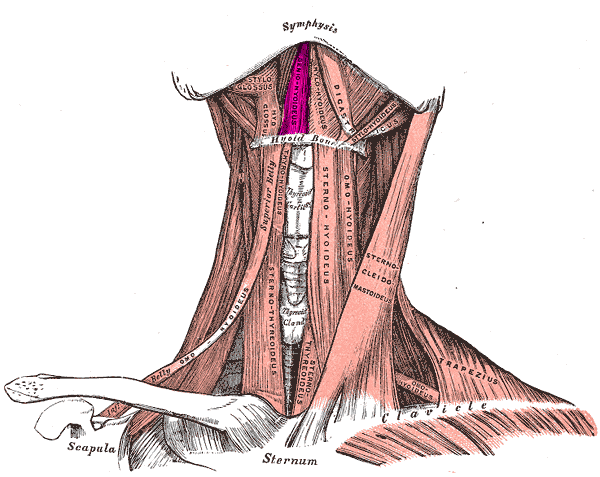
- Anterior view. Geniohyoid muscle labeled at upper center left

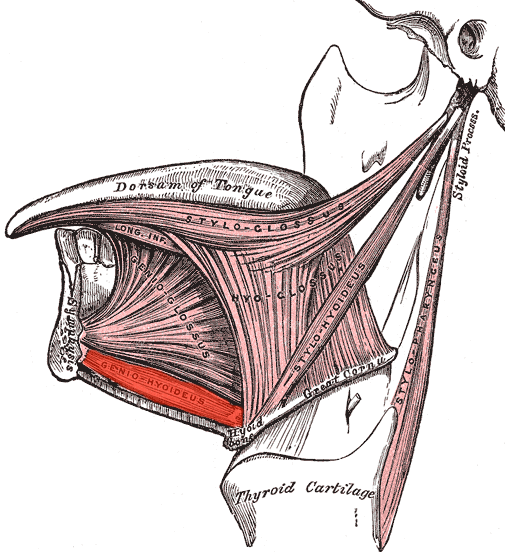
- Extrinsic muscles of the tongue. Left side.

Details
- Origin: Inferior mental spine of mandible
- Insertion: Hyoid bone
- Artery: Branches of the lingual artery.
- Nerve: C1 via the hypoglossal nerve
- Actions: Carry hyoid bone and the tongue upward during deglutition

Identifiers
- Latin: musculus geniohyoideus
- TA98: A04.2.03.007
- TA2: 2166
- FMA: 46325

The geniohyoid muscle is a narrow paired muscle situated superior to the medial border of the mylohyoid muscle. It is named for its passage from the chin ("genio-" is a standard prefix for "chin") to the hyoid bone.

== Structure ==
The geniohyoid is a paired short muscle that arises from the inferior mental spine, on the back of the mandibular symphysis, and runs backward and slightly downward, to be inserted into the anterior surface of the body of the hyoid bone. It lies in contact with its counterpart on the opposite side. It thus belongs to the suprahyoid muscles. The muscle receives its blood supply from branches of the lingual artery.

=== Innervation ===
The geniohyoid muscle is innervated by fibres from the first cervical spinal nerve travelling alongside the hypoglossal nerve. Although the first three cervical nerves give rise to the ansa cervicalis, the geniohyoid muscle is said to be innervated by the first cervical nerve, as some of its efferent fibers do not contribute to ansa cervicalis.

=== Variations ===
It may be blended with the one on opposite side or double; slips to greater cornu of hyoid bone and genioglossus occur.

== Function ==
The geniohyoid muscle brings the hyoid bone forward and upwards. This dilates the upper airway, assisting respiration. During the first act of deglutition, when the mass of food is being driven from the mouth into the pharynx, the hyoid bone, and with it the tongue, is carried upward and forward by the anterior bellies of the Digastrici, the Mylohyoidei, and Geniohyoidei. It also assists in depressing the mandible.

== History ==
The inclined position of the geniohyoid muscle has been contrasted to the horizontal position in neanderthals.

== Additional images ==
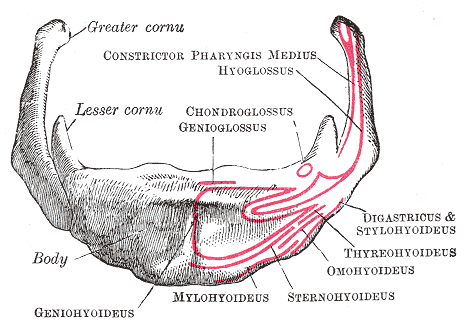
Illustration of the hyoid bone showing the insertion point of the geniohyoid muscle

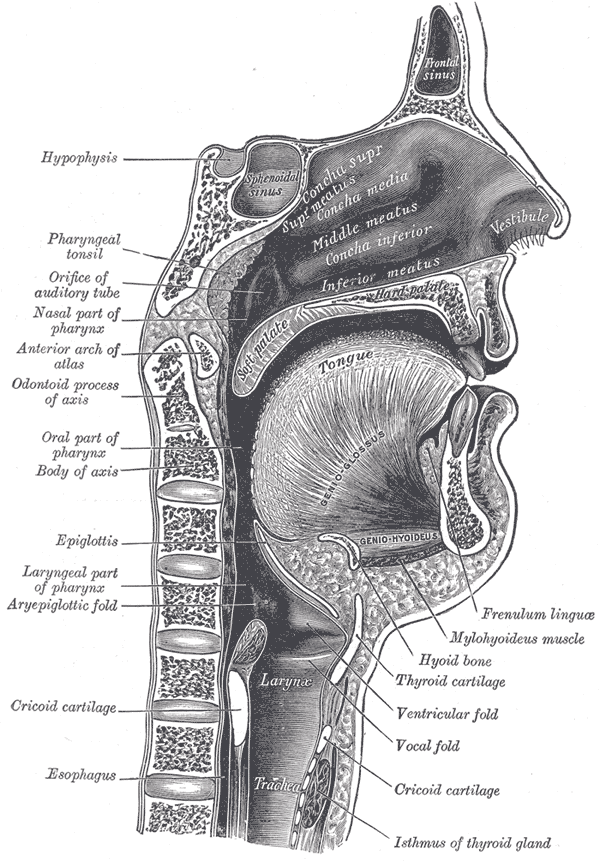
Sagittal section of nose mouth, pharynx, and larynx.

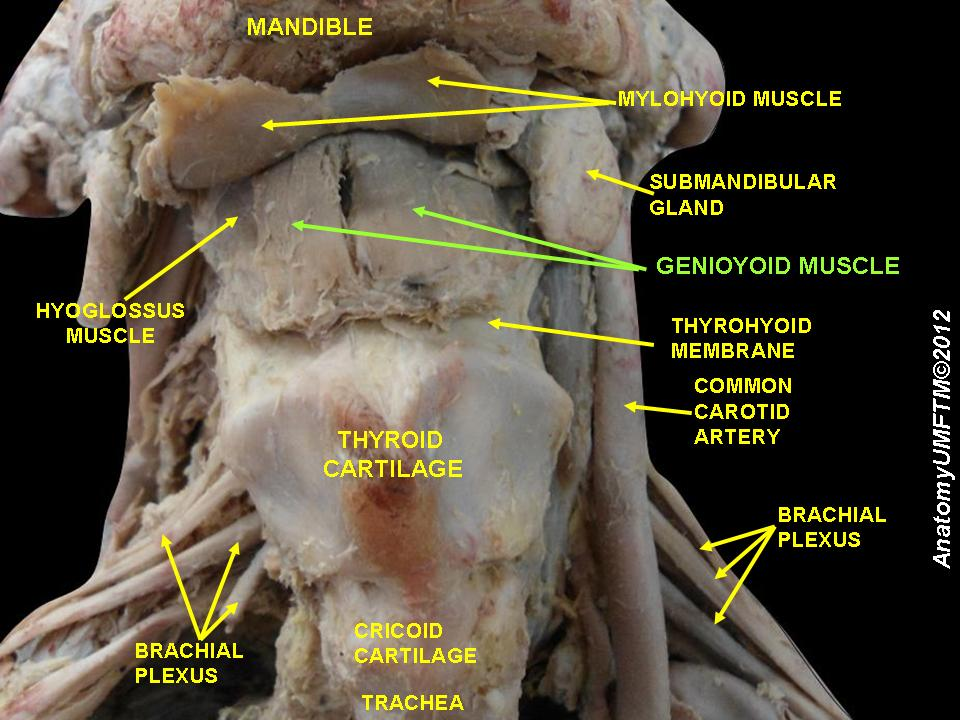
Geniohyoid muscle

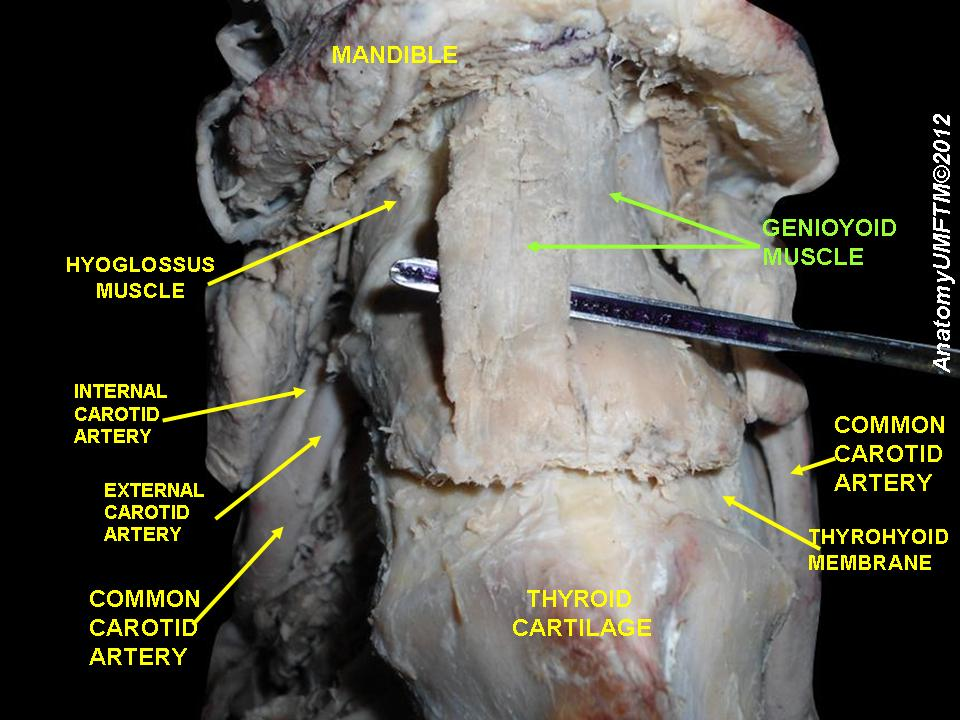
Geniohyoid muscle

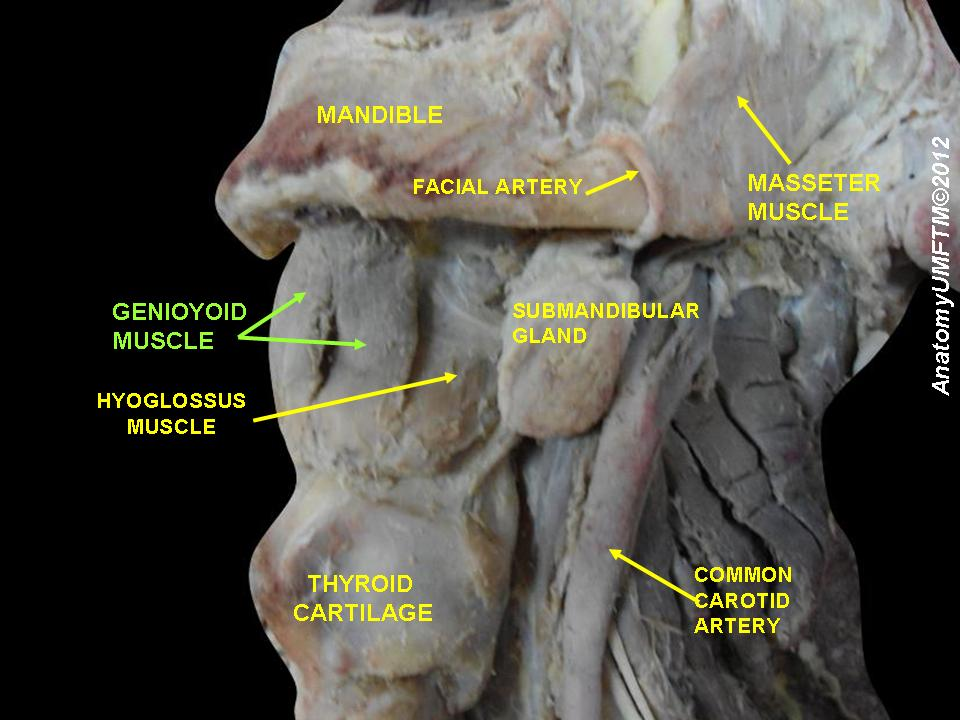
Geniohyoid muscle
