= Jugular foramen syndrome =

- Human brain inferior view showing cranial nerves

Jugular foramen syndrome, or Vernet's syndrome, is characterized by paresis of the glossopharyngeal, vagal, and accessory (with or without the hypoglossal) nerves.

== Symptoms ==
Symptoms of this syndrome are consequences of this paresis. As such, an affected patient may show:

- dysphonia/hoarseness
- soft palate drooping
- deviation of the uvula towards the normal side
- dysphagia
- loss of sensory function from the posterior 1/3 of the tongue (CN IX)
- decrease in the parotid gland secretion (CN IX)
- loss of gag reflex
- sternocleidomastoid and trapezius muscles paresis (CN XI)

== Causes ==
- Glomus tumors (most frequently)
- Meningiomas
- Schwannomas (Acoustic neuroma)
- Metastatic tumors located at the cerebellopontine angle
- Trauma
- Fracture of occipital bone
- Infections
- Cholesteatoma (very rare)
- Obstruction of the jugular foramen due to bone diseases
- Nasopharyngeal carcinoma spreading into the parapharyngeal space involving the ninth, tenth, and eleventh cranial nerves

== Diagnosis ==
- Gadolinium-enhanced MRI for vestibular schwannoma
- MRI and biopsy for nasopharyngeal carcinoma
- Based on nerve palsies
- NCCT for occipital bone fracture
