= Suboccipital venous plexus =

Vein at the back of the head

Details
- Source: occipital vein
- Drains to: vertebral vein

Identifiers
- Latin: plexus venosus suboccipitalis
- TA98: A12.3.04.016
- TA2: 4784
- FMA: 50803

The suboccipital venous plexus drains deoxygenated blood from the back of the head.

It communicates with the external vertebral venous plexuses. The external vertebral venous plexuses travel inferiorly from this suboccipital region to drain into the brachiocephalic vein. The occipital vein joins in the formation of the plexus deep to the musculature of the back and from here drains into the external jugular vein.

The plexus surrounds segments of the vertebral artery.
