= Rectus capitis lateralis muscle =

Muscle of the neck

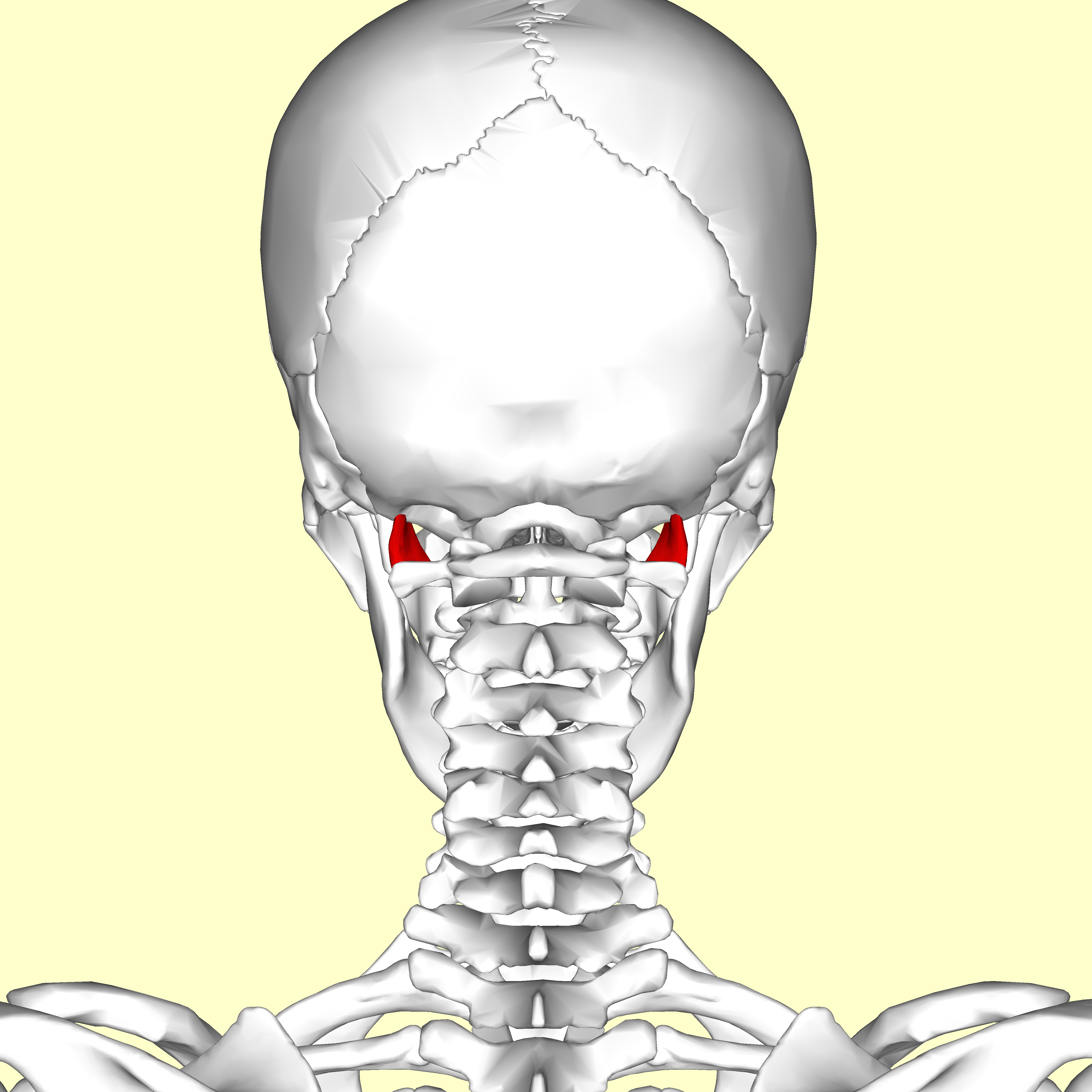
- Posterior view of neck bones (rectus capitis lateralis muscle shown in red)

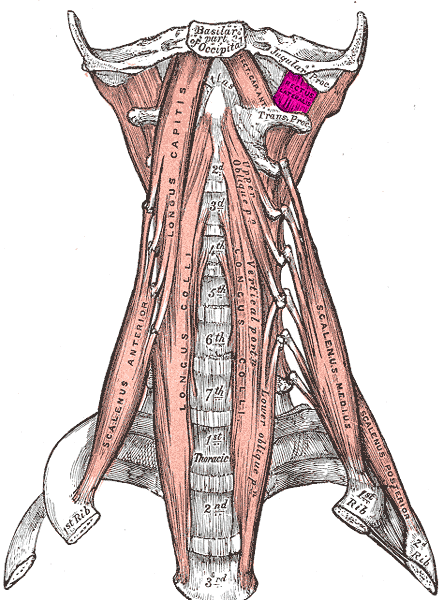
- The anterior vertebral muscles.

Details
- Origin: Upper surface of the transverse process of the atlas
- Insertion: Under surface of the jugular process of the occipital bone
- Nerve: C1, C2
- Actions: Lateral flexion, stabilise atlanto-occipital joint

Identifiers
- Latin: musculus rectus capitis lateralis
- TA98: A04.2.02.003
- TA2: 2151
- FMA: 46316

The rectus capitis lateralis, a short, flat muscle, arises from the upper surface of the transverse process of the atlas, and is inserted into the under surface of the jugular process of the occipital bone.

== Additional images ==
Position of rectus capitis lateralis muscle (shown in red). Animation.

Close up. Skull has been removed (except occipital bone).

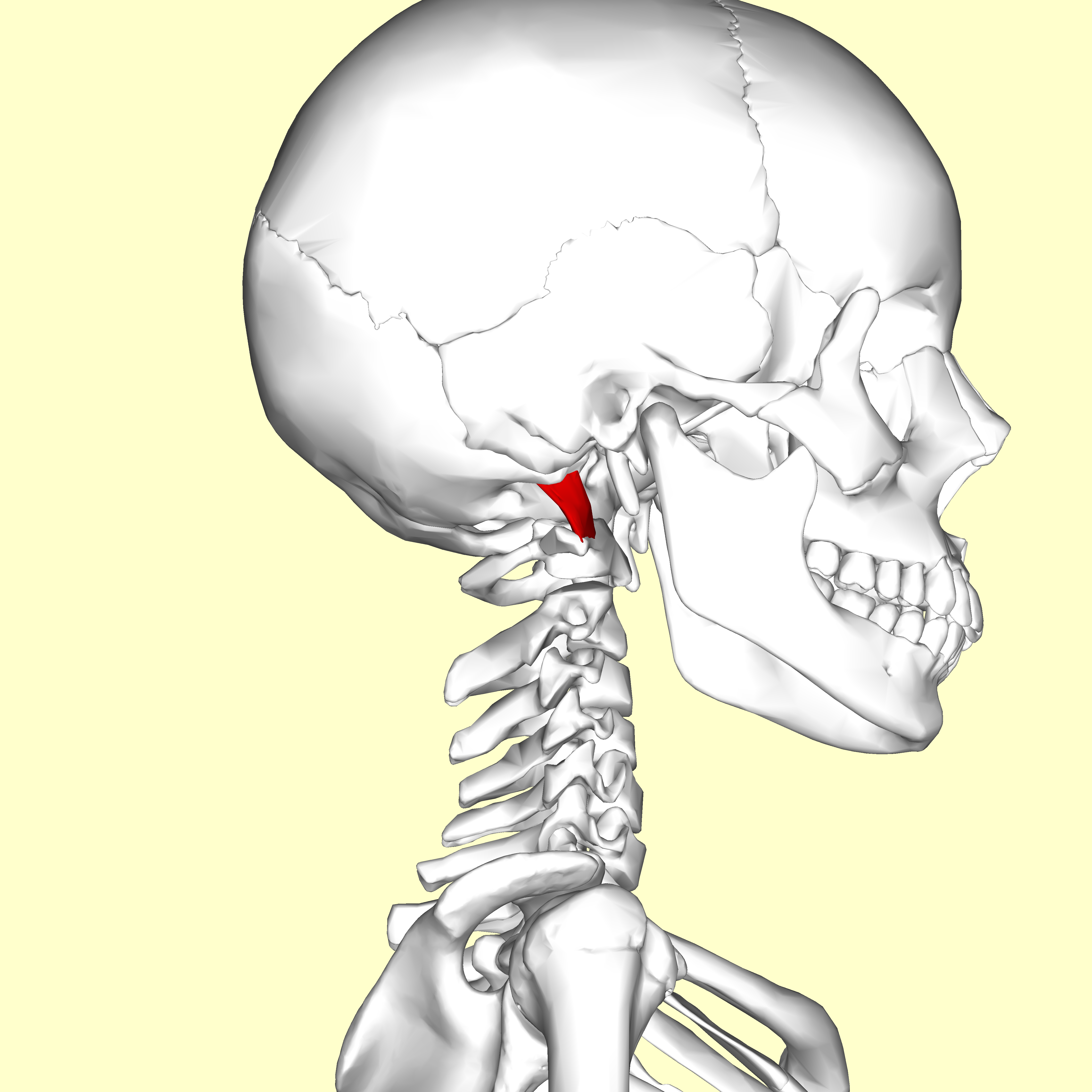
Lateral view. Still image.

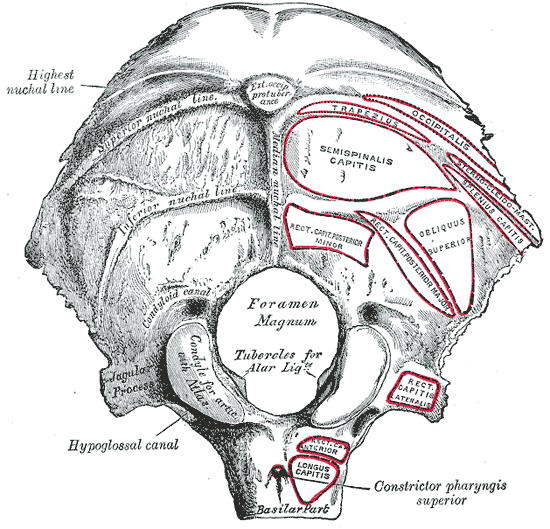
Occipital bone. Outer surface.

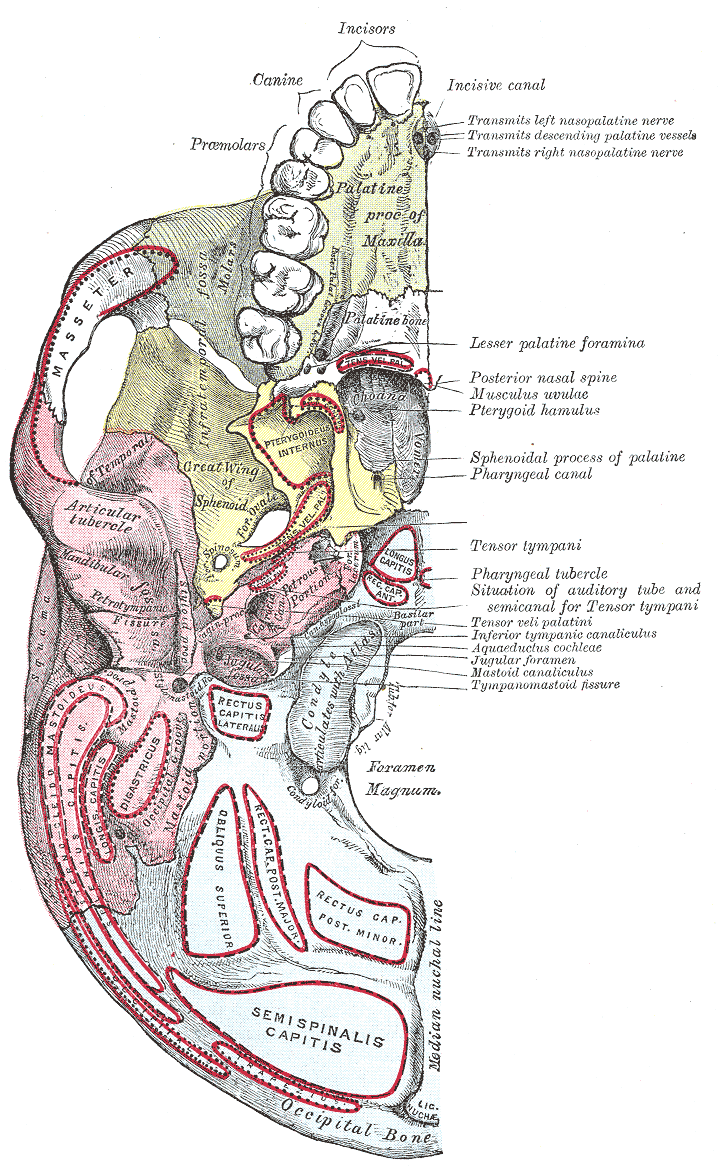
Base of skull. Inferior surface.

== See also ==
- Atlanto-occipital joint
- Rectus capitis posterior major muscle
- Rectus capitis posterior minor muscle
- Rectus capitis anterior muscle
