= Stylohyoid muscle =

Muscle in the neck

Stylohyoid
- The stylohyoid among the triangles of the neck.

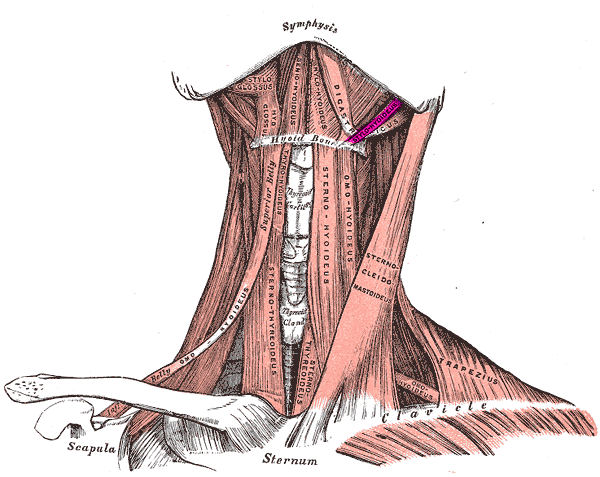
- Muscles of the neck. Anterior view. Stylohyoid muscle in purple

Details
- Origin: Styloid process (temporal)
- Insertion: Greater cornu of hyoid bone
- Nerve: Facial nerve (CN VII)
- Actions: Elevate the hyoid during swallowing

Identifiers
- Latin: musculus stylohyoideus
- TA98: A04.2.03.005
- TA2: 2164
- FMA: 9625

The stylohyoid muscle is one of the suprahyoid muscles. Its originates from the styloid process of the temporal bone; it inserts onto hyoid bone. It is innervated by a branch of the facial nerve. It acts to draw the hyoid bone upwards and backwards.

== Structure ==
The stylohyoid is a slender muscle. It is directed inferoanteriorly from its origin towards its insertion.

It is perforated near its insertion by the intermediate tendon of the digastric muscle.

=== Origin ===
The muscle arises from the posterior surface of the temporal styloid process; it arises near the base of the process. It arises by a small tendon of origin.

=== Insertion ===
The muscle inserts onto the body of hyoid bone at the junction of the body and greater cornu.

It passes anterior to the intermediate tendon of the digastric muscle and is inserted immediately superior to that of the superior belly of omohyoid muscle.

=== Vasculature ===
The stylohyoid muscle receives arterial supply branches of the facial artery, posterior auricular artery, and occipital artery.

=== Innervation ===
The stylohyoid muscle receives motor innervation from the stylohyoid branch of facial nerve (CN VII).

=== Relations ===
The muscle is situated anterosuperior to the posterior belly of the digastric muscle.

=== Variation ===
It may be absent or doubled. It may be situated medial to the carotid artery. It may insert suprahyoid muscles of infrahyoid muscles.

=== Actions/movements ===
The stylohyoid muscle elevates and retracts the hyoid bone (i.e. draws it superiorly and posteriorly).

== Function ==
The stylohyoid muscle elongates the floor of the mouth. It lifts the hyoid bone upward and backward, allowing for the opening of the mouth. This helps in speech and swallowing.

== Additional images ==
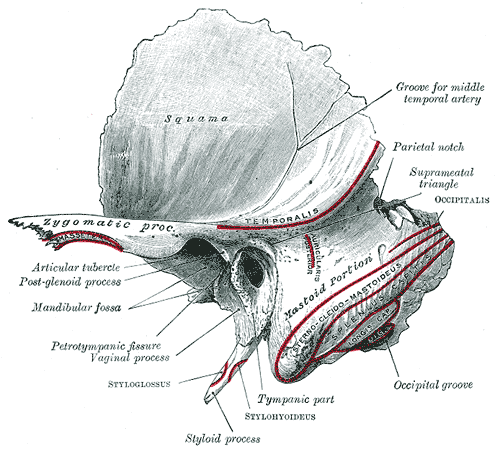
Left temporal bone. Outer surface.

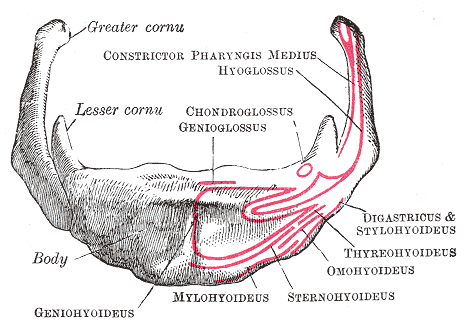
Hyoid bone. Anterior surface. Enlarged.

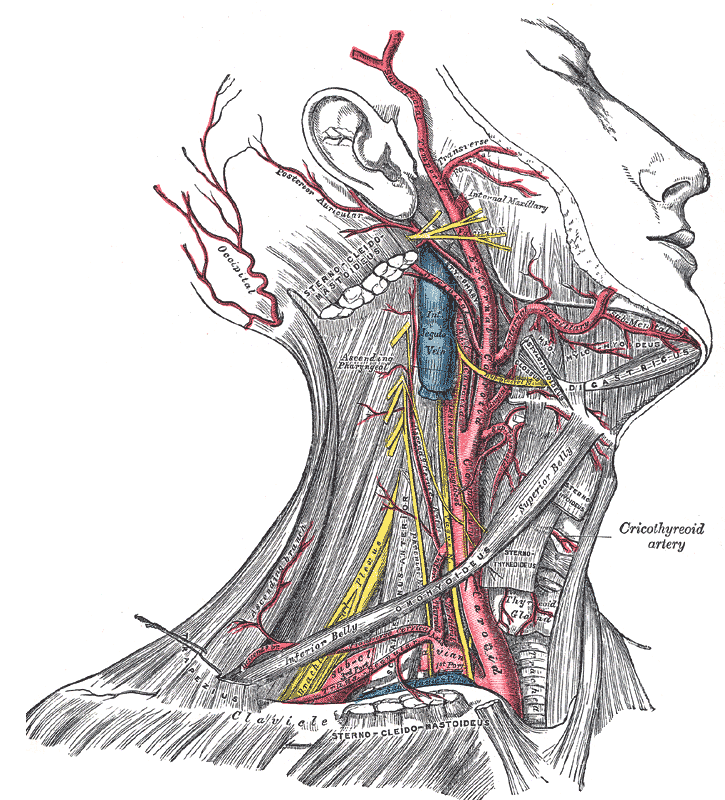
Superficial dissection of the right side of the neck, showing the carotid and subclavian arteries.

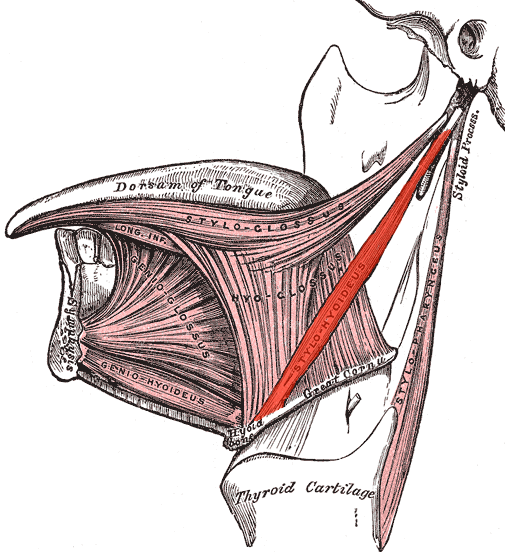
Extrinsic muscles of the tongue. Left side.

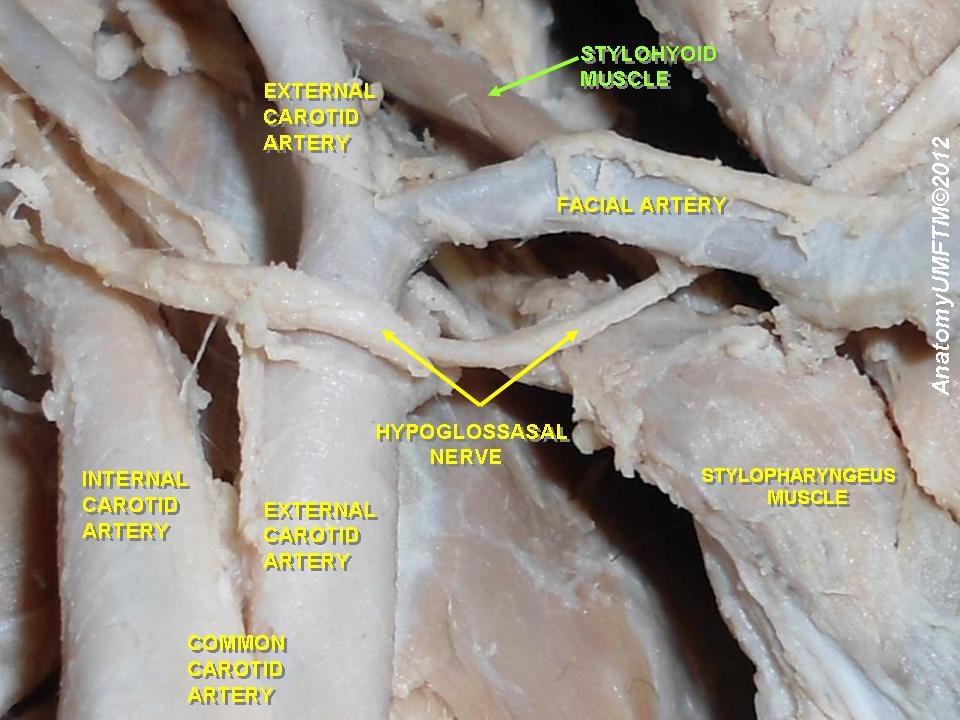
Stylohyoid muscle

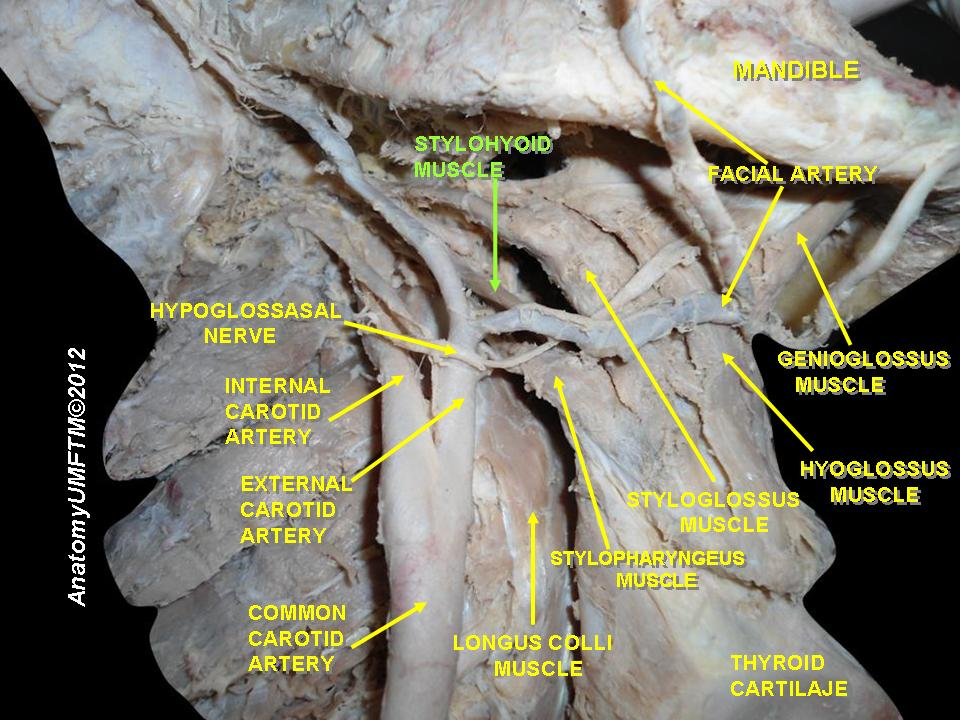
Stylohyoid muscle

== See also ==
- Stylohyoid ligament
