= Suprasternal notch =

Visible dip in the neck in humans

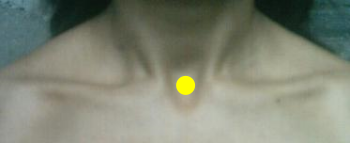
- Suprasternal notch (indicated by yellow circle)

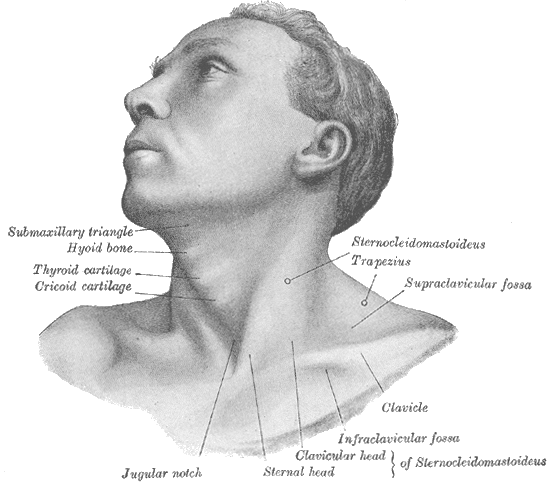
- The position of the suprasternal notch seen here, labelled as "jugular notch"

Details
- Location: Bottom of the neck; above the manubrium of the sternum, and between the two clavicles

Identifiers
- Latin: incisura jugularis sternalis, fossa jugularis sterni
- TA98: A02.3.03.004
- TA2: 1132
- FMA: 7542

The suprasternal notch, also known as the fossa jugularis sternalis, jugular notch, or Plender gap, is a large, visible dip in between the neck in humans, between the clavicles, and above the manubrium of the sternum.

Screenwriter Samson Raphaelson invented the term "ucipital mapilary" to describe the suprasternal notch for Suspicion (1941), directed by Alfred Hitchcock.

== Structure ==
The suprasternal notch is a visible dip at the bottom of the front of the neck, between the clavicles, and above the manubrium of the sternum. It is at the level of the T2 and T3 vertebrae. The trachea lies just behind it, rising about 5 cm above it in adults.

== Clinical significance ==
Intrathoracic pressure is measured by using a transducer held in such a way over the body that an actuator engages the soft tissue that is located above the suprasternal notch. Arcot J. Chandrasekhar, MD of Loyola University, Chicago, is the author of an evaluative test for the aorta using the suprasternal notch. The test can help recognize the following conditions:

- Aneurysm
- Dissecting aneurysm
- Atherosclerosis
- Hypertension

To carry out this test, it is necessary to place an index finger or middle finger on the notch and palpate it. A prominent pulse may be indicative of an uncoiled aorta, an arch aneurysm, or a tortuous blood vessel.

The supersternal notch is being investigated as a site for placing wearable technology for monitoring swallowing, respiration, cardiac activity, vocal-fold vibrations and other body activities.
