= Emissary veins =

Anatomical feature of the circulatory system

Details

Identifiers
- Latin: vena emissaria
- TA98: A12.0.00.033; A12.3.05.301
- TA2: 4872
- FMA: 50790

The emissary veins connect the extracranial venous system with the intracranial venous sinuses. They connect the veins outside the cranium to the venous sinuses inside the cranium. They drain from the scalp, through the skull, into the larger meningeal veins and dural venous sinuses. They may also connect to diploic veins within the skull.

Emissary veins have an important role in selective cooling of the head. They also serve as routes where infections are carried into the cranial cavity from the extracranial veins to the intracranial veins.

There are several types of emissary veins including the posterior condyloid, mastoid, occipital and parietal emissary veins.

== Structure ==
There are also emissary veins passing through the foramen ovale, jugular foramen, foramen lacerum, and hypoglossal canal.

Coronal cross section of skull showing venous drainage, with emissary vein uppermost

== Function ==
Because the emissary veins are valveless, they are an important part in selective brain cooling through bidirectional flow of cooler blood from the evaporating surface of the head. In general, blood flow is from external to internal but the flow can be altered by increased intracranial pressure.

== Clinical significance ==
One notable emissary vein, the vein of Vesalius, travels through the sphenoidal emissary foramen inferior to the zygomatic arch, connecting the pterygoid plexus with the cavernous sinus. This is an important route for the spread of infection as cranial nerve VI and the internal carotid pass through the cavernous sinus, with cranial nerves III, IV, V1, and V2 passing alongside the lateral wall of the sinus. Subsequent infection or inflammation in the cavernous sinus can result in septic cavernous sinus thrombosis, with resultant damage to the cranial nerves contained within, as well as further spread of the infection leading to meningitis.

Rupture of an emissary vein can result in a subgaleal hemorrhage, a rare but serious injury most often seen as a complication of vacuum extraction.
