= Hypoglossal canal =

Hole in the occipital bone of the skull

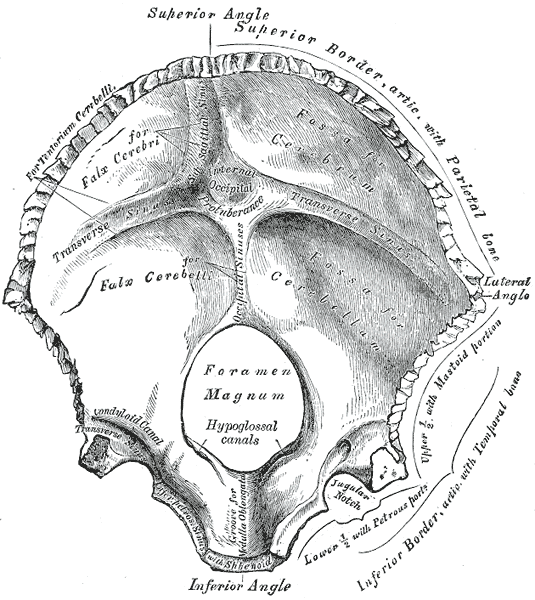
- Occipital bone. Inner surface.

Details
- Part of: Occipital bone
- System: Skeletal

Identifiers
- Latin: canalis nervi hypoglossi
- TA98: A02.1.04.016
- TA2: 559
- FMA: 75370

The hypoglossal canal is a foramen in the occipital bone of the skull. It is hidden medially and superiorly to each occipital condyle. It transmits the hypoglossal nerve.

== Structure ==
The hypoglossal canal lies in the epiphyseal junction between the basiocciput and the jugular process of the occipital bone.

=== Variation ===
Embryonic variants sometimes lead to the presence of more than two canals as the occipital bone is formed.

=== Development ===
The hypoglossal canal is formed during the embryological stage of development in mammals.

== Function ==
The hypoglossal canal transmits the hypoglossal nerve from its point of entry near the medulla oblongata to its exit from the base of the skull near the jugular foramen.

== Clinical significance ==
Study of the hypoglossal canal aids in the diagnosis of a variety of tumors found at the base of the skull. Benign tumors involving the hypoglossal nerve and canal include large glomus jugulare neoplasms. Malignant tumors revolving around the hypoglossal canal can include metastases, myeloma, neural tumors such as neuroma and schwannoma; meningioma can also occur occasionally. Malignant neoplasms that may involve the canal include squamous-cell carcinoma of the head and neck. Studies of the hypoglossal canal revolve around the development of safe drilling techniques to conduct surgery on that area of the brain. Due to the path that the hypoglossal nerve through the canal and the venous plexus surrounds nerve bundles, a surgeon may not need to be concerned if some bleeding occurs from the posterolateral edge of the hypoglossal canal during surgery.

== Research ==
The hypoglossal canal has recently been used to try to determine the antiquity of human speech. Researchers have found that hominids who lived as long as 2 million years ago had the same size canal as that of modern-day chimpanzees; some scientists thus assume they were incapable of speech. However, archaic Homo sapiens 400,000 years ago had the same size canal as that of modern humans, meaning they could have been capable of speech. Some Neanderthals also had the same size hypoglossal canal as archaic H. sapiens. However recent studies involving several primate species have failed to find conclusive evidence of a relationship between its size and speech.

== Additional images ==
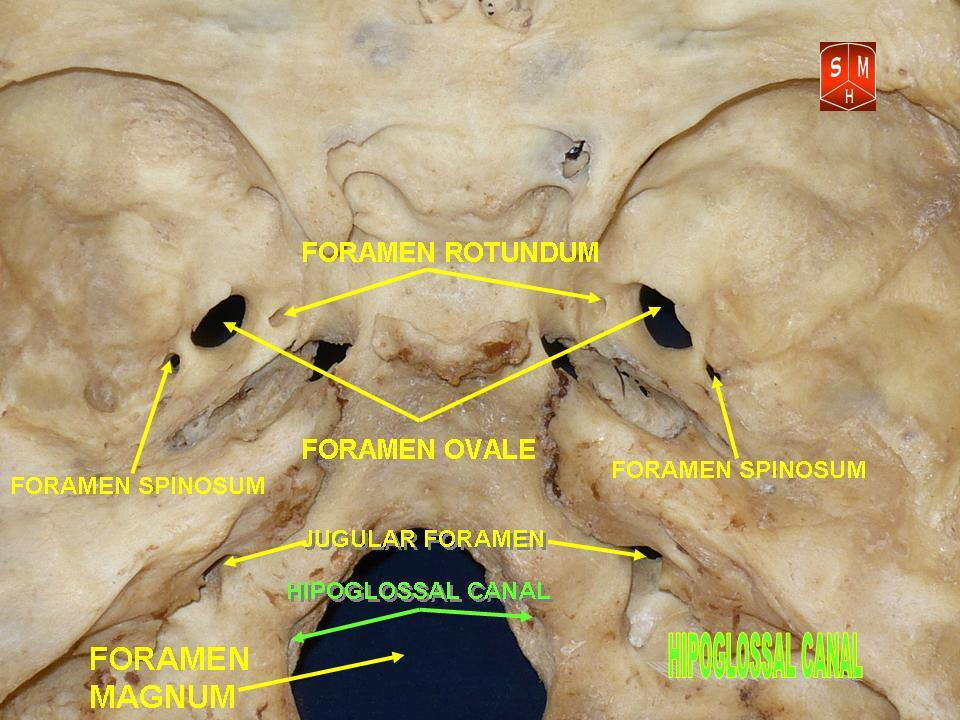
Hypoglossal canal

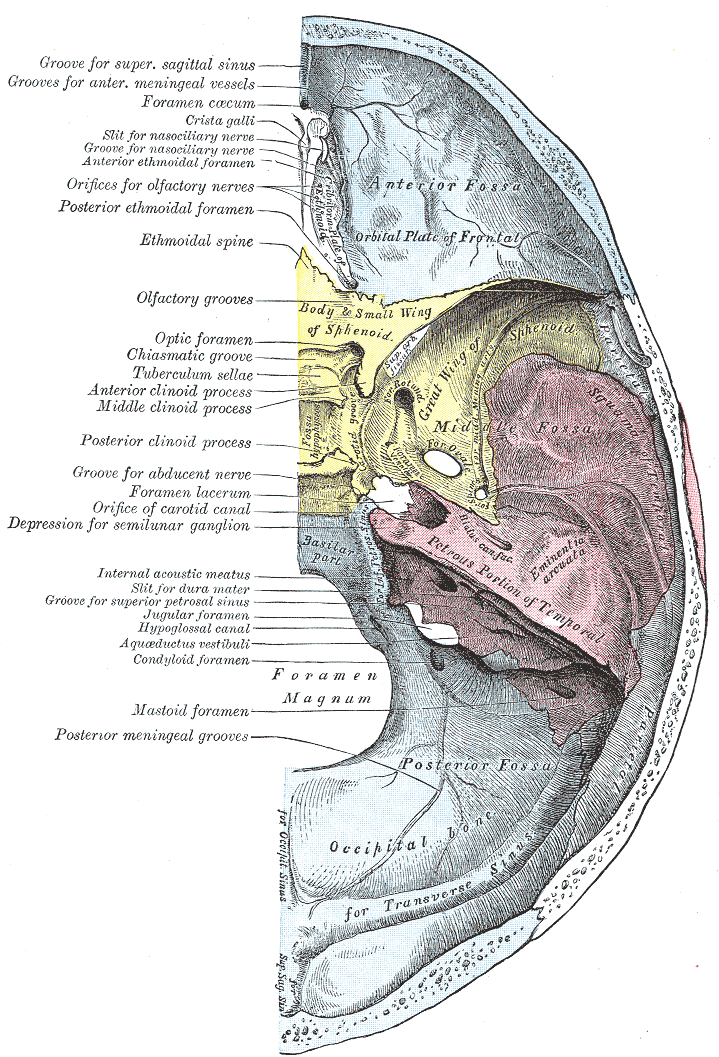
Base of the skull. Upper surface.

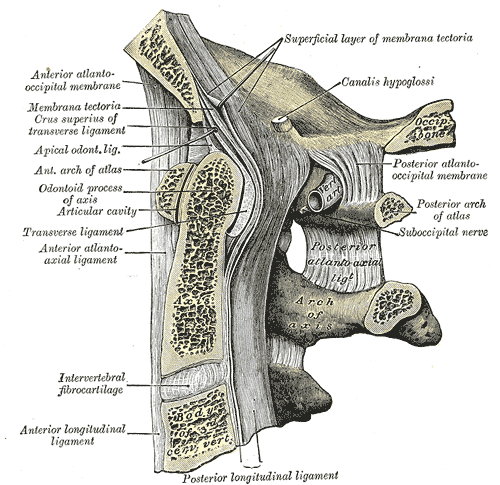
Median sagittal section through the occipital bone and first three cervical vertebræ.

== See also ==
- Occipital bone
- Hypoglossal nerve
- Occipital condyle
