= Platelet-rich fibrin =

Plasma proteins arranged in a fibrin matrix

Platelet-rich fibrin (PRF) or leukocyte- and platelet-rich fibrin (L-PRF) is a derivative of PRP where autologous platelets and leukocytes are present in a complex fibrin matrix to accelerate the healing of soft and hard tissue and is used as a tissue-engineering scaffold in oral and maxillofacial surgeries. PRF falls under FDA Product Code KST, labeling it as a blood draw/Hematology product classifying it as 510(k) exempt.

To obtain PRF, the required quantity of blood is drawn into test tubes without an anticoagulant and centrifuged immediately. Blood can be centrifuged using a tabletop centrifuge from 3-8 minutes for 1300 revolutions per minute. The resultant product consists of the following three layers: the topmost layer consisting of platelet poor plasma, the PRF clot in the middle, and the red blood cells (RBC) at the bottom. The PRF clot can be removed from the test tube using a pickup instrument (such as Gerald tissue forceps). The RBC layer attached to the PRF clot can be carefully removed using scissors or a blunt instrument.

Platelet activation in response to tissue damage occurs during the process of making PRF release several biologically active proteins including; platelet alpha granules, platelet‑derived growth factor (PDGF), transforming growth factors‑β (TGF‑β), vascular endothelial growth factor (VEGF), and epidermal growth factor. Actually, the platelets and leukocyte cytokines play important parts in role of this biomaterial, but the fibrin matrix supporting them is the most helpful in constituting the determining elements responsible for real therapeutic potential of PRF. Cytokines are immediately used and destroyed in a healing wound. The harmony between cytokines and their supporting fibrin matrix has much more importance than any other platelet derivatives.

== Dentistry ==
=== Ridge preservation ===
Ridge preservation (Colloquially Socket preservation), a procedure to reduce bone loss after tooth extraction to preserve the dental alveolus (containing the tooth socket) in the alveolar bone. A platelet-rich fibrin (PRF) membrane containing bone growth enhancing elements can be stitched over the wound or a graft material or scaffold is placed in the socket of an extracted tooth at the time of extraction. The socket is then directly closed with stitches or covered with a non-resorbable or resorbable membrane and sutured.

=== Sinus lift ===
A platelet-rich fibrin can be used if a sinus lift is required for a dental implant.

=== Periodontal regeneration ===
Reproduction or reconstitution of a lost or injured part to restore the architecture and function of the periodontium becomes the integral part of comprehensive periodontal therapy. Conventional open flap debridement falls short of regenerating tissues destroyed by the disease. Platelet derived growth factor along with bone morphogenetic proteins are among the most researched growth factors in periodontal regeneration. Platelet rich fibrin showed significant improvement in clinical periodontal parameter as well as in radiograph when compared with open flap debridement alone in a meta analysis. Several bone graft materials have been used in the treatment of infrabony defects. Demineralized freeze dried bone allograft (DFDBA) has been histologically proven to be the material of choice for regeneration. Platelet-rich fibrin has shown significant results comparable to DFDBA for periodontal regeneration. One of the most common aesthetic problem encountered in the field of periodontology is gingival recession, which is perceived by the patients as increase in length of teeth. Though connective tissue graft is a gold standard procedure, PRF can be used as an alternative procedure by keeping patient's comfort in mind.

=== Guided bone and tissue regeneration ===
PRF is used in guided bone and tissue regeneration.

=== Regenerative endodontics ===
PRF enhances alveolar bone augmentation and necrotic dental pulp and open tooth apex can be revitalized in regenerative endodontics with platelet-rich fibrin.

== See also ==
- Dressing (medical)
- Platelet alpha-granule
