= Stefano Scavia =

Italian dentist and oral surgeon

Stefano Scavia is an Italian dentist, practicing oral surgery, dental implantology, and alveolar bone augmentation. He works with the Odontoaesthetics dental clinic in Basiglio, near Milan, and he is also an author of several clinical studies on minimally invasive oral surgical techniques.

== Career ==
Scavia’s clinical practice included dental implantology, regenerative oral surgery, and minimally invasive techniques of oral tissues reconstruction. Scavia was associated with the Odontoaesthetics dental clinic in Basiglio, near Milan. Scavia’s clinical practice, including his use of biomimetic techniques, was described in the 2025 Valore Medico article.

In the 2022–2023 academic year, Stefano Scavia was the teacher of the elective course Surgical Mini Invasive Technique at the University of Milano-Bicocca. University’s syllabus included Scavia as the instructor of the course of post-extraction implantology, bone regeneration, and minimally invasive surgical techniques. University’s Public Register of Transparency included 2022 professorship appointment in connection with the Department of Medicine and Surgery of the University of Milano-Bicocca. Moreover, Italian press in July 2023 mentioned Scavia as a university lecturer.

University’s institutional repository of research included Stefano Scavia in connection with the Department of Medicine and Surgery of the University of Milano-Bicocca. University's institutional repository of research also included Scavia’s 2021 scientific publication on guided bone regeneration.

In 2022, Forbes Italia announced that Scavia received implantology certification from the Italian Academy of Osseointegration (IAO).

== Research ==
Scavia's clinical publications have addressed augmentation and preservation of bone around dental implants. In a 2015 study published in Dental Cadmos, Scavia and colleagues examined the use of nano-hydroxyapatite combined with polylactic and polyglycolic acids for alveolar socket and ridge preservation following tooth extraction.

In 2020 he co-authored a paper in The Journal of Contemporary Dental Practice presenting preliminary results of a flapless, piezotome-assisted alveolar ridge splitting technique. A 2021 paper in the same journal presented preliminary results for vertical bone augmentation using a guided bone regeneration pocket technique.

In 2023, Scavia and Marcello Maddalone published a retrospective study of a flapless split-crest procedure involving a connective tissue graft and dental implants. Two publications from 2024 examined other techniques: a case series with Stefano Salgarello and Elisabetta Audino on ridge preservation following tooth extraction in cases with oroantral communication, and a study with A. Baruffaldi on a crestal sinus lift approach.

In 2024, Scavia published a clinical case report in Implants – International Magazine of Oral Implantology describing a single-stage procedure involving post-extraction implant placement, hard- and soft-tissue augmentation, periodontal regeneration and immediate fixed prosthetic rehabilitation.

In 2025, Scavia co-authored a case report with Luca Ferrantino and Andrea Baruffaldi in Annals of Stomatology, describing a two-stage surgical technique for severe three-dimensional alveolar bone atrophy associated with periodontal attachment loss.

== Public commentary ==
Scavia has provided comments to Italian news outlets on dental prevention and developments in dental technology. Il Messaggero quoted him in April 2023 about oral health and early childhood dental care. In July 2023, La Stampa and il Giornale published his advice about dental problems during summer travel. A 2025 Fortune Italia article included his comments about artificial intelligence, robotics and imaging in dental surgery.
