= Clune (disambiguation) =

Clune is a surname.

Clune may also refer to:

- Clune, Pennsylvania, an unincorporated community in the United States
- Clune Arena, a basketball venue at the United States Air Force Academy in Colorado Springs
- Clune Building, a historic site in Miami Springs, Florida
- Easter Clune Castle, a ruined castle in Scotland
- Clune Park, a former football ground in Scotland
- Clune's Auditorium, a former name of Hazard's Pavilion, a defunct auditorium in Los Angeles

== See also ==
- Cluneal (disambiguation)
- Clunes (disambiguation)
