= Clune =

Surname

- Language: English

Origin
- Language: Irish
- Origin: Mac Cluanain or O Cluanain
- Meaning: "cluana" (deceitful, flattering, or rogue) or "glun" (knee)

Other names
- Variant forms: Clunes, Cluen, Cluin (McCluin and McGluin), Cloon

Clune is an anglicised form of the Irish names of either O Cluanain or McCluin. O Cluanain derives from the Irish "cluana" meaning either "deceitful", "flattering" or "rogue." McCluin comes from the Irish Gaelic "glun" meaning "knee". The surname was originally McClune in County Clare, where it may have originated.

== People ==
Notable people with the surname include:

- Adam Clune (born 1995), Australian rugby league player
- Agnes Clune Quinlan (1873-1949), Irish composer
- Conor Clune (1893–1920), Irish scholar and activist killed during Bloody Sunday (1920)
- Daniel A. Clune (born 1949), United States diplomat
- Deirdre Clune (born 1959), Irish politician
- Don Clune (born 1952), American football player
- Frank Clune (1893–1971), Australian writer
- Henry W. Clune (1890–1995), American journalist and novelist
- Jackie Clune (born 1965), British entertainer and writer
- John J. Clune (1932–1992), former director of athletics at the United States Air Force Academy
- Mayv Clune (1999), University of Maryland D1 Field Hockey Player
- Michael W. Clune, American writer
- Patrick Clune (1865–1935), Catholic Archbishop of Perth, Western Australia
- Richard Clune (born 1987), Canadian ice hockey player
- Russ Clune (1959), Professional Rock Climber and Author
- Thelma Clune (1900–1992), Australian artist
- Wally Clune (1930–1998), Canadian retired ice hockey player
- W. H. Clune (1862–1927), American railroad owner and filmmaker

== See also ==
- Clune (disambiguation)
- Clunn (surname)
- Clunes
