= Socket preservation =

Medical procedure to reduce bone loss after tooth extraction

Socket preservation or alveolar ridge preservation is a procedure to reduce bone loss after tooth extraction. After tooth extraction, the jaw bone has a natural tendency to become narrow, and lose its original shape because the bone quickly resorbs, resulting in 30–60% loss in bone volume in the first six months. Bone loss, can compromise the ability to place a dental implant (to replace the tooth), or its aesthetics and functional ability.

Socket preservation attempts to prevent bone loss by bone grafting the socket immediately after extraction. With the procedure, the gum is retracted, the tooth is removed, material (usually a bone substitute) is placed in the tooth socket, it is covered with a barrier membrane, and sutured closed. Roughly 30 days after socket preservation, the barrier membrane is either removed, or it resorbs, and the callous of bone covers with new gingiva. While there is good evidence that socket preservation prevents bone loss, there is no definitive proof that this leads to higher implants success or long-term health.

== Medical uses ==
After tooth extraction, the alveolar ridge has a mean loss of width of 3.8 mm, and a height loss of 1.24 mm within six months. This loss of bone volume, can cause a denture to be loose, or an inadequate amount of bone width to place an implant. Historically, alveolar preservation was used to provide a base to retain conventional dentures. Advances in osseointegration have expanded the need of the procedure to maintain ridge width and height for dental implant placement. In some cases, where a tooth requires removal when other teeth still need to erupt, socket preservation may be used to maintain bone for the formative tooth to erupt into.

== Risks and complications ==
While there are no absolute contraindications to socket preservation, many of the same cautions that apply to surgery on the jaws still apply to this procedure. Significant caution is required in an area previously exposed to radiation treatment, or in an area that has previously had osteomyelitis. Other considerations to bone healing include the concurrent use of bisphosphonate, and denosumab, smoking, diabetes, immunocompromise, and infection.

Another consideration is the risk of bone and soft tissue loss on the subsequent implant in the long-term. Socket preservation has been associated with a greater risk of marginal bone loss

== Technique ==
Socket preservation is completed at the time of extraction. After removal of the tooth, the gum is elevated away from the bone, the socket is thoroughly cleansed, and antibiotic powder may be used. A barrier membrane is then fastened to the gum, the socket is packed with bone grafting material and the wound closed over the barrier membrane. Where the barrier membrane does not dissolve, it is removed approximately 30 days after placement, and the graft becomes incorporated into the healing bone 3–9 months later.

Socket preservation of lower right 1st molar

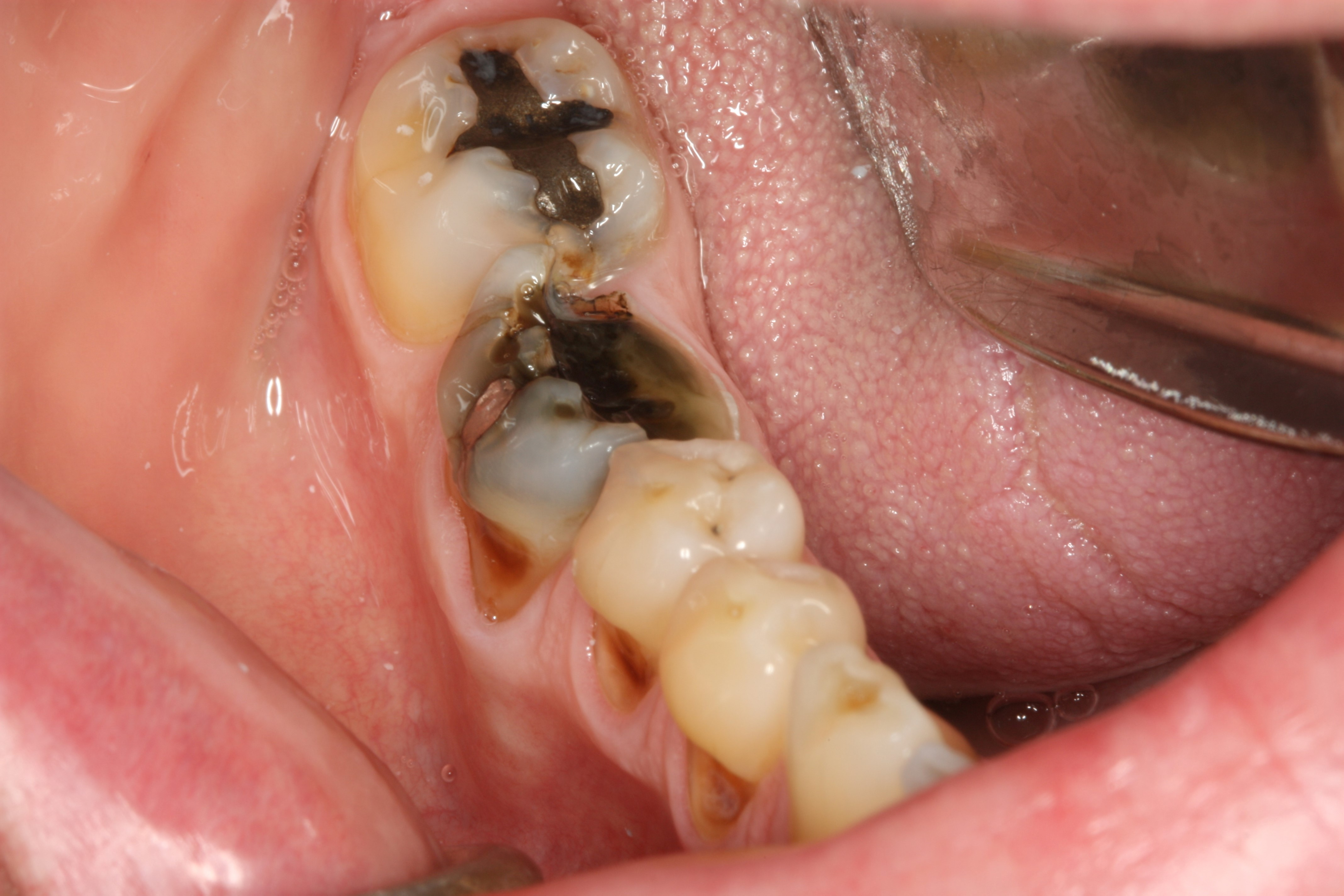
Broken tooth for extraction. Right lower 1st molar.

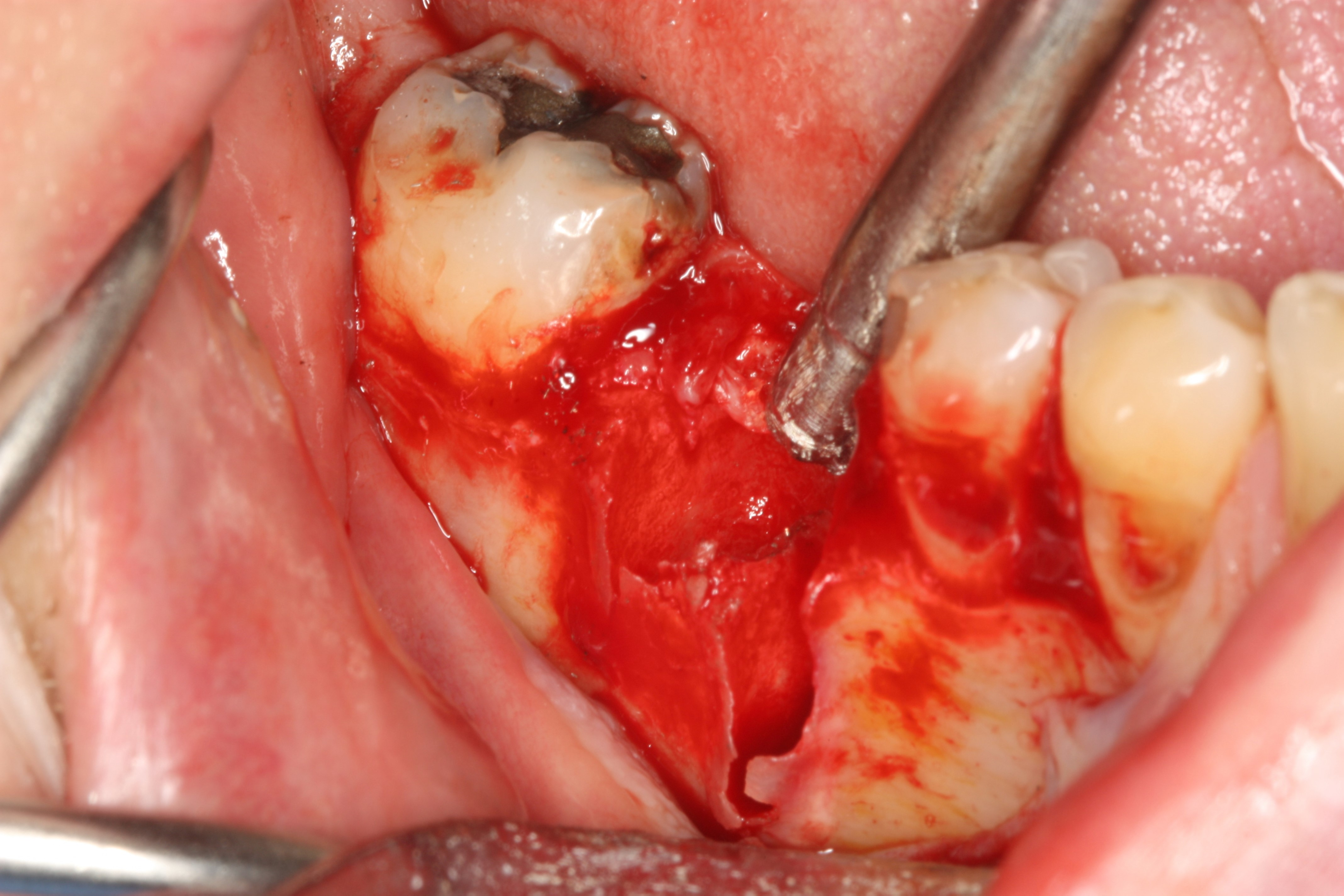
Tooth removed, and socket missing bone to the buccal

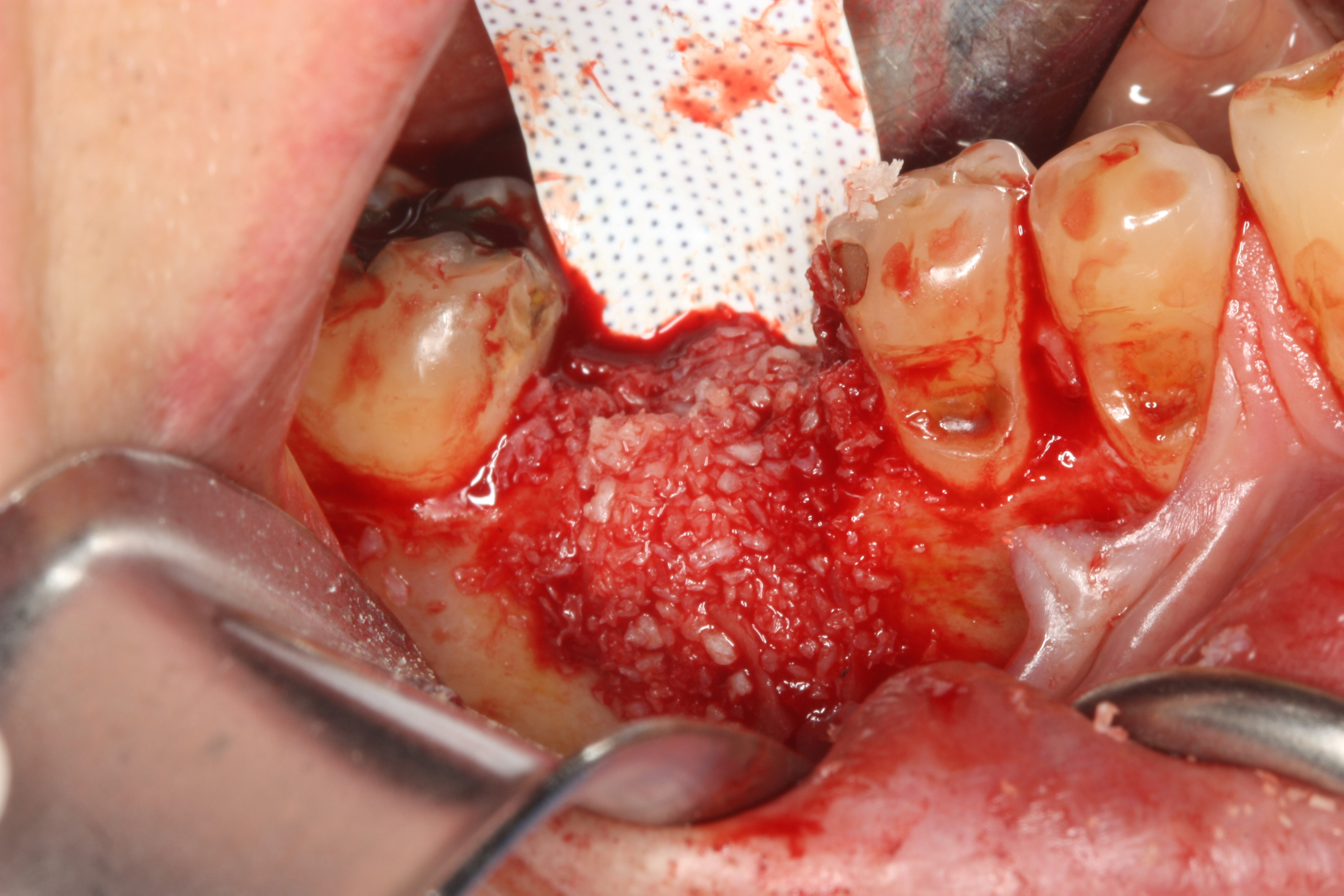
Socket filled with bone, membrane secure on the tongue side

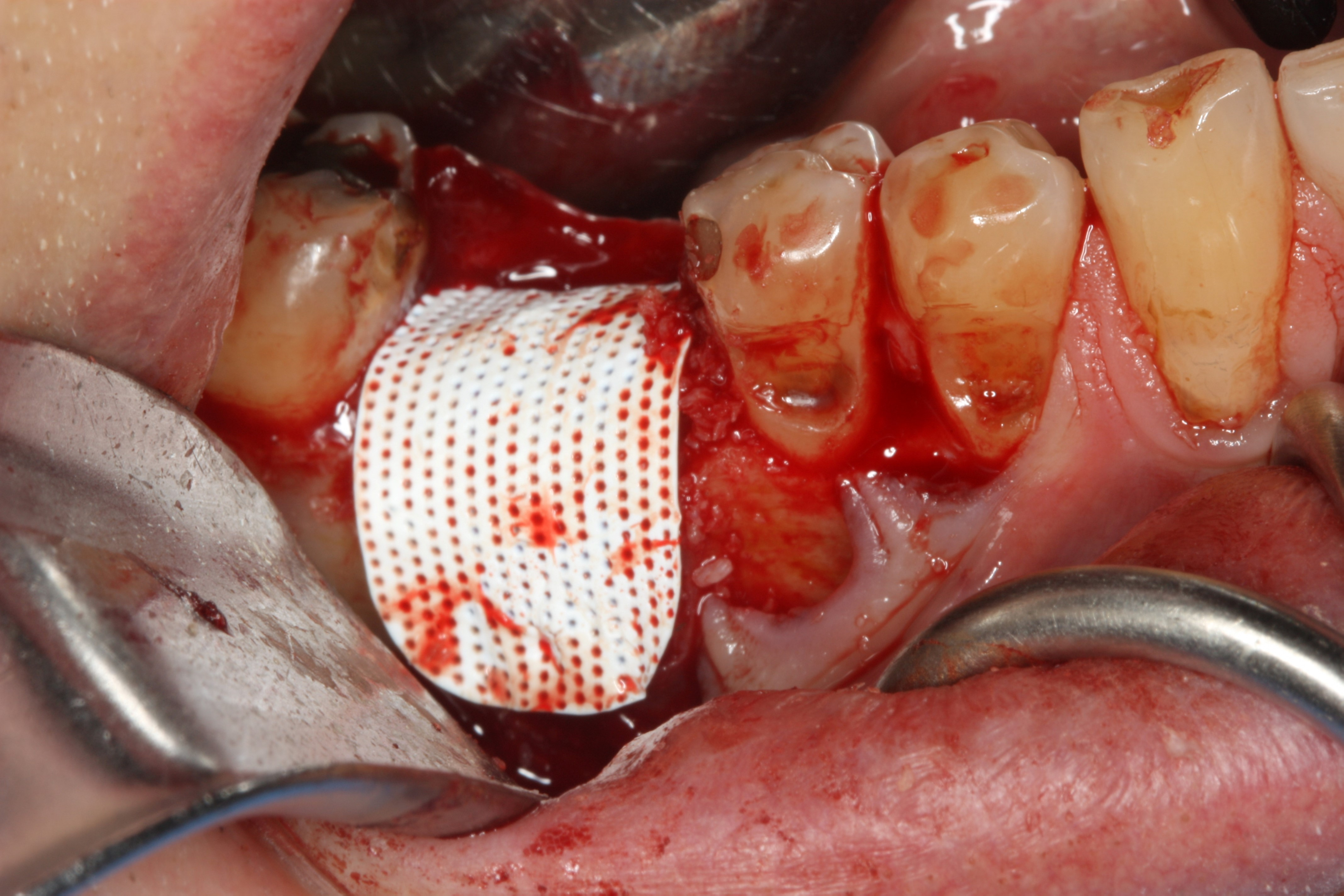
Barrier membrane covering the bone

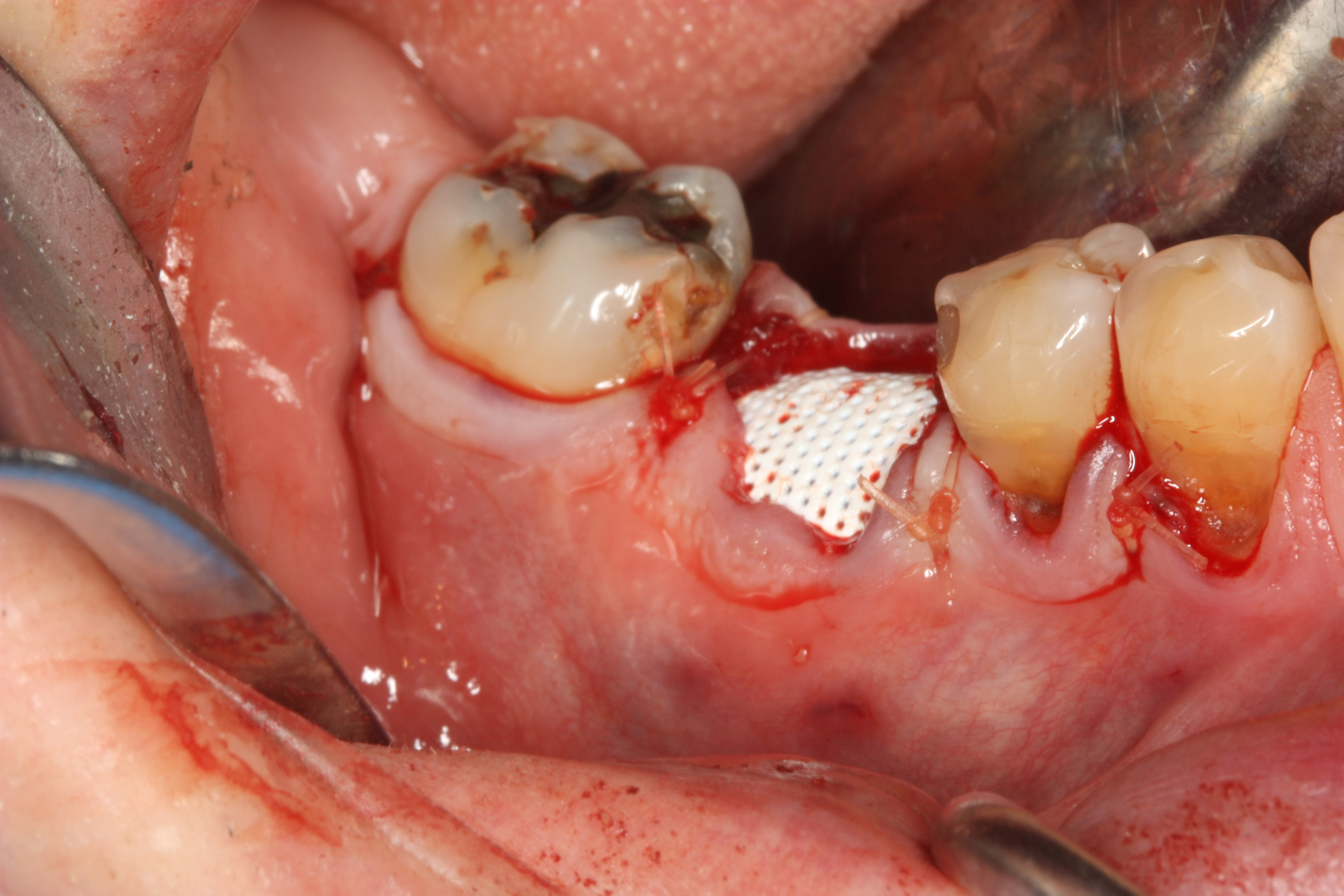
Gingiva closed over the graft

=== Material types ===
Bone grafting materials can be divided into several categories. Autograft (bone harvested from patient's own body) is considered the gold standard, and all other materials are generally compared to it. Other types of grafting material include xenograft (bone grafts or collagen from bovine or porcine origin), allograft (block bone graft from a cadaver), and alloplast (synthetic biomaterials such as fibrin scaffolds, PLGA, synthetic biodegradable polymer, hydroxyapatite, tricalcium phosphate, bioglass).

Barrier membranes can be either resorbable, or non-resorbable. The standard non-resorbable membrane is expanded polytetrafluoroethylene (ePTFE) which was first used in 1984, when it was found to be biocompatible. There are a variety of resorbable membranes, including collagen, and synthetic resorbable (lactic acid or glycolic acid).

== Benefits ==
Socket preservation procedure prevents immediate bone resorption after extraction thus keeping the contour and integrity of the socket with a successful and natural-looking appearance for tooth restorative procedures. All dental prosthesis requires good jaw bone support for it to be successful in the long run. Without socket preservation, residual bones could lose volume resulting in loss of facial vertical and horizontal dimension and changes in facial soft tissues aesthetics.

Socket preservation does indeed improve the height and width, compared to extraction without socket preservation, but there is insufficient data to conclude that it decreases implant failures, improves aesthetics, or that one grafting material is any better than another.

== See also ==
- Guided bone and tissue regeneration
- Tooth regeneration
