= Guided bone and tissue regeneration (dentistry) =

Directed tissue repair and renewal processes

- MeSH: D048091

Guided bone regeneration (GBR) and guided tissue regeneration (GTR) are dental surgical procedures that use barrier membranes to direct the growth of new bone and gingival tissue at sites with insufficient volumes or dimensions of bone or gingiva for proper function, esthetics or prosthetic restoration. Guided bone regeneration typically refers to ridge augmentation or bone regenerative procedures; guided tissue regeneration typically refers to regeneration of periodontal attachment.

Guided bone regeneration is similar to guided tissue regeneration, but is focused on development of hard tissues in addition to the soft tissues of the periodontal attachment. At present, guided bone regeneration is predominantly applied in the oral cavity to support new hard tissue growth on an alveolar ridge to allow stable placement of dental implants. When bone grafting is used in conjunction with sound surgical technique, guided bone regeneration is a reliable and validated procedure.

== History ==
Use of barrier membranes to direct bone regeneration was first described in the context of orthopaedic research 1959. The theoretical principles basic to guided tissue regeneration were developed by Melcher in 1976, who outlined the necessity of excluding unwanted cell lines from healing sites to allow growth of desired tissues. Based on positive clinical results of regeneration in periodontology research in the 1980s, research began to focus on the potential for re-building alveolar bone defects using guided bone regeneration. The theory of Guided tissue regeneration has been challenged in dentistry. The GBR principle was first examined by Dahlin et al. in 1988 on rats. In 1988, Swiss oral and maxillofacial surgeon Daniel Buser performed one of the first documented Guided Bone Regeneration procedures at the University of Bern. The selective ingrowth of bone-forming cells into a bone defect region could be improved if the adjacent tissue is kept away with a membrane; this was confirmed in a study by Kostopoulos and Karring in 1994. GBR can be used for bone regeneration on exposed implant coils .

== Overview ==
Four stages are used to successfully regenerate bone and other tissues, abbreviated with the acronym PASS:

1. Primary closure of the wound to promote undisturbed and uninterrupted healing
2. Angiogenesis to provide necessary blood supply and undifferentiated mesenchymal cells
3. Space creation and maintenance to facilitate space for bone in-growth
4. Stability of the wound to induce blood clot formation and allow uneventful healing

After tooth removal, it takes 40 days for the normal healing process to take place (clot formation to socket filled with bone, connective tissue and epithelium).

== Application ==
The first application of barrier membranes in the mouth occurred in 1982 in the context of regeneration of periodontal tissues via GTR, as an alternative to resective surgical procedures to reduce pocket depths. A barrier membrane is utilized in the GBR technique to cover the bone defect and create a secluded space, which prevents the connective tissue from growing into the space and facilitates the growth priority of bone tissue. An added benefit of the membrane is that it provides protection of the wound from mechanical disruption and salivary contamination.

Barrier membrane criteria should be as follows:

- Biocompatible
- Excludes unwanted cell types
- Allows tissue integration
- Creates and maintains space
- Is easy to trim and place

Several surgical techniques via GBR have been proposed regarding the tri-dimensional bone reconstruction of the severely resorbed maxilla, using different types of bone substitutes that have regenerative, osseoinductive or osseoconductive properties which is then packed into the bony defect and covered by resorbable membranes. In cases where augmentation materials used are autografts (tissue transfer from same person) or allografts (tissue from genetically dissimilar members of same species) the bone density is quite low and resorption of the grafted site in these cases can reach up to 30% of original volume. Other materials available xenografts (tissue donor from another species) and autogenous bone. For higher predictability, nonresorbable titanium-reinforced d-polytetrafluoroethylene (d-PTFE) membranes—as a barrier against the migration of epithelial cells within the grafted site—are recommended. In patients with systemic problems interdisciplinary collaboration is indicated to adjust therapy background so that it does not adversely affect implanto-prosthetic treatment. Current treatments for destructive periodontal disease are not able to restore damaged bone and connective tissue support for teeth (infra-bony defects).

Currently there are two types of barrier membranes available: resorbable and non-resorbable.

Non-resorbable membranes:

The main types of non-resorbable barrier membranes are expanded polytetrafluoroethylene (e-PTFE), high-density polytetrafluoroethylene (d-PTFE), titanium mesh and titanium-reinforced PTFE.

Expanded polytetrafluoroethylene (e-PTFE) became the most common non-resorbable membrane used for bone regeneration in the 1990s. Gore-Tex was the most popular type of e-PTFE. The e-PTFE membrane is sintered with pores of 5 - 20 μm within the framework of the material. The e-PTFE membrane behaves as a barrier to prevent fibroblasts and various connective-tissue cells from entering the bone defect in order to allow the slower moving cells that are osteogenic to repopulate the defect. A study used e-PTFE membranes to cover surgically constructed average size bone defects in the mandibular angles of rats. Consequently, the e-PTFE membrane acted as a barrier to soft tissue and sped up bone healing, which took place between 3–6 weeks while no healing occurred in the non-membrane control group during a 22 week period.

The biological method of osteopromotion by exclusion is good for predicting ridge growth or defect regeneration.

Resorbable membranes:

There are many different types of resorbable membranes out there but the main ones are synthetic polymers and natural biomaterials. Synthetic polymers are such that it is a polylactic acid bilayer, or the collagen-derived membranes. These membranes can be obtained from bovine or porcine or dermis. E.g. Emdogain which has been shown to significantly improve probing attachment levels (1.1mm) and periodontal pocket depth reduction (0.9mm) when compared to a placebo or control materials. Resorption rates ranging from six to 24 weeks depending on its different chemical structures. With the resorbable membrane used, the membrane will bio-degrade. There is no need for a second surgery to remove the membrane, this will prevent any disruption to the healing process of the regenerated tissues. A synthetic resorbable membrane (eg: Powerbone Barrier Membrane) is an ideal alternative to the resorbable collagen material. Randomised clinical trials compared the stability of augmented bone between a synthetic resorbable membrane and a collagen membrane with guided bone regeneration simultaneous to dental implant placement in the aesthetic zone in terms of facial bone thickness.

Success depends on several factors: osteoblasts being present at the site, a sufficient blood supply, stabilisation of the graft during healing, and soft tissue not being under tension.

== Indications ==
There are several uses of bone regeneration:

- Fenestration and dehiscence
- Building up bone around implants placed in tooth sockets after tooth extraction
- Socket preservation for future implantation of false teeth or prosthetics
- Sinus Lift Elevation prior to implant placement
- Filling of bone after removing the root of a tooth, cystectomy or the removal of impacted teeth
- Repairing bone defects surrounding a dental implant caused by peri-implantitis
- Vertical and horizontal augmentation of the upper and lower jaws
- Cystic cavity

== Contraindications ==
Contraindications include:

- Smoking
- Inadequate self-performed oral hygiene
- Many sites of bony and tissue defects
- Unable to achieve wound closure after surgery due to insufficient soft tissues
- Severe furcation involvement, i.e. grade 3
- Systemic diseases, e.g. diabetes

== Potential complications ==
Potential complications include:

- Unsuccessful treatment procedure which can lead to recurrent defect
- Post-treatment infection
- Barrier membrane being worn away, caused by e.g. traumatic toothbrushing
- Vitality of tooth being compromised in furcation-involved teeth
- Unfavourable gingival adaptation which can be of aesthetic concern
- Dentine hypersensitivity
- Requirement for long term professional maintenance

== See also ==
- Fibrin scaffold
- Hounsfield scale
- Platelet-rich plasma
- Platelet rich fibrin
