= List of listed buildings in Birse =

This is a list of listed buildings in the parish of Birse, Aberdeenshire, Scotland.

== List ==
Name	Location	Date Listed	Grid Ref. (Note: Sometimes known as OSGB36, the grid reference (where provided) is based on the British national grid reference system used by the Ordnance Survey. • "Guide to National Grid". Ordnance Survey. • "Get-a-map". Ordnance Survey.)	Geo-coordinates	Notes	LB Number (Note: Historic Environment Scotland assign a unique alphanumeric identifier to each designated site in Scotland, for listed buildings this always begins with "LB", for example "LB12345".)	Image
Finzean, Bucket Mill, Including Sawmill, Lade, Weir, Sluice Gate, Kiln, Stable And Cart House (Shop), And Cottage				57°05′19″N 2°42′05″W	Category A	3100	Upload Photo
Finzean, Sawmill And Turning Mill, Including Lade, Weir, Sluice Gate, Generator House, Kiln, Stack, Smiddy, Former Bus Garage, Mill Cottage, Ancillary Structures And Bridge Over Water Feugh				57°00′49″N 2°40′29″W	Category A	3046	Upload Photo
Ballogie Policies, Ice House				57°02′50″N 2°42′33″W	Category C(S)	3090	Upload Photo
Newmill Farmhouse, Including Kennels To South				57°03′08″N 2°45′31″W	Category C(S)	3096	Upload Photo
Birsemore, Cairnrobin, Including Boundary Walls And Ancillary Structure				57°04′05″N 2°47′01″W	Category C(S)	47104	Upload Photo
Finzean, Well To E Of Finzean Bucket Mill, In Memory Of Joseph Farquharson				57°00′40″N 2°41′38″W	Category C(S)	47109	Upload Photo
Ballogie Policies, Home Farm				57°02′56″N 2°42′13″W	Category C(S)	3091	Upload Photo
Midstrath Limekiln				57°02′49″N 2°40′52″W	Category B	3094	Upload Photo
Potarch Bridge, Over River Dee				57°03′55″N 2°38′55″W	Category A	3095	Upload Photo
Finzean Policies, South Lodge				57°01′17″N 2°39′44″W	Category C(S)	47112	Upload Photo
Finzean Policies, Walled Garden Including Ancillary Structure				57°01′47″N 2°40′28″W	Category C(S)	47113	Upload Photo
Milton				57°02′42″N 2°42′34″W	Category C(S)	47115	Upload Photo
Easter Clune House, Including Cheese Press And Boundary Wall Incorporating Remains Of Castle Of Easter Clune				57°00′47″N 2°38′25″W	Category B	3055	Upload Photo
Birsemore, Altdinnie, Including Cheese Press, Cast-Iron Gates And Gatepiers				57°03′57″N 2°47′25″W	Category C(S)	47102	Upload Photo
Birsemore, Birse Brae, Including Ancillary Structures And Boundary Walls				57°04′04″N 2°47′03″W	Category C(S)	47103	Upload Photo
Finzean Policies, Bridge Over Hollow Burn				57°01′38″N 2°40′31″W	Category C(S)	47110	Upload Photo
Ballogie Policies, Gamekeepers Bothy And Kennels				57°03′01″N 2°42′05″W	Category C(S)	47100	Upload Photo
Bridge Over Burn Of Cattie				57°03′06″N 2°40′08″W	Category C(S)	47106	Upload Photo
Milton, Bridge Over Burn Of Garbet				57°02′43″N 2°42′35″W	Category C(S)	47116	Upload Photo
Muir Croft, Including Ancillary Structure				57°03′20″N 2°41′58″W	Category C(S)	47118	Upload Photo
Forest Of Birse, Birse Castle Kennels				57°00′12″N 2°47′33″W	Category C(S)	3098	Upload Photo
Forest Of Birse Estate, Glencat House, Including Boundary Walls				57°01′43″N 2°45′30″W	Category C(S)	3099	Upload Photo
Mill Of Clinter, Cottage To South				57°01′03″N 2°38′28″W	Category C(S)	3054	Upload Photo
Birseside (Former Birse Manse), Including Walled Garden				57°03′53″N 2°44′09″W	Category C(S)	3085	Upload Photo
Allancreich Farmhouse, Including Cheese Press				57°03′33″N 2°42′26″W	Category C(S)	3093	Upload Photo
Balfour Gardens, Walled Garden				57°03′19″N 2°44′03″W	Category C(S)	47096	Upload Photo
Bridge Over Burn Of Birse, To S Of Birse And Feughside Parish Church				57°03′46″N 2°44′02″W	Category C(S)	47105	Upload Photo
Finzean, Haughend, Grain Kiln To N				57°00′48″N 2°40′21″W	Category C(S)	47108	Upload Photo
Forest Of Birse, Birse And Feughside Parish Church (Church Of Scotland)				57°00′13″N 2°46′14″W	Category C(S)	47114	Upload Photo
Birse War Memorial				57°02′06″N 2°40′06″W	Category C(S)	3052	Upload Photo
Tillyfruskie Farmhouse, Including Gates, Courtyard Wall, Boundary Walls, Ancillary Structure, Loupin'-On Stane And Cheese Press				57°01′32″N 2°37′25″W	Category B	3056	Upload Photo
Finzean Policies, Home Farm Steading				57°01′45″N 2°40′31″W	Category B	47111	Upload Photo
Muir Cottage				57°03′26″N 2°42′20″W	Category C(S)	47117	Upload Photo
Forest Of Birse, Birse Castle, Including Boundary Walls And Cheese Press				57°00′13″N 2°47′30″W	Category B	3097	Upload Photo
Bogieshiel Lodge				57°02′40″N 2°43′05″W	Category B	3087	Upload Photo
Ballogie Policies, Sundial				57°02′55″N 2°42′32″W	Category C(S)	3089	Upload Photo
Balfour Gardens, Steading				57°03′20″N 2°44′04″W	Category C(S)	47095	Upload Photo
Finzean, Birse & Feughside Parish Church At Finzean (Church Of Scotland)				57°01′19″N 2°39′06″W	Category C(S)	47107	Upload Photo
Mill Of Clinter, Including Weir, Lade, Secondary Wheel, Outfall Channel And Bridge				57°01′03″N 2°38′28″W	Category B	3053	Upload Photo
Birse And Feughside Parish Church, (Church Of Scotland), Including Churchyard Gates, Gatepiers And Boundary Walls				57°03′52″N 2°44′11″W	Category B	3084	Upload Photo
Balfour House, Including Gate And Gatepiers				57°03′17″N 2°44′10″W	Category B	3086	Upload Photo
Ballogie Policies, Sundial Within Walled Garden				57°03′05″N 2°42′13″W	Category B	3092	Upload Photo
Ballogie Policies, Walled Garden				57°03′04″N 2°42′14″W	Category B	47101	Upload Photo
Muir Croft, Souter's Shop				57°03′19″N 2°41′57″W	Category C(S)	47119	Upload Photo

== Key ==
The scheme for classifying buildings in Scotland is:

- Category A: "buildings of national or international importance, either architectural or historic; or fine, little-altered examples of some particular period, style or building type."
- Category B: "buildings of regional or more than local importance; or major examples of some particular period, style or building type, which may have been altered."
- Category C: "buildings of local importance; lesser examples of any period, style, or building type, as originally constructed or moderately altered; and simple traditional buildings which group well with other listed buildings."

In March 2016 there were 47,288 listed buildings in Scotland. Of these, 8% were Category A, and 50% were Category B, with the remaining 42% being Category C.

== See also ==
- List of listed buildings in Aberdeenshire
