= Biphasic calcium sulfate =

Chemical substance

Biphasic calcium sulfate is a granulated powder composed of calcium sulfate hydrate (CaSO_{4}•2H_{2}O) and calcium sulfate hemihydrate (CaSO_{4}•1/2H_{2}O). It is used primarily as a bone grafting material in dental augmentation procedures such as socket grafting, lateral augmentation, sinus lift, cyst enucleation and more.

The clinical use of calcium sulfate has been documented for over a century as a bone grafting material, and was first recorded in Germany in 1892 when it was used to fill bone defects in patients with tuberculous cavities. Calcium sulfate has not been widely available for dental uses due to its instability in the presence of blood and saliva. Studies have shown that it is a delivery vehicle for growth factors and that the calcium in calcium sulfate stimulates osteoblasts.

Biphasic calcium sulfate was invented in 2010 and has the same chemical structure as calcium sulfate. It is a biocompatible material that slowly dissolves as new bone is formed, over a period of 3 to 6 months. It is also used as a composite graft, for longer term use. The unique structure of biphasic calcium sulfate allows it to be moldable and stable in the presence of blood and saliva, making it effective for use in dental augmentation procedures. Biphasic calcium sulfate is well accepted by the body, and acts as a scaffold allowing for optimal bone growth as it slowly reabsorbs. Soft tissue is prevented from growing into the defect, but blood vessels are able to grow (angiogenesis), which brings osteogenic cells to the area.
