= Hilt Tatum =

American dentist (1934–2025)

Oscar Hilt Tatum, Jr. (April 22, 1934 – February 17, 2025) was an American dentist notable for being the first clinician to perform a sinus lift procedure.

== Education and career ==
Tatum graduated from the now defunct Emory University Dental School in 1957. He had several University faculty appointments in the US and for 25 years was on the faculty of The Lille University School of Medicine in France. He served as President of both the American Academy of Implant Dentistry and the American Board of Oral Implantology/Implant Dentistry. On June 16, 2003, he was awarded The French Legion of Honour by President Jacques Chirac in Paris, France. Following this, he established a training course in Birmingham, England where he trained multiple dentists on how to expand bone, place implants and graft sinuses. He continued to work into his eighth decade. Tatum died on February 17, 2025, at the age of 90.
