= Daniel Buser =

Swiss oral and maxillofacial surgeon

Daniel Buser is a Swiss oral and maxillofacial surgeon, academic, and researcher, known for his work in implant dentistry and guided bone regeneration (GBR). He is a professor emeritus of Oral Surgery at the University of Bern.

He is the recipient of Daniel M. Laskin Award from the American Association of Oral and Maxillofacial Surgeons and the Honorary Membership Award from the American Academy of Periodontology.

== Education and career ==
Buser spent the majority of his professional career at the University of Bern, where he was appointed Professor and Chairman of the Department of Oral Surgery in 2000. He held this position until 2019, after which he was named professor emeritus.

Between 1989 and 1991, Buser conducted research at Harvard University in the United States, where he was exposed to emerging concepts in implant dentistry and biomaterials. He held sabbatical appointments at the Baylor College of Dentistry in 1995 and the University of Melbourne from 2007 to 2008. He has also served as President of International Team for Implantology from 2009 to 2013.

Buser has also served as a Lecturer on Restorative Dentistry and Biomaterials Sciences at the Harvard School of Dental Medicine.

He received the André Schroeder Research Prize from the ITI in 1995, the Daniel M. Laskin Award from the American Association of Oral and Maxillofacial Surgeons in 1996, and the Honorary Membership Award from the American Academy of Periodontology in 1997.

He was also honored with the Brånemark Osseointegration Award by the Academy of Osseointegration in 2013 and received the ITI Honorary Fellowship in 2017.

== Research ==
Buser is known as an early developer of guided bone regeneration (GBR), having performed one of the earliest GBR procedures in October 1988 at the University of Bern. His research defined key biological principles underlying the method, including the use of barrier membranes, maintenance of regenerative space, and stabilization of the blood clot. He has also conducted anatomical research utilizing cone beam computed tomography (CBCT) to improve surgical planning and minimize complications.
