= SOSTDC1 =

Protein-coding gene in the species Homo sapiens

Identifiers
- Aliases: SOSTDC1, ECTODIN, USAG1, CDA019, DAND7, sclerostin domain containing 1
- External IDs: OMIM: 609675; MGI: 1913292; GeneCards: SOSTDC1

Gene location (Human)
Chr.	Chromosome 7 (human)
Band	7p21.2	Start	16,461,481 bp
Band	7p21.2	End	16,530,580 bp

Gene location (Mouse)
Chr.	Chromosome 12 (mouse)
Band	12|12 A3	Start	36,364,138 bp
Band	12|12 A3	End	36,368,451 bp
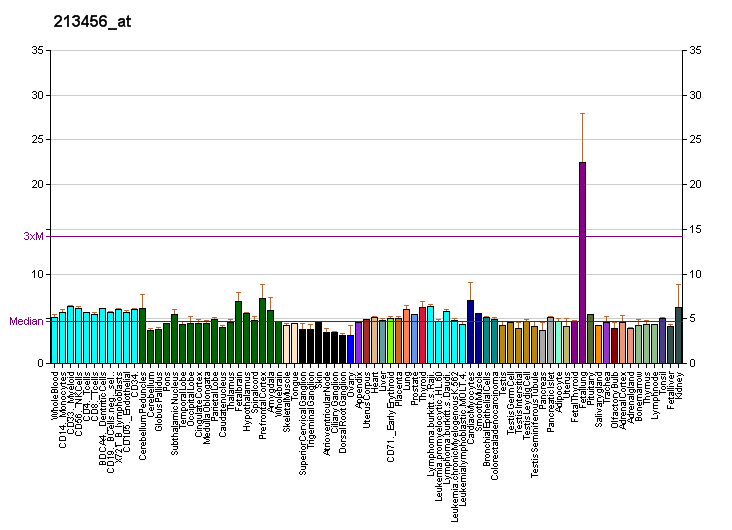
RNA expression pattern
Bgee	Human / Mouse (ortholog); Top expressed in: retinal pigment epithelium; hair follicle; Epithelium of choroid plexus; parotid gland; skin of thigh; skin of arm; lower lobe of lung; rectum; sperm; endothelial cell / Top expressed in: Epithelium of choroid plexus; molar; retinal pigment epithelium; lumbar spinal ganglion; sciatic nerve; lip; right kidney; lateral recess; human kidney; Gonadal ridge; More reference expression data
BioGPS	More reference expression data
Gene ontology
Molecular function	BMP binding; BMP receptor activity
Cellular component	extracellular region; extracellular space
Biological process	pattern specification process; odontogenesis of dentin-containing tooth; hair follicle morphogenesis; mammary gland bud morphogenesis; negative regulation of cell fate commitment; Wnt signaling pathway; negative regulation of canonical Wnt signaling pathway; negative regulation of Wnt signaling pathway; BMP signaling pathway; negative regulation of BMP signaling pathway; negative regulation of myoblast differentiation; negative regulation of determination of dorsal identity
Sources:Amigo / QuickGO
Orthologs
Databases	NCBI: entry; OMA: entry
Species	Human	Mouse
Entrez	25928	66042
Ensembl	ENSG00000171243	ENSMUSG00000036169
UniProt	Q6X4U4	Q9CQN4
RefSeq (mRNA)	NM_015464	NM_025312
RefSeq (protein)	NP_056279	NP_079588
Location (UCSC)	Chr 7: 16.46 – 16.53 Mb	Chr 12: 36.36 – 36.37 Mb
PubMed search
- Wikidata
View/Edit Human	View/Edit Mouse

Sclerostin domain-containing protein 1 is a protein that in humans is encoded by the SOSTDC1 gene.

== Function ==
This gene is a member of the sclerostin family and encodes Uterine sensitization-associated gene-1 (USAG-1), an N-glycosylated, secreted protein with a C-terminal, cystine, knot-like domain. This protein functions as a bone morphogenetic protein (BMP) antagonist. Specifically, it directly associates with BMPs, prohibiting them from binding their receptors, thereby regulating BMP signaling during cellular proliferation, differentiation, and programmed cell death.

Inhibition of USAG-1 is of interest as a potential means of stimulating tooth regeneration for dentistry.
