= Low-intensity pulsed ultrasound =

Low-intensity pulsed ultrasound (LIPUS) is a technology that can be used for therapeutic purposes. It exploits low intensity and pulsed mechanical waves in order to induce regenerative and anti-inflammatory effects on biological tissues, such as bone, cartilage, and tendon. Even if the real mechanism underlying its effectiveness has not been understood yet, it is plausible that the treatment relies on non-thermal phenomena, such as microbubbles and microjets induced by cavitation, acoustic streaming, and mechanical stimulation.

== Technique ==
LIPUS uses generally 1.5 MHz frequency pulses, with a pulse width of 200 μs, repeated at 1 kHz, at a spatial average and temporal average intensity of 30 mW/cm^{2}.

== Medical uses ==
Starting around the 1950s this technology was being used as a form of physical therapy for ailments such as tendinitis.

As of 2009 research for the use of LIPUS to treat soft tissue injuries were in the early stages. As of 2012 it was being studied for dental problems.

Low intensity pulsed ultrasound has been proposed as a therapy to support bone healing after fractures, osteomies, or delayed healing. A 2017 review, however, found no trustworthy evidence for the use of low intensity pulsed ultrasound for bone healing, mostly based on the large pragmatic randomized controlled trial published in 2016. An associated guideline issued a strong recommendation against its use in bone healing. Evidence as of 2023 was insufficient to justify its use to prevent non healing of bone fractures. Tentative evidence supports better healing with the use of the system in long bones that have not healed after three months. Some reviews suggested inconclusive evidence of benefit. One industry supported meta-analysis suggested it as a potential alternative to surgery for established nonunions. Most studies suggesting benefit were funded by manufacturers of ultrasound devices.

In 2018, a study published in the journal Brain Stimulation, reported that experiments on mice showed that whole-brain LIPUS therapy markedly improved cognitive dysfunctions without serious side effects by enhancing specific cells related to dementia's pathology. Clinical trials are underway.

In vitro experiments have confirmed the LIPUS capability to regulate cell proliferation and differentiation as well as the opening of cell membrane channels.

== See also ==
- Tooth regeneration
