= Carbon nanotubes in medicine =

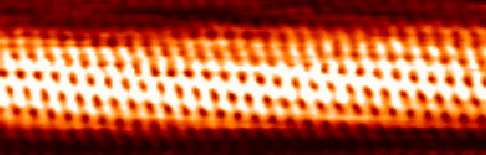
A scanning tunneling microscopy image of single-walled carbon nanotube.

Carbon nanotubes (CNTs) are very prevalent in today's world of medical research and are being highly researched in the fields of efficient drug delivery and biosensing methods for disease treatment and health monitoring. Carbon nanotube technology has shown to have the potential to alter drug delivery and biosensing methods for the better, and have recently garnered interest in the field of medicine.

The use of CNTs in drug delivery and biosensing technology has the potential to revolutionalize medicine. Functionalization of single-walled nanotubes (SWNTs) has proven to enhance solubility and allow for efficient tumor targeting/drug delivery. It prevents SWNTs from being cytotoxic and altering the function of immune cells.

Cancer, a group of diseases in which cells grow and divide abnormally, is one of the primary diseases being looked at with regards to how it responds to CNT drug delivery. Current cancer therapy primarily involves surgery, radiation therapy, and chemotherapy. These methods of treatment are usually painful and kill normal cells in addition to producing adverse side effects. CNTs as drug delivery vehicles have shown potential in targeting specific cancer cells with a dosage lower than conventional drugs used, that is just as effective in killing the cells, however does not harm healthy cells and significantly reduces side effects. Current blood glucose monitoring methods by patients with diabetes are normally invasive and often painful. For example, one method involves a continuous glucose sensor integrated into a small needle which must be inserted under the skin to monitor glucose levels every few days. Another method involves glucose monitoring strips to which blood must be applied. These methods are not only invasive but they can also yield inaccurate results. It was shown that 70 percent of glucose readings obtained by continuous glucose sensors differed by 10 percent or more and 7 percent differed by over 50 percent. The high electrochemically accessible surface area, high electrical conductivity and useful structural properties have demonstrated the potential use of single-walled nanotubes (SWNTs) and multi-walled nanotubes (MWNTs) in highly sensitive noninvasive glucose detectors.

== CNT properties ==
CNTs have several unique chemical, size, optical, electrical and structural properties that make them attractive as drug delivery and biosensing platforms for the treatment of various diseases and the noninvasive monitoring of blood levels and other chemical properties of the human body, respectively.

=== Electrical and structural ===
Carbon nanotubes can be metallic or semiconducting depending on their structure. This is due to the symmetry and unique electronic structure of graphene. For a given (n,m) nanotube, if n = m, the nanotube is metallic; if n − m is a multiple of 3, then the nanotube is semiconducting with a very small band gap, otherwise the nanotube is a moderate semiconductor. Thus all armchair (n=m) nanotubes are metallic, and nanotubes (5,0), (6,4), (9,1), etc. are semiconducting. Thus, some nanotubes have conductivities higher than that of copper, while others behave more like silicon.

=== Dimensional ===
Due to their nanoscale dimensions, electron transport in carbon nanotubes will take place through quantum effects and will only propagate along the axis of the tube. These electrical and structural properties best serve CNTs as far as biosensing is concerned because current changes in the CNTs can signify specific biological entities they are designed to detect. The fact that CNTs are small (nm scale) allows them to deliver smaller doses of drugs to specific disease cells in the body thus reducing side effects and harm to healthy cells unlike conventional drugs, whilst improving disease cell targeting efficiency.

=== Chemical ===
CNTs have been observed to have enhanced solubility when functionalized with lipids which would make their movement through the human body easier and would also reduce the risk of blockage of vital body organ pathways. As far as optical properties are concerned CNTs have been shown to exhibit strong optical absorbance in certain spectral windows such as NIR (near-infrared) light and when functionalized with tumor cell specific binding entities have allowed the selective destruction of disease (e.g. cancer) cells with NIR in drug delivery applications. They have good chemical properties.

== CNTs in drug delivery and cancer therapy ==
Drug delivery is a rapidly growing area that is now taking advantage of nanotube technology. Systems being used currently for drug delivery include dendrimers, polymers, and liposomes, but carbon nanotubes present the opportunity to work with effective structures that have high drug loading capacities and good cell penetration qualities. These nanotubes function with a larger inner volume to be used as the drug container, large aspect ratios for numerous functionalization attachments, and the ability to be readily taken up by the cell. Because of their tube structure, carbon nanotubes can be made with or without end caps, meaning that without end caps the inside where the drug is held would be more accessible. Right now with carbon nanotube drug delivery systems, problems arise like the lack of solubility, clumping occurrences, and half-life. However, these are all issues that are currently being addressed and altered for further advancements in the carbon nanotube field. The advantages of carbon nanotubes as nanovectors for drug delivery remain where cell uptake of these structures was demonstrated efficiently where the effects were prominent, showing the particular nanotubes can be less harmful as nanovehicles for drugs. Also, drug encapsulation has been shown to enhance water dispersibility, better bioavailability, and reduced toxicity. Encapsulation of molecules also provides a material storage application as well as protection and controlled release of loaded molecules. All of these result in a good drug delivery basis where further research and understanding could improve upon numerous other advancements, like increased water solubility, decreased toxicity, sustained half-life, increased cell penetration and uptake, all of which are currently novel but undeveloped ideas.

=== Boron neutron capture therapy ===
Narayan Hosmane and his co-workers have recently developed a new approach to Boron Neutron Capture Therapy in the treatment of cancer using substituted Carborane-Appended Water-Soluble single-wall carbon nanotubes. Substituted C2B10 carborane cages were successfully attached to the side walls of single wall carbon nanotubes (SWCNTs) via nitrene cycloaddition. The decapitations of these C2B10 carborane cages, with the appended SWCNTs intact, were accomplished by the reaction with sodium hydroxide in refluxing ethanol. During base reflux, the three-membered ring formed by the nitrene and SWCNT was opened to produce water-soluble SWCNTs in which the side walls were functionalized by both substituted nido-C2B9 carborane units and ethoxide moieties. All new compounds were characterized by EA, SEM, TEM, UV, NMR, and IR spectra and chemical analyses. Selected tissue distribution studies on one of these nanotubes, {([Na+][1-Me-2-((CH2)4NH-)-1,2-C2B9H10][OEt])n(SWCNT)} (Va), showed that the boron atoms are concentrated more in tumors cells than in blood and other organs, making it an attractive nanovehicle for the delivery of boron to tumor cells for an effective boron neutron capture therapy in the treatment of cancer.

=== Selective cancer cell destruction ===
Carbon nanotubes can be used as multifunctional biological transporters and near-infrared agents for selective cancer cell destruction. Biological systems are known to be highly transparent to 700- to 1,100-nm near-infrared (NIR) light. Researchers showed that the strong optical absorbance of single-walled carbon nanotubes (SWNTs) in this special spectral window, an intrinsic property of SWNTs, can be used for optical stimulation of nanotubes inside living cells to afford multifunctional nanotube biological transporters. They used oligonucleotides transported inside living Hela cells by nanotubes. The oligonucleotides translocated into the cell nucleus upon endosomal rupture triggered by NIR laser pulses. Continuous NIR radiation caused cell death because of excessive local heating of SWNT in vitro. Selective cancer cell destruction was achieved by functionalization of SWNT with a folate moiety, selective internalization of SWNTs inside cells labeled with folate receptor tumor markers, and NIR-triggered cell death, without harming receptor-free normal cells. Thus, the transporting capabilities of carbon nanotubes combined with suitable functionalization chemistry and their intrinsic optical properties can lead to new classes of novel nanomaterials for drug delivery and cancer therapy.

=== Tumor targeting ===
Research has been conducted on in vivo biodistribution and highly efficient tumor targeting of carbon nanotubes in mice for cancer therapy. Investigations are being done on the biodistribution of radio-labelled SWNTs in mice by in vivo positron emission tomography (PET), ex vivo biodistribution and Raman spectroscopy. It was found that SWNTs that are functionalized with phospholipids bearing polyethylene glycol (PEG) are surprisingly stable in vivo. The effect of PEG chain length on the biodistribution and circulation of the SWNTs was studied. Effectively PEGylated SWNTs exhibited relatively long blood circulation times and low uptake by the reticuloendothelial system (RES). Efficient targeting of integrin positive tumor in mice was achieved with SWNTs coated with PEG chains linked to an arginine–glycine–aspartic acid (RGD) peptide. A high tumor accumulation was attributed to the multivalent effect of the SWNTs. The Raman signatures of SWNTs were used to directly probe the presence of nanotubes in mice tissues and confirm the radio-label-based results.

== CNTs as biosensors ==
=== CNT network bio-stress sensors ===
A single nanotube experiences a change in electrical resistance when experiencing stress or strain. This piezoresistive effect changes the current flow through the nanotube, which can be measured in order to accurately quantify the applied stress. A semi-random positioning of many overlapping nanotubes forms an electrically conducting network composed of many piezoresistive nanotubes. If the variance of the tube lengths and angles are known and controllable during manufacture, an eigensystem approach can be used to determine the expected current flow between any two points in the network. The tube network is embedded within orthopedic plates, clamps, and screws and in bone grafts in order to determine the state of bone healing by measuring the effect of a load on the plate, clamp, screw, or other fixation device attached to the bone. A healed bone will bear most of the load while a yet unhealed bone will defer the load to the fixation device wherein the nanotube network may measure the change in resistivity. Measurement is done wirelessly by electrical induction. This allows the doctor to accurately assess patient healing and also allows the patient to know how much stress the affected area may safely tolerate. Wolff's law indicates that bone responds positively to safe amounts of stress, which may be necessary for proper healing.

=== Glucose detection biosensors ===
Carbon nanotube–plasma polymer-based amperometric biosensors for ultrasensitive glucose detection have been fabricated. Two amperometric enzyme biosensors were fabricated. One had single wall nanotubes and the other multi wall nanotubes, however, plasma-polymerized thin films (PPFs) were incorporated into both. A mixture of the enzyme glucose oxidase (GOD) and a CNT film was sandwiched with 10-nm-thick acetonitrile PPFs. A PPF layer was deposited onto a sputtered gold electrode. In order to facilitate the electrochemical communication between the CNT layer and GOD, CNTs were treated with oxygen plasma. The device with single-walled CNTs showed a sensitivity higher than that of multi walled CNTs. The glucose biosensor showed ultrasensitivity (a sensitivity of 40 μA mM-1 cm-2, a correlation coefficient of 0.992, a linear response range of 0.025 –1.9 mM, a detection limit of 6.2 μM at S/N = 3, +0.8V vs Ag/AgCl), and a rapid response (<4 seconds in reaching 95% of maximum response). This high performance is attributed to the fact that CNTs have excellent electrocatalytic activity and enhance electron transfer, and that PPFs and/or the plasma process for CNTs are an enzyme-friendly platform, i.e., a suitable design of the interface between GOD and CNTs.

=== DNA detection biosensors ===
An aligned carbon nanotube ultrasensitive biosensor for DNA detection was developed. The design and fabrication of the biosensor was based on aligned single wall carbon nanotubes (SWCNTs) with integrated single-strand DNAs (ssDNA). The fabricated ultra-sensitive biosensor provided label-free real-time electronic detection of DNA hybridization between surface immobilized ssDNA and target ssDNA. Hybridization kinetics between complementary and target ssDNA nucleotide base pairs resulted in a local charge generation between base pairs that was injected into the SWCNTs resulting in a detectable change in SWCNT electrical conductance. This conductance change was amplified electrically through the integration of the functionalized SWCNTs as the semi-conductive channel in a silicon-silicon oxide based field effect transistor (FET). Based on previous Langmuir DNA kinetics calculations, the projected sensitivity level of the SWCNT-DNA sensor was considerably higher than traditional fluorescent and hybridization assays.

=== CNT modified electrode biosensors ===
A microbial biosensor based on carbon nanotube (CNT) modified electrodes was developed. Pseudomonas putida DSM 50026 cells were used as the biological component and the measurement was based on the respiratory activity of the cells estimated from electrochemical measurements. The cells were immobilized on carbon nanotube (CNT) modified carbon paste electrodes (CPE) by means of a redox osmium polymer. The osmium polymer efficiently shuttled electrons between redox enzymes located in the cell wall of the cells and promoted a stable binding to the electrode surface. The effect of varying the amounts of CNT and osmium polymer, on the response to glucose was investigated to find the optimum composition of the sensor. The effects of pH and temperature were also examined. After the optimisation studies, the system was characterised by using glucose as a substrate. Moreover, the microbial biosensor was also prepared by using phenol adapted bacteria and then, calibrated to phenol. After that, it was applied for phenol detection in an artificial waste water sample. The study found that whole cell P. putida biosensors using Os-redox polymers could be good alternatives for the analysis of different substrates such as glucose as well as xenobiotics in the absence of oxygen with high sensitivity because of the fast electron collection efficiency between the Os-redox polymer and the bacterial cells. The use of optimum amounts of CNTs and the Os redox mediator provided better sensor sensitivity by promoting the electron transfer within the structure of the biosensor. The main disadvantages were the high surface area of CNTs that increased the background current and the diffusion problem of electrons that occurred due to overlapping of the diffusion layers formed at closely spaced CNTs in the film. However, these problems could be overcome by optimising the CNT and polymer amounts.

== Toxicity issues ==
=== Cytotoxity of functionalized CNTs ===
Research shows that functionalized carbon nanotubes are non-cytotoxic and preserve the functionality of primary immune cells. Two types of f-CNTs were prepared, following the 1,3-dipolar cycloaddition reaction (f-CNTs 1 and 2) and the oxidation/amidation treatment (f-CNTs 3 and 4), respectively. Both types of f-CNTs were uptaken by B and T lymphocytes as well as macrophages in vitro, without affecting cell viability. Subsequently, the functionality of the different cells was analyzed carefully. It was discovered that f-CNT 1, which is highly water-soluble, did not influence the functional activity of immunoregulatory cells. f-CNT 3, which instead possesses reduced solubility and forms mainly stable water suspensions, preserved lymphocytes' functionality while provoking secretion of proinflammatory cytokines by macrophages. One important thing to note from this study is the fact that certain types of CNTs functionalized with lipids are highly water-soluble which would make their movement through the human body easier and would also reduce the risk of blockage of vital body organ pathways thus making them more attractive as drug delivery vehicles.

=== In vitro cytotoxicity ===
In vitro toxicity of single- and multi-walled carbon nanotubes in human astrocytoma and lung carcinoma cells was investigated. The study was undertaken to characterize the physicochemical properties of single-walled nanotubes (SWNTs), multi-walled nanotubes (MWNTs) and functionalized MW (MW-COOH and MW-NH_{2}), and to assess their cytotoxicity in human astrocytoma D384-cells and lung carcinoma A549-cells, using the MTT assay and calcein/propidium iodide (PI) staining. Both the as-received and the modified nanotubes were characterized by means of thermal analysis (TGA), infrared spectroscopy and atomic force microscopy chiefly to check the degree of functionalization. The cells were exposed to the nanomaterials (0.1–100 μg/ml) for 24, 48 and 72 hours in a medium containing 10% FCS. In D384 cells MTT results revealed a strong cytotoxicity (50%) of SWNTs after 24‑hour exposure already at 0.1 μg/ml, without further changes at higher concentrations or longer incubation times. At all time-points MTT metabolism was decreased by 50% by all the other compounds at 10 μg/ml and with no exacerbation at the higher dose. Similar results were obtained with A549 cells. Experiments using calcein/PI staining did not confirm MTT cytotoxicity data neither in D384- nor in A549-cells. The viability of these cells was not affected by any nanotube at any concentration or time of exposure, with the exception of the positive control SiO_{2}. The results suggested the need of a careful examination of carbon nanotubes toxic effects by means of multiple tests to circumvent the possible problem of artifactual results due to the interference of nanomaterials with the dye markers employed.

=== Cytotoxicity of SWNTs and MWCNTs ===
Multi-walled carbon nanotubes have been investigated in several species for their potential to promote mutagenesis. Studies in spinach, mice, various human cell lines, and rats have shown that MWCNT exposure is associated with oxidative damage, increased apoptosis, chromosome damage, and necrosis. A study in mice found that biomarkers for lung cancer were specifically affected by MWCNT exposure; these biomarkers are being researched as a method for monitoring occupational exposure to carbon nanotubes.

The cytotoxicity was investigated on healthy alveolar macrophage cells obtained from adult guinea pigs for single-wall nanotubes (SWNTs), multi-wall nanotubes (with diameters ranging from 10 to 20 nm, MWNT10), and fullerene (C60) for comparison purposes. Profound cytotoxicity of SWNTs was observed in alveolar macrophage (AM) after a 6-hour exposure in vitro. The cytotoxicity increased by as high as ~35% when the dosage of SWNTs was increased by 11.30 μg/cm2. No significant toxicity was observed for C60 up to a dose of 226.00 μg/cm2. The cytotoxicity apparently followed a sequence order on a mass basis: SWNTs > MWNT10 > quartz > C60. SWNTs significantly impaired phagocytosis of AM at the low dose of 0.38 μg/cm2, whereas MWNT10 and C60 induced injury only at the high dose of 3.06 μg/cm2. The macrophages exposed to SWNTs or MWNT10 of 3.06 μg/cm2 showed characteristic features of necrosis and degeneration. A sign of apoptotic cell death likely existed. It was concluded from the study that carbon nanomaterials with different geometric structures exhibit quite different cytotoxicity and bioactivity in vitro, although they may not be accurately reflected in the comparative toxicity in vivo.
