= Tooth regeneration =

Bioengineering technique to regenerate teeth

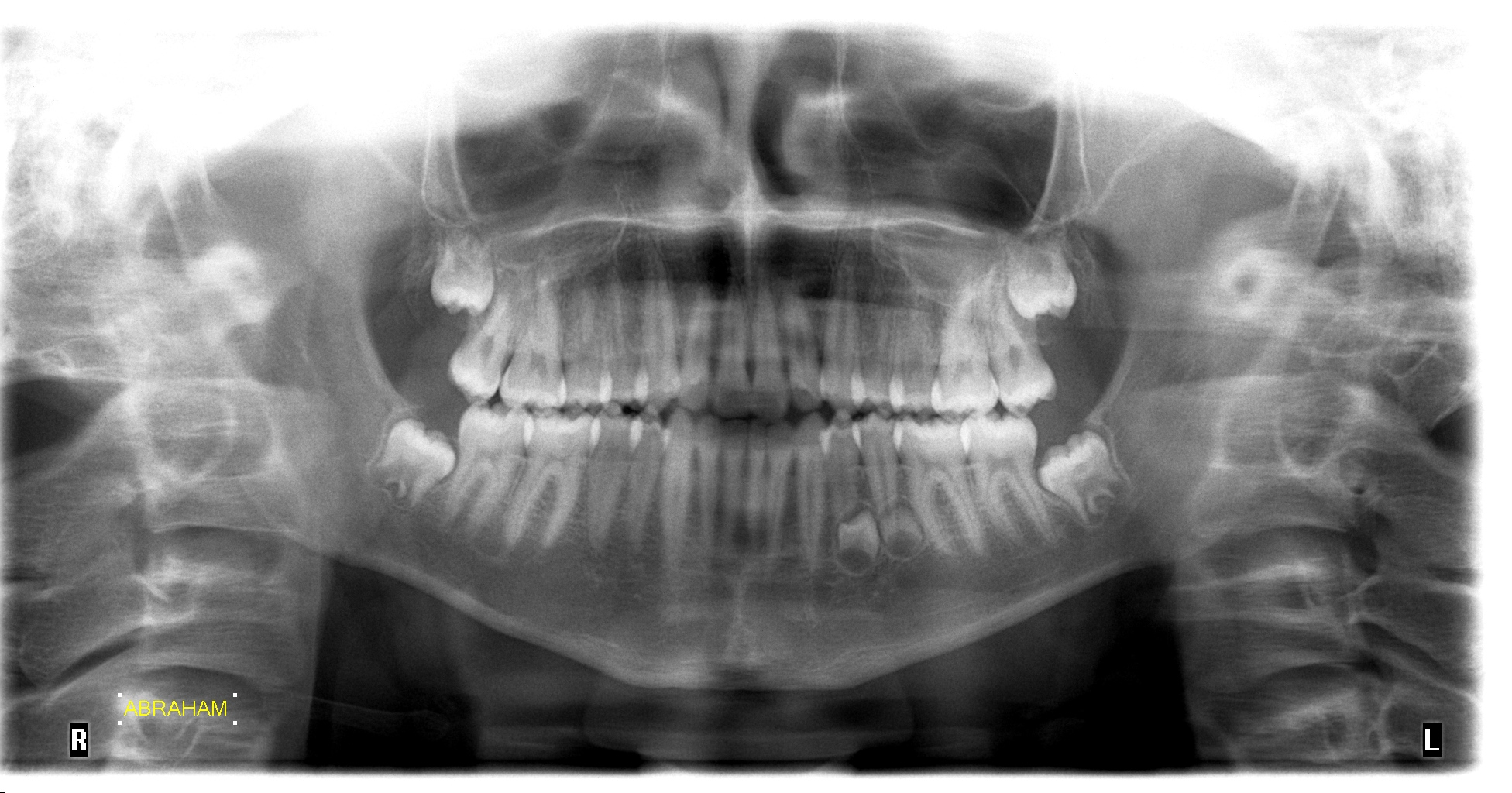
A set of human teeth under an orthopantomogram

Tooth regeneration is an emerging approach in regenerative medicine that aims to replace missing or damaged teeth through the bioengineering of new dental tissues using autologous stem cells. In this process, somatic cells are reprogrammed into induced pluripotent stem cells, which possess embryonic-like pluripotency and can differentiate into multiple cell lineages. These cells can subsequently be directed toward odontogenic differentiation and seeded either within the native tooth-forming region (dental lamina) or onto a resorbable biopolymer scaffold designed to mimic tooth architecture.

This approach represents a paradigm shift from conventional restorative dentistry, which relies on artificial replacements such as fillings, dentures, and implants, toward biologically based regeneration of functional tooth structures. Experimental models, particularly rodents such as mice and rats, have been extensively used to study tooth development due to their continuously growing incisors, which provide valuable insight into epithelial–mesenchymal interactions and stem cell maintenance during odontogenesis.

The clinical significance of tooth regeneration lies in the limitations of current treatment modalities for tooth loss, which primarily restore structure rather than biological function. Although conventional prosthetic and implant-based therapies are effective, they do not replicate the regenerative capacity or native physiology of natural teeth. Tooth loss remains highly prevalent globally, affecting a substantial proportion of adults, particularly older populations. While no clinically available therapy currently enables complete human tooth regeneration, advances in stem cell biology, including embryonic stem cells, induced pluripotent stem cells, RNA-based technologies, and biomineralisation strategies, indicate growing potential for future clinical translation.

== Clinical need ==
Tooth loss remains a significant clinical problem because current dental treatments are unable to fully restore the natural structure and biological function of teeth. Although restorative materials, dentures, and osseointegrated dental implants can replace missing teeth and improve oral function, they rely on inert materials and do not replicate the complex biology of natural teeth, particularly the presence of the periodontal ligament. The absence of the periodontal ligament eliminates its physiological role in shock absorption and force distribution during mastication, which may contribute to alveolar bone resorption over time. Given the high prevalence of tooth loss caused primarily by dental caries, periodontal disease, and genetic conditions, with dental caries being the most common disease worldwide, there is a clear need for alternative approaches that go beyond conventional restoration.

Natural teeth are composed of multiple specialized hard and soft tissues, including enamel, dentin, cementum, pulp, and the periodontal ligament, each of which plays a distinct biological role. Current dental therapies can restore external form but cannot replace the biological functions of these tissues, such as vascularization, innervation, and physiological remodeling. To overcome these limitations, research in regenerative dentistry focuses on understanding the mechanisms of tooth development, particularly the interactions between dental epithelium and dental mesenchyme that guide tissue formation. Knowledge of these developmental processes supports the design of biologically based strategies for regenerating dental tissues and potentially whole teeth, while also providing a valuable model for broader studies in organ development and regenerative medicine.

== Basic biology of tooth development ==
Tooth development, known as odontogenesis, occurs in several stages and applies to both deciduous and permanent teeth. Although permanent teeth develop later and replace primary teeth, both follow the same basic process. Development begins before birth with the bud stage, when dental epithelium grows from the dental lamina to form the tooth germ. This progresses to the cap stage, where the tooth germ differentiates into three main components: the enamel organ, the dental papilla, and the dental follicle. These structures establish the basic organization of the developing tooth.

In the bell stage, the enamel organ takes on a bell shape, tooth shape is determined, and cells specialize to carry out specific functions in enamel formation. This is followed by crown and root formation, during which dentin forms first, followed by enamel, while the root develops with the guidance of Hertwig's epithelial root sheath. Finally, in the eruption stage, the tooth moves toward the oral cavity as bone and connective tissues remodel to allow eruption. Primary teeth erupt first, usually beginning around six months of age, while permanent teeth develop later and erupt over several years, with some, such as third molars, completing development much later in life.

== Sources of stem cells for tooth regeneration ==
Tooth regeneration research relies on several major types of stem cells, each offering unique advantages and limitations:

1. Embryonic stem cells
  - These are pluripotent cells, meaning they can make any type of cell in the body.
  - They are derived from cells found in very early human embryos, before they have implanted in the uterus.
  - They grow indefinitely in the lab and have been shown to form tissues like gum lining, jawbone, and periodontal structures, and can even activate early tooth-forming genes.
  - However, the use of embryonic stem cells face serious challenges, including ethical concerns, possible immune rejection, and the risk of forming tumors, which currently prevent their clinical use in patients.
2. Adult stem cells found naturally in dental tissues
  - Several types of dental-derived stem cells have been identified, including:
    - Dental pulp stem cells from permanent teeth
    - Stem cells from human exfoliated deciduous teeth
    - Stem cells from the apical papilla
    - Dental follicle stem cells
    - Epithelial rests of Malassez
  - These stem cells can produce dentin, pulp-like tissues, bone, ligament, and, under experimental conditions, even enamel-like structures.
3. Adult stem cells from non-dental tissues
  - Mesenchymal stem cells, particularly from bone marrow, can respond to odontogenic signals from dental epithelium.
  - They have been shown to express tooth-related genes (e.g., Pax9, Msx1, Lhx7) and form tooth crown-like structures in animal models.
  - This shows that tooth development can be triggered even in cells from outside the mouth.
4. Induced pluripotent stem cells
  - They are created by reprogramming normal body cells back into a pluripotent state.
  - This technology, first developed by Yamanaka in 2006, allows scientists to produce cells similar to embryonic stem cells without using embryos.
  - In dentistry, induced pluripotent stem cells can be generated from many accessible tissues such as dental pulp, baby teeth, gum tissue, and periodontal ligaments.
  - Induced pluripotent stem cells share the same powerful abilities as embryonic stem cells in which they can become nearly any cell type and grow long-term, but without the ethical concerns.
  - They still carry risks like tumor formation and may retain "memory" from the original tissue, but they remain one of the most promising sources for creating fully functional, patient-specific bioengineered teeth in the future.

== Approaches to tooth regeneration ==
A few approaches are going on for tooth regeneration, including:

1. Clinical or Near-Clinical Approaches
  - USAG-1 antibody therapy: Blocks USAG-1 to activate natural tooth growth; currently in early human trials.
  - Dentin–pulp regeneration / Human exfoliated deciduous teeth stem cell: Uses dental stem cells with scaffolds and growth factors to restore dentin, pulp, blood vessels, and nerves in damaged teeth.
2. Experimental / Preclinical Approaches
  - Bioengineered tooth-germ transplantation: Lab-grown early tooth structures transplanted into the jaw form complete teeth in animals.
  - Signaling pathway modulation: Adjusts signaling pathways to stimulate tooth formation.
  - Tissue engineering: Use stem cells with or without biodegradable scaffolds to guide forming new teeth.
  - Component-specific regeneration: Focuses on regenerating individual tooth tissues such as enamel, dentin, or periodontal ligament.

== Animal studies ==
- Studies in animals have demonstrated the feasibility of whole-tooth bioengineering and targeted molecular modulation in tooth regeneration.
- Organ-germ reconstitution experiments showed that recombining epithelial and mesenchymal cells can generate structurally correct tooth germs capable of vascularization and innervation after transplantation in mice.
- Bioengineered tooth germs have been shown to erupt and functionally integrate into adult jaws, restoring periodontal ligament (PDL) attachment, neural responses, and masticatory function.
- Large-animal studies in canine models demonstrated that autologous postnatal cells can bioengineer teeth that erupt and function under physiological load, supporting potential clinical translation.
- Molecular pathways regulating tooth development and repair include the Wnt/β-catenin, BMP, and FGF signaling networks.
- Activation of Wnt signaling enhances dentin and pulp regeneration, promotes odontoblast differentiation, and increases tooth-replacement rates in teleost fish models.
- BMP signaling can restrict tooth replacement in certain developmental contexts.
- Systematic reviews support Wnt activation in animal models of dentin and pulp regeneration, though delivery methods and dosing remain challenges.
- Organoid and single-cell reaggregation approaches have reproduced aspects of tooth morphogenesis but face limitations, particularly in generating enamel-forming ameloblasts from adult epithelial sources.
- Clinical studies in humans have shown that autologous dental pulp stem cells can regenerate pulp-like tissue with vasculature, innervation, and new dentin formation in pulpectomized adult teeth.
- Early-phase studies combining dental pulp stem cells with growth factors have reported recovery of pulp vitality, although treatment protocols vary.
- In 2024, a first-in-human Phase I trial of the anti-USAG-1 biologic TRG-035 began safety testing to stimulate new tooth formation.
- Dental pulp stem cells have also been used clinically for periodontal and alveolar bone regeneration with favorable safety profiles.
- Biomimetic enamel-repair materials have shown promising preclinical results but have not yet progressed to large-scale human trials.

== Human studies ==
Recent early-stage human studies have explored whether stem-cell-based therapies can regenerate tissues inside damaged teeth. A pilot clinical study in Japan tested the safety of transplanting a patient's own dental-pulp stem cells into teeth that had undergone root-canal-like procedures. The transplanted cells produced new pulp-like tissue containing blood vessels, nerve fibers, and dentin-forming cells. Although the trial was small and focused mainly on safety and feasibility, the results provided early evidence that living tissue inside a mature tooth can potentially be restored.

=== Dental applications ===
Alongside this, several small clinical case reports and translational studies have examined "combined" regeneration strategies that use stem cells together with growth factors or scaffolds. These approaches have shown signs of restored tooth vitality, such as the return of some sensation and imaging evidence of new dentin formation. However, the procedures and materials vary widely between studies, and larger, controlled clinical trials are still needed to determine how effective and reliable these methods are. Related research using dental pulp stem cells has also reached early clinical use for regenerating nearby structures such as alveolar bone and periodontal tissues, where early evidence suggests improved bone healing and a favorable safety profile.

=== USAG-1 Tooth Regeneration Research ===
In 2024, a separate line of research entered first-in-human testing: a drug designed to stimulate the biological pathways involved in tooth development. This medication works by blocking a protein called USAG-1, which acts as a brake on tooth formation, and previously caused the growth of new teeth in animal models. Phase-1 human trials began in 2024 to evaluate the drug's safety in adult volunteers. As of now, no peer-reviewed clinical results have been published, and the treatment remains experimental. If shown to be safe and effective, it could represent the first medication aimed at inducing entirely new tooth formation in humans.

=== Enamel Regeneration ===
Beyond pulp and whole-tooth regeneration, researchers are also investigating ways to restore or rebuild tooth enamel. The mineralized outer layer does not naturally regenerate. Several biomimetic materials, such as protein-based matrices, mineralizing solutions, and peptide gels, have demonstrated the ability to create enamel-like mineral layers in laboratory and animal studies. These technologies aim to repair weakened or partially demineralized enamel. While promising, they have not yet been validated in large human trials, and questions remain about long-term durability, wear resistance, and performance in the oral environment.

== Clinical Challenges & Limitations ==
Although early human studies suggest that tooth regeneration may be biologically feasible, significant clinical and technical challenges remain before these approaches can be widely adopted in dental practice. As a result, regenerative therapies remain experimental, and conventional treatments such as fillings, crowns, root canals, and implants continue to be the standard of care.

- Mostly experimental: Stem cell–based tooth regeneration remains largely preclinical, with most studies limited to animal models and very few human trials.
- Uncertain reproducibility: Some techniques show inconsistent outcomes due to incomplete biological understanding.
- Long development time: Natural tooth development takes several years, making regeneration impractical for quick treatment.
- Complex tooth morphology: Reproducing the correct size, shape, and structure for different tooth types remains challenging.
- Limited control of differentiation: Reliable procedures to direct stem cells into specific dental tissues such as enamel, dentin, or pulp, are still lacking.
- Incomplete biological understanding: Key mechanisms controlling stem cells and tooth development are not yet fully understood.

== Social, Ethical, and Regulatory Issues ==
Beyond these scientific and clinical challenges, the development of tooth regeneration technologies also raises important ethical, social, and regulatory considerations.

=== Ethical Issues ===
- Socioeconomic disparities: Tooth regeneration may initially be accessible only to individuals with high financial means or access to advanced dental care. This could worsen existing oral health and socioeconomic disparities.
- Pediatric stem cell harvesting: The use of stem cells from children's baby teeth raises concerns regarding parental consent (ensuring parents understand procedures and implications) as well as the ownership and long-term storage of biological material.
- Long-term safety: The long-term safety of regenerated teeth remains uncertain. Potential risks such as unwanted tissue formation, tumorigenesis, and immune-related complications remain unresolved.

=== Social Issues ===
Public attitudes toward stem-cell and bioengineered treatments vary significantly:

- Some individuals view tooth regeneration as more natural than dental implants, while others express skepticism or fear due to misconceptions about lab-grown tissues.
- Restricted stem cell sources, advanced technologies, high costs, and slow insurance coverage may severely limit accessibility.
- Early adoption will likely be shaped by affordability and public trust.

=== Regulatory Issues ===
Regulatory agencies (such as the FDA and EMA) must strictly evaluate the safety, effectiveness, and manufacturing quality of these therapies. Approval requires rigorous clinical trials demonstrating long-term safety and consistent functional outcomes. Furthermore, unregulated stem-cell clinics may promote unproven tooth-regrowth claims, which endangers patients and undermines public trust in legitimate research.

== Future Directions in Tooth Regeneration ==
- Next-generation stem cell approaches: Research focuses on induced pluripotent stem cells (iPSCs) and dental pulp stem cells (DPSCs) to improve treatment reliability, reduce immune rejection, and enable personalized, patient-specific tooth regeneration.
- Bioengineered tooth germs: Laboratory-grown "tooth buds" are designed to mimic natural tooth development and have successfully formed functional teeth in animal studies, suggesting potential for natural eruption in humans. Advances in bioinks and stem-cell compatibility allow printing of pulp–dentin complexes, biomimetic scaffolds, and potentially entire tooth structures with precise anatomical control.
- Functional integration: Successful regeneration requires strong integration with the jawbone, periodontal ligament, blood vessels, and nerves so regenerated teeth achieve natural strength, stability, and sensory function.
- Enamel and hard-tissue regeneration: Researchers are exploring enamel organoids, ameloblast-like cells, and biomimetic materials to regenerate enamel, which does not naturally repair itself.
- Long-term vision: The ultimate aim is to grow fully functional, patient-specific biological teeth that restore natural structure and function, providing a superior alternative to conventional dental implants.

== See also ==
- Anodontia
- Epithelial cell rests of Malassez
- Polyphyodont
- Regenerative endodontics
- Socket preservation
- Tooth development
- Low-intensity pulsed ultrasound
