= Barrier membrane =

A barrier membrane is a device used in oral surgery and periodontal surgery to prevent epithelium, which regenerates relatively quickly, from growing into an area in which another, more slowly growing tissue type, such as bone, is desired. Such a method of preventing epithelial migration into a specific area is known as guided tissue regeneration (GTR).

== Origins ==
The first membranes developed were nonresorbable and required a second surgery for membrane removal some weeks later. The need for a second surgical procedure hindered the utilization of the original barrier membranes, which led to the development of resorbable membranes; research indicates no statistically significant difference in surgical success between the two types.

== Purpose ==
The purpose of a membrane is to prohibit the penetration of cells, primarily epithelial, through its structure. The bone tissue grows slower than soft tissue. Hence, if a bone defect needs to heal, the membrane separates it from the soft tissue, giving time for the bone cells to fill the defect. In absence of a barrier membrane, the defect would be occupied by soft tissue cells.

== Clinical considerations ==
When barrier membranes are utilized, the superficial soft tissue flap remains separated from the underlying bone for the primary healing period and must survive on the vascular supply of the flap; it cannot rely on granulation tissue derived from the underlying bone.

Two types of bony defects exist that may require the use of a membrane:

1. Space-making defect
2. Non-space-making defect

Space-making defects, such as extraction sockets with intact bony walls, are not as demanding as non-space-making defects, such as sites of ridge augmentation, where there may be no support for the membrane and the soft tissue cover may cause collapse of the membrane during healing.

== Types ==
Barrier membranes have been derived from a variety of sources, both natural and synthetic, and are marketed under various trade names. Membranes used in guided bone regeneration (GBR) and grafting may be of two principal varieties:

1. non-resorbable
2. resorbable.

=== Non-resorbable ===
Historically, GBR and grafting techniques began with impractical millipore (paper) filter barriers. Expanded polytetrafluoroethylene (ePTFE) membranes were first used by 1984, being non-resorbable, but compatible with humans and not leading to infection. Although ePTFE is considered the standard for membranes and excellent outcomes have been achieved with this material, they are often contaminated with bacteria (which limits the amount of bone regrowth that will occur) and must eventually be removed via at least one extra surgery 4–6 weeks after the tissue has regrown. Resorbable membranes were developed to avoid these limitations. Non-absorbable ePTFE membranes are still used clinically on a regular basis, and long-term studies suggest that bones regrown with ePTFE function as well as non-augmented naive bone.

=== Resorbable ===
Resorbable membranes are either animal-derived or synthetic polymers. They are gradually hydrolyzed or enzymatically degraded and therefore do not require a second surgical stage of membrane removal. Their sources are varied, beginning in early years with rat or cow collagen, cargile membrane, polylactic acid, polyglycolide, Vicryl, artificial skin and freeze-dried dura mater. Recently developed synthetic membranes often combine different materials.

=== Collagen resorbable membranes ===
Collagen membranes are of either type I or II collagen from cows or pigs. They are often cross-linked and take between four and forty weeks to resorb, depending on the type. Collagen absorbable barrier membranes do not require surgical removal, inhibit migration of epithelial cells, promote the attachment of new connective tissue, are not strongly antigenic and prevent blood loss by promoting platelet aggregation leading to early clot formation and wound stabilization. Collagen membranes may also facilitate primary wound closure via fibroblast chemotactic properties, even after membrane exposure. Compared to ePTFE membranes, resorbable barriers allow for fewer exposures and therefore reduce the effects of infection on newly formed bone. Use of collagen membranes in particular, with bone mineral as a support and space maintainer, has achieved predictable treatment outcomes.

=== Synthetic resorbable membranes ===
Synthetic membranes may be polymers of lactic acid or glycolic acid. Their ester bonds are degraded over 30–60 days, leaving free acids that may be inflammatory. The majority of studies consider synthetics comparable to other membranes like ePTFE and collagen, and one author has found synthetics clinically superior to collagen membranes.

The integrity of resorbable membranes over the healing period has been questioned relative to the ePTFE membranes, but a 2007 study suggested that collagen membranes do allow for bone regeneration, given the correct patient and conditions. Most studies on resorbable membranes do not use appropriate scientific controls or identify the specific membrane used, making it difficult to compare success and failure rates.

=== Amniotic membrane and fibrin glue ===
PETTI Gustavo From Cagliari, Italy has been the first one to have had: "A new attachment: guided tissue regeneration using an amniotic membrane and fibrin glue" Publication: Petti G. (1989) “La rigenerazione parodontale guidata con membrana amniotica e colla di fibrina. (Guided periodontal regeneration with an amniotic membrane and fibrin glue). Il Dentista Moderno, 9, 57-70. Italy

Petti G. (1988) “A new attachment:guided tissue regeneration using an amniotic membrane and fibrin glue-preclinical considerations after 2 years” The Journal of the American Dental Association, JADA/FDI. Free Communications, Periodontics, July, USA

Petti G. (1988) “ A new attachment:guided tissue regeneration using an amniotic membrane and fibrin glue” Dental Abstract, USA

See in The References the others numerous publications
