= Clunn =

- Language: Scottish Gaelic

Origin
- Language: Scottish Gaelic
- Origin: Clunie (Cluainidh)

Clunn is a Scottish surname, relating to Clunie in Perthshire.
Notable people with this name include:

- Harold Clunn (1879–1956), British shipping agent and non-fiction author
- Rick Clunn (born 1946), American competitive bass fisherman
- Tony Clunn (1946–2014), British army major and archaeologist

== See also ==
- Clune (disambiguation)
