= Demineralized freeze dried bone allograft =

Bone graft material

Demineralized freeze dried bone allograft, referred to as DFDBA, is a bone graft material known for its de novo bone formation properties. It is used extensively in bone grafting of alveolar bone in oral and periodontal surgery.
