= Clunes =

Clunes or Clune's may refer to:

== Places ==
- Clunes, Victoria, Australia
  - Electoral district of Clunes and Allandale, representing Clunes in the Victorian Legislative Assembly
  - Shire of Talbot and Clunes, former local government area including Clunes
  - Clunes railway station, Victoria
- Clunes, New South Wales, Australia
- Clunes, Lochaber, Scotland
- Clunes railway station (Scotland), former station north of Kirkhill
- Clune's Auditorium, former name of Hazard's Pavilion, a defunct auditorium in Los Angeles

== People ==
- Alec Clunes (1912–1970), English actor and theatrical manager
- Anna Clunes, British diplomat
- Martin Clunes (born 1961), British actor
  - Martin Clunes: Islands of Australia, an Australian documentary series hosted by Martin Clunes
- Archibald Clunes Innes (1799–1857), Scottish soldier
- Alexander Clunes Sheriff (1816–1878), British politician

== Other uses ==
- Jackie Clunes, character in British television series Hotel Babylon
- Clunes Football Netball Club, athletics organization in Clunes, Victoria

== See also ==
- Clune (disambiguation)
