= Cargile membrane =

Sterile membrane made from the peritoneum of the ox

A Cargile membrane was a sterile membrane made from the peritoneum of the ox, and was the first commercially available adhesion barrier. Its first reported use was in 1905. It was used in abdominal surgery to interpose between raw surfaces and thus prevent the formation of adhesions. It was also used to envelop freshly sutured nerves or tendons, and to protect wounds.

It was designed primarily to cover surfaces over which peritoneum has been removed, especially where a sterile membrane would lessen the formation of adhesion. It was available in the size of 4 × 6 inches, and sometimes used as packaging or a protective sheath.

It was named for American surgeon Charles H. Cargile (1853–1930), who first used it ca. 1900, according to Dorland's Medical Dictionary.
