= Fibrin scaffold =

A fibrin scaffold is a network of protein that holds together and supports a variety of living tissues. It is produced naturally by the body after injury, but also can be engineered as a tissue substitute to speed healing. The scaffold consists of naturally occurring biomaterials composed of a cross-linked fibrin network and has a broad use in biomedical applications.

Fibrin consists of the blood proteins fibrinogen and thrombin which participate in blood clotting. Fibrin glue or fibrin sealant is also referred to as a fibrin based scaffold and used to control surgical bleeding, speed wound healing, seal off hollow body organs or cover holes made by standard sutures, and provide slow-release delivery of medications like antibiotics to tissues exposed.

Fibrin scaffold use is helpful in repairing injuries to the urinary tract, liver lung, spleen, kidney, and heart. In biomedical research, fibrin scaffolds have been used to fill bone cavities, repair neurons, heart valves, vascular grafts and the surface of the eye.

The complexity of biological systems requires customized care to sustain their function. When they are no longer able to perform their purpose, interference of new cells and biological cues is provided by a scaffold material. Fibrin scaffold has many aspects like being biocompatible, biodegradable and easily processable. Furthermore, it has an autologous nature and it can be manipulated in various size and shape. Inherent role in wound healing is helpful in surgical applications. Many factors can be bound to fibrin scaffold and those can be released in a cell-controlled manner. Its stiffness can be managed by changing the concentration according to needs of surrounding or encapsulated cells. Additional mechanical properties can be obtained by combining fibrin with other suitable scaffolds. Each biomedical application has its own characteristic requirement for different kinds of tissues and recent studies with fibrin scaffold are promising towards faster recovery, less complications and long-lasting solutions.

== Advantages of fibrin scaffold ==
Fibrin scaffold is an important element in tissue engineering approaches as a scaffold material. It is advantageous opposed to synthetic polymers and collagen gels when cost, inflammation, immune response, toxicity and cell adhesion are concerned. When there is a trauma in a body, cells at site start the cascade of blood clotting and fibrin is the first scaffold formed normally. To achieve in clinical use of a scaffold, fast and entire incorporation into host tissue is essential. Regeneration of the tissue and the degradation of the scaffold should be balanced in terms of rate, surface area and interaction so that ideal templating can be achieved. Fibrin satisfies many requirements of scaffold functions. Biomaterials made up of fibrin can attach many biological surfaces with high adhesion. Its biocompatibility comes from being not toxic, allergenic or inflammatory. By the help of fibrinolysis inhibitors or fiber cross-linkers, biodegradation can be managed. Fibrin can be provided from individuals to be treated many times so that gels from autologous fibrin have no undesired immunogenic reactions in addition to be reproducible. Inherently, structure and biochemistry of fibrin has an important role in wound healing. Although there are limitations due to diffusion, exceptional cellular growth and tissue development can be achieved. According to the application, fibrin scaffold characteristics can be adjustable by manipulating concentrations of components. Long-lasting durable fibrin hydrogels are enviable in many applications.

== Fibrin gel formation and enrichment ==
Polymerization time of fibrinogen and thrombin is affected primarily by concentration of thrombin and temperature, while fibrinogen concentration has a minor effect. Fibrin gel characterization by scanning electron microscopy reveals that thick fibers make up a dense structure at lower fibrinogen concentrations (5 mg/ml) and thinner fibers and looser gel can be obtained as fibrinogen concentration (20 mg/ml) increases whereas increase in thrombin concentration (from 0.5 U/ml to 5 U/ml) has no such significant result although the fibers steadily get thinner.

Fibrin gels can be enriched by addition of other extracellular matrix (ECM) components such as fibronectin, vitronectin, laminin and collagen. These can be linked covalently to fibrin scaffold by reactions catalyzed by transglutaminase. Laminin originated substrate amino acid sequences for transglutaminase can be IKVAV, YIGSR or RNIAEIIKDI. Collagen originated sequence is DGEA and many other ECM protein originated RGD sequence can be given as other examples. Heparin binding sequences KβAFAKLAARLYRKA, RβAFARLAARLYRRA, KHKGRDVILKKDVR, YKKIIKKL are from antithrombin III, modified antithrombin III, neural cell adhesion molecule and platelet factor 4, respectively. Heparin-binding growth factors can be attached to heparin binding domains via heparin. As a result, a reservoir can be provided instead of passive diffusion by liberation of growth factors in extended time. Acidic and basic fibroblast growth factor, neurotrophin 3, transforming growth factor beta 1, transforming growth factor beta 2, nerve growth factor, brain derived neurotrophic factor can be given as examples for such growth factors.

For some tissues like cartilage, highly dense polymeric scaffolds such as polyethylene glycol (PEG) are essential due to mechanical stress and that can be achieved by combining them with natural biodegradable cell-adhesive scaffolds since cells can not attach to synthetic polymers and take proper signals for normal cell function. Various scaffold combinations with PEG-based hydrogels are studied to assess the chondrogenic response to dynamic strain stimulation in a recent study. PEG-Proteoglycan, PEG-Fibrinogen, PEG-Albumin conjugates and only PEG including hydrogels are used to evaluate the mechanical effect on bovine chondrocytes by using a pneumatic reactor system. The most substantial increase in stiffness is observed in PEG-Fibrinogen conjugated hydrogel after 28 days of mechanical stimulation.

== Use in tissue engineering ==
=== Bone tissue ===
In orthopedics, methods with minimum invasion are desired and improving injectable systems is a leading aim. Bone cavities can be filled by polymerizing materials when injected and adaptation to the shape of the cavity can be provided. Shorter surgical operation time, minimum large muscle retraction harm, smaller scar size, less pain after operation and consequently faster recovery can be obtained by using such systems. In a study to evaluate if injectable fibrin scaffold is helpful for transplantation of bone marrow stromal cell (BMSC) when central nervous system (CNS) tissue is damaged, Yasuda et al. found that BMSC has extended survival, migration and differentiation after transplantation to rat cortical lesion although there is complete degradation of fibrin matrix after four weeks. Another study to assess if fibrin glue enriched with platelet is better than just platelet rich plasma (PRP) on bone formation was conducted. Each combined with bone marrow mesenchymal stem cells and bone morphogenetic protein 2 (BMP-2) are injected into the subcutaneous space. Results shows that fibrin glue enriched with platelet has better osteogenic properties when compared to PRP. To initiate and speed up tissue repair and regeneration, platelet-rich fibrin gels are ideal since they have a high concentration of platelet releasing growth factors and bioactive proteins. Addition of fibrin glue to calcium phosphate granules has promising results leading to faster bone repair by inducing mineralization and possible effects of fibrin on angiogenesis, cell attachment and proliferation.

=== Cardiac tissue ===
Valvular heart disease is a major cause of death globally. Both mechanical valves and fixed biological xenograft or homografts used clinically have many drawbacks. One study focused on fibrin-based heart valves to assess structure and mechanical durability on sheep revealed promising potential for patient originated valve replacements. From autologous arterial-derived cells and fibrin scaffold, tissue engineered heart valves are formed, then mechanically conditioned and transplanted into the pulmonary trunk of the same animals. The preliminary result are potentially hopeful towards autologous heart valve production.

=== Vascular graft ===
In atherosclerosis, a severe disease in modern society, coronary blood vessels occlude. These vessels have to be freed and held open i.e. by stents. Unfortunately after certain time these vessels close again and have to be bypassed to allow for upkeep of circulation. Usually autologous vessels from the patient or synthetic polymer grafts are used for this purpose. Both options have disadvantages. Firstly there are only few autologous vessels available in a human body that might be of low quality, considering the health status of the patient. The synthetic polymer based grafts on the other hand often have insufficient haemocompatibility and thus rapidly occlude - a problem that is especially prone in small calibre grafts. In this context the fibrin-gel-based tissue engineering of autologous vessel substitutes is a very promising approach to overcome the current problems. Cells and fibrin are isolated by a low invasive procedure from the patient and shaped in individual moulds to meet the required dimensions. Additional pre-cultivation in a specialized bioreactor is inevitable to ensure appropriate properties of the graft.

=== Ocular tissue ===
Bullous keratopathy that is characterized by corneal stromal edema related to cell loss and endothelial decompensation as well as subepithelial fibrosis and corneal vascularization in further cases, results vision problems due to loss of corneal transparency. Fibrin glue is used as a sutureless method onto the corneal surface to fix amniotic membrane that is cryopreserved. Complete re-epithelialization on the ocular surface with no symptom is achieved in 3 weeks. Results show that fibrin glue fixation is easy, reliable and efficient with the corneal surface.

=== Nervous tissue ===
Because fibrin fulfills the mechanical aspects of neuronal growth without initiation of glial proliferation, it can be potentially used in neuronal wound healing even with no need of growth factors or such constituents. Neurons and astrocytes, two major cell type of central nervous system, can show various responses to differences in matrix stiffness. Neuronal development of precursor cells is maintained by gels with low elastic modulus. When stiffness of the matrix is more than that of a normal brain, extension of spinal cord and cortical brain neurons is inhibited since neurite extension and branch forming take place on soft materials (<1000Pa). In a study, fibrins from different species are used to compare the effects on neurite growth of mouse spinal cord neurons. Among salmon, bovine and human fibrin in addition to Matrigel, salmon fibrin promotes the neurite growth best and it is more proteolysis resistant than mammalian fibrins. Because down to 0 °C, salmon fibrinogen can clot whereas polymerization of human fibrinogen occurs slowly below 37 °C, this can be taken as an advantage in surgical settings that are cooler. Therefore, for treatment of central nervous system damages, salmon fibrin can be a useful biomaterial.

For sciatic nerve regeneration, fibrin scaffold is used with glial derived neurotrophic factor (GDNF) in a recent study. Survival of both sensory and motor neurons is promoted by glial-derived neurotrophic factor and its delivery to peripheral nervous system improves regeneration after an injury. GDNF and nerve growth factor (NGF) is sequestered in the gel via a bi-domain peptide. This peptide is composed of heparin binding domain and transglutaminase substrate domain which can be cross-linked into the fibrin matrix by polymerization via transglutaminase activity of factor XIIIa. Many neurotrophic factors can bind to heparin through its sulfated domains. This is the affinity-based delivery system in which growth factors are released by cell-based degradation control. After a 13 mm rat sciatic nerve defect is made, the fibrin matrix delivery system is applied to the gap as a nerve guiding channel. Results show that such a delivery system is efficient to enhance maturity and promote organized architecture of nerve regenerating in presence of GDNF, in addition to expressing the promising treatment variations for peripheral nerve injuries.

== Use in gene delivery ==
The use of fibrin hydrogel in gene delivery (transfection) is studied to address essential factors controlling the delivery process such as fibrinogen and pDNA concentration in addition to significance of cell-mediated fibrin degradation for pursuing the potential of cell-transfection microarray engineering or in vivo gene transfer. Gene transfer is more successful in-gel than on-gel probably because of proximity of lipoplexes and target cells. Less cytotoxicity is observed due to less use of transfection agents like lipofectamine and steady degradation of fibrin. Consequently, each cell type requires optimization of fibrinogen and pDNA concentrations for higher transfection yields and studies towards high-throughput transfection microarray experiments are promising.
