= Clune, Pennsylvania =

Unincorporated community in Pennsylvania, US

- Unincorporated community
- Location within Pennsylvania Location within the United States
- Coordinates: 40°33′25″N 79°17′39″W
- Country: United States
- State: Pennsylvania
- County: Indiana
- Township: Young
- Elevation: 1,096 ft (334 m)
- Time zone: UTC-5 (Eastern (EST))
  - Summer (DST): UTC-4 (EDT)
- ZIP code: 15727
- Area code: 724
- GNIS feature ID: 1782050

Clune is an unincorporated community in Indiana County, Pennsylvania, United States. The community is 8.7 miles (14.0 km) west-southwest of Indiana. Clune has a post office with ZIP code 15727.
