= Sinus lift =

Surgery to restore bone for dental implants

X-ray showing a sinus lift in the left upper jaw

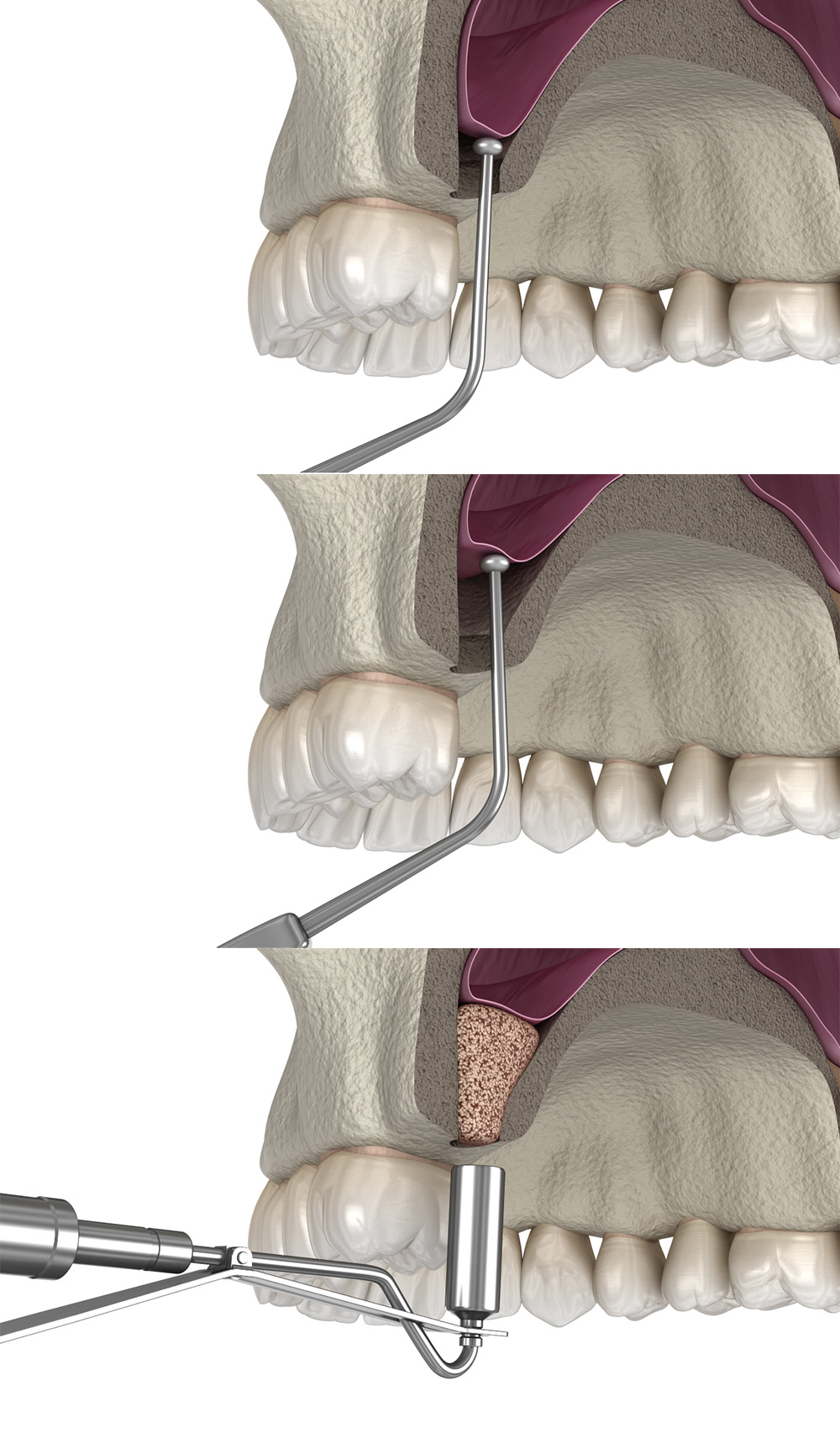
Sinus lift surgery, 3D illustration

Maxillary sinus floor augmentation (also known as a sinus lift, sinus graft, or sinus augmentation) is a surgical procedure that increases the amount of bone in the posterior maxilla by lifting the Schneiderian membrane and placing a bone graft.

After upper jaw tooth loss, the bone may shrink and the sinus cavity can expand into the space. Sinus augmentation restores bone volume, creating a stable foundation for dental implant placement.

== Indications ==
The main indication is to provide sufficient bone under the maxillary sinus for implants.

Sinus pneumatization and bone resorption can follow long-term tooth loss, periodontal disease, or trauma.

Candidates include:

- Loss of one or more posterior maxillary teeth
- Severe bone loss in the posterior maxilla
- Congenital absence of teeth
- Fully edentulous maxilla needing implants

Cochrane reviews report no clear evidence that sinus lifts are more effective than short implants in reducing implant failure.

== Technique ==
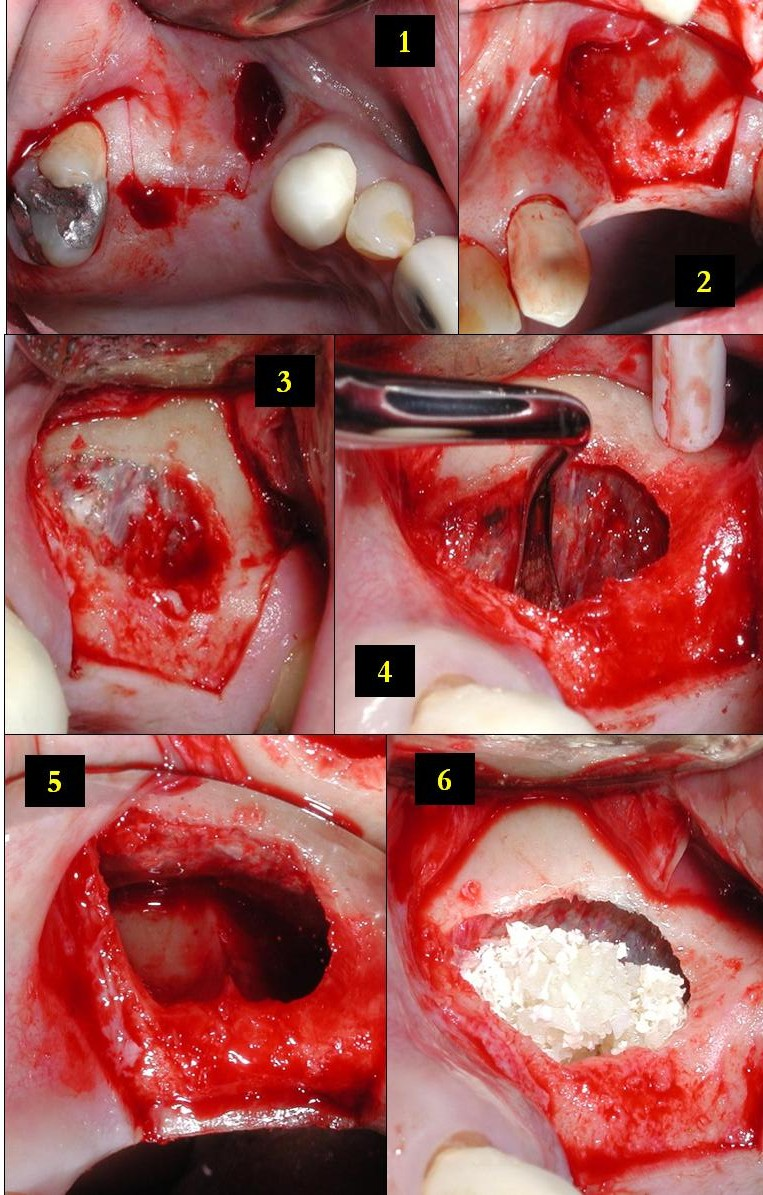
Stages of a lateral window sinus lift procedure

Assessment is made with panoramic radiographs or cone beam computed tomography to evaluate sinus anatomy and rule out pathology.

=== Lateral window technique ===
The lateral (traditional) approach creates a window in the sinus wall, lifts the membrane, and places graft material. Healing usually takes 4–12 months.

Bone substitutes include autograft, allograft, xenograft, and alloplast. Long-term success exceeds 90%.

=== Osteotome technique ===
The osteotome method, developed by Hilt Tatum and later described by Robert B. Summers, uses a transcrestal approach with osteotomes. It is less invasive but limited in augmentation. Implant survival remains high.

Variations include the Localized Management of Sinus Floor (LMSF) technique and use of electrical mallets to simplify transcrestal elevation.

== Complications ==
Reported complications include:

- Schneiderian membrane perforation
- Sinusitis
- Infection
- Inflammation
- Pain, bleeding, or graft failure

== Recovery ==
Bone healing generally requires 3–6 months, though implants can sometimes be placed simultaneously.

== History ==
The sinus lift was pioneered by Hilt Tatum in 1974 (Opelika, Alabama). Philip Boyne and R. A. James published the first reports in 1980.

== Cost-effectiveness ==
The transalveolar method is less costly and invasive, while the lateral window is more effective in severe cases.
