= Easter Clune Castle =

Location
- Coordinates: 57.0132°N 2.639°W

Site history
- Built: 14th century

Easter Clune Castle is a ruined 16th-century tower house, about 6 miles (9.7 km) south-west of Banchory, Aberdeenshire, Scotland, and south of the Water of Feugh

== History ==
The castle is thought to have been built by Archbishop James Stewart or Archbishop Ross.

== Structure ==
Little of the castle remains: only about 2 metres (6 ft 7 in) of the south-east corner. The walls are about 4.5 metres (15 ft) high and 1.2 metres (3 ft 11 in) thick.

- Castles in Great Britain and Ireland
- List of castles in Scotland
