= Cluneal nerves =

The cluneal nerves (or clunial nerves) are cutaneous nerves of the buttocks. They are often classified according to where on the buttocks they innervate. Specifically, the nerves are as follows:

- Superior cluneal nerves
- Medial cluneal nerves
- Inferior cluneal nerves
