= Bone grafting =

Bone transplant

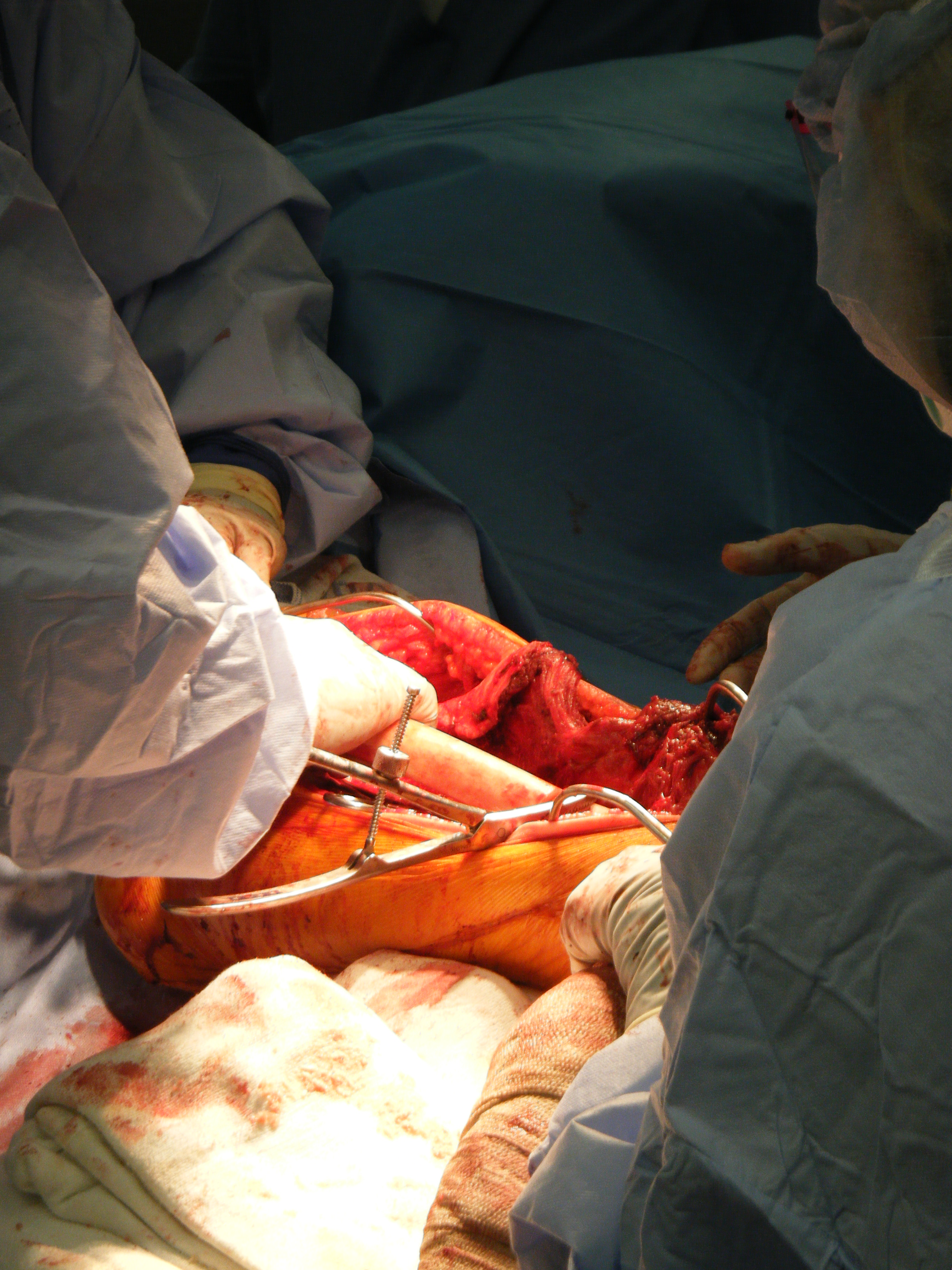
- A surgeon places a bone graft into position during a limb salvage.
- ICD-9-CM: 78.0
- MeSH: D016025
- MedlinePlus: 002963

Bone grafting is a type of transplantation used to replace missing bone tissue or stimulate the healing of fractures. This surgical procedure is useful for repairing bone fractures that are extremely complex, pose a significant health risk to the patient, or fail to heal properly, leading to pseudoarthrosis. While some small or acute fractures can heal without bone grafting, the risk is greater for large fractures, such as compound fractures. Additionally, structural or morcellized bone grafting can be used in joint replacement revision surgery when wide osteolysis is present.

Bone generally has the ability to regenerate completely but requires a very small fracture space or some sort of scaffold to do so. Bone grafts may be autologous (bone harvested from the patient's own body, often from the iliac crest), allograft (cadaveric bone usually obtained from a bone bank), or synthetic (often made of hydroxyapatite or other naturally occurring and biocompatible substances) with similar mechanical properties to bone. Most bone grafts are expected to be resorbed and replaced as the natural bone heals over a few months' time.

The principles involved in successful bone grafts include osteoconduction (guiding the reparative growth of the natural bone), osteoinduction (encouraging undifferentiated cells to become active osteoblasts), and osteogenesis (living bone cells in the graft material contribute to bone remodeling). Osteogenesis only occurs with autograft tissue and allograft cellular bone matrices.

A more recent application of bone grafting is its use as an antibiotic carrier. Infected bone is poorly perfused, making it difficult to achieve an appropriate antibiotic concentration at the site of infection when intravenous administration is used, especially for antibiotics with large molecules such as vancomycin. In such cases, impacted morcellized bone allografts (IBG), impregnated with local antibiotics can achieve much higher concentrations of antibiotics locally than the minimum inhibitory concentration (MIC).

== Biological mechanism ==
Properties of various types of bone graft sources.
	Osteoconductive	Osteoinductive	Osteogenic
Alloplast	+	–	–
Xenograft	+	–	–
Allograft	+	+/–	–
Autograft	+	+	+

Bone grafting is possible because bone tissue, unlike most other tissues, has the ability to regenerate completely if provided the space into which to grow. As native bone grows, it will generally replace the graft material completely, resulting in a fully integrated region of new bone. The biologic mechanisms that provide a rationale for bone grafting are osteoconduction, osteoinduction and osteogenesis.

=== Osteoconduction ===
Osteoconduction is termed as "the property of a material to support tissue ingrowth, osteoprogenitor cell growth, and development for bone formation to occur". In the context of bone grafting it occurs when the bone graft material serves as a scaffold for new bone growth that is perpetuated by the native bone. Osteoblasts from the margin of the defect that is being grafted utilize the bone graft material as a framework upon which to spread and generate new bone. Osteoblasts do not originate from the donor tissue, but through the internal ingrowing of the host's cells. The proper bonding of bioactive chemicals (Beta-Tricalcium Phosphate) in implants used in bone grafting surgery allow the promotion of osteoconductivity in the area of a defect. In the very least, a bone graft material should be osteoconductive by being made up of these bioactive chemicals.

=== Osteoinduction ===
Osteoinduction involves the stimulation of osteoprogenitor cells to differentiate into osteoblasts that then begin new bone formation. The most widely studied type of osteoinductive cell mediators is bone morphogenetic proteins (BMPs). A bone graft material that is osteoconductive and osteoinductive will not only serve as a scaffold for currently existing osteoblasts but will also trigger the formation of new osteoblasts, theoretically promoting faster integration of the graft.

=== Osteopromotion ===
Osteopromotion involves the enhancement of osteoinduction without the possession of osteoinductive properties. For example, enamel matrix derivative has been shown to enhance the osteoinductive effect of demineralized freeze dried bone allograft (DFDBA), but will not stimulate new bone growth alone.

=== Osteogenesis ===
Osteogenesis occurs when vital osteoblasts originating from the bone graft material contribute to new bone growth along with bone growth generated via the other two mechanisms.

== Method ==
Depending on where the bone graft is needed, a different doctor may be requested to do the surgery. Doctors and physicians that perform bone graft procedures are commonly orthopedic surgeons, otolaryngology head and neck surgeon, neurosurgeons, craniofacial surgeons, oral and maxillofacial surgeons, podiatric surgeons and periodontists, dental surgeons, oral surgeons and implantologists.

=== Autograft ===
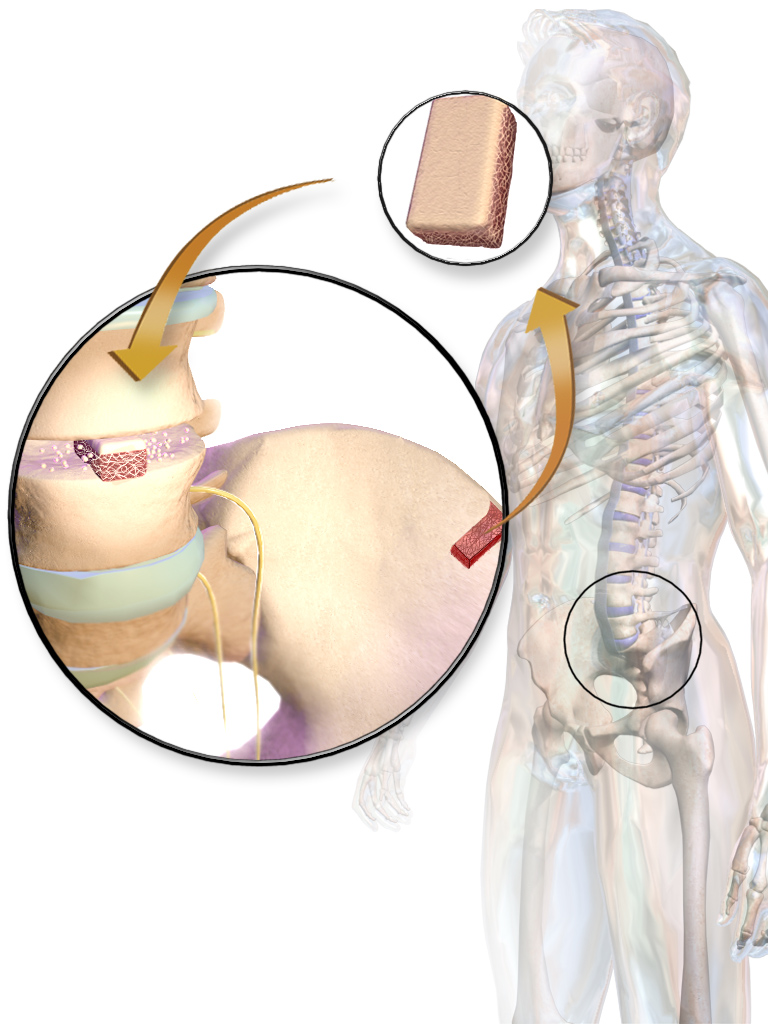
Illustration of an autograft harvested from iliac crest

Autologous (or autogenous) bone grafting involves utilizing bone obtained from the same individual receiving the graft. Bone can be harvested from non-essential bones, such as from the iliac crest, or more commonly in oral and maxillofacial surgery, from the mandibular symphysis (chin area) or anterior mandibular ramus (the coronoid process); this is particularly true for block grafts, in which a small block of bone is placed whole in the area being grafted. When a block graft will be performed, autogenous bone is the most preferred because there is less risk of the graft rejection because the graft originated from the patient's own body. As indicated in the chart above, such a graft would be osteoinductive and osteogenic, as well as osteoconductive. A negative aspect of autologous grafts is that an additional surgical site is required, in effect adding another potential location for post-operative pain and complications.

Autologous bone is typically harvested from intra-oral sources as the chin or extra-oral sources as the iliac crest, the fibula, the ribs, the mandible and even parts of the skull.

All bone requires a blood supply in the transplanted site. Depending on where the transplant site is and the size of the graft, an additional blood supply may be required. For these types of grafts, extraction of the part of the periosteum and accompanying blood vessels along with donor bone is required. This kind of graft is known as a vital bone graft.

An autograft may also be performed without a solid bony structure, for example, using bone reamed from the anterior superior iliac spine. In this case, there is an osteoinductive and osteogenic action, however, there is no osteoconductive action, as there is no solid bony structure.

Chin offers a large amount of cortico-cancellous autograft and easy access among all the intraoral sites. It can be easily harvested in the office settings under local anaesthesia on an outpatient basis. Proximity of the donor and recipient sites reduce operative time and cost. Convenient surgical access, low morbidity, elimination of hospital stay, minimal donor site discomfort and avoidance of cutaneous scars are the added advantages.

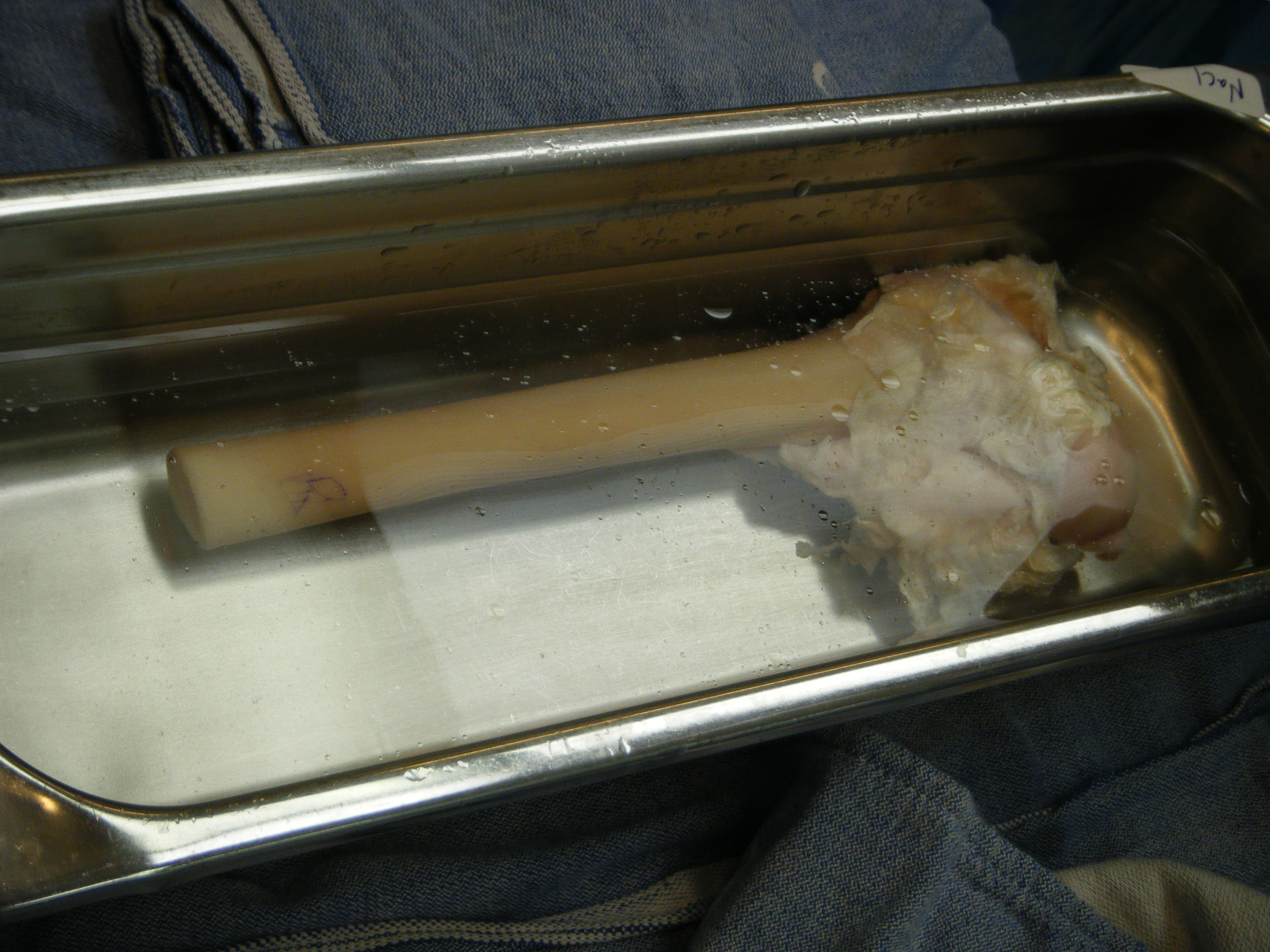
A bone allograft

=== Dentin graft ===
Dentin bone, made from extracted teeth, comprises more than 85% of tooth structure, the enamel consists of HA mineral and comprises 10% of tooth structure. Dentin is similar to bone in its chemical composition, by volume 70–75% is HA mineral and 20% organic matrix, mostly fibrous type I collagen. Dentin, like bone, may release growth and differentiating factors while being resorbed by osteoclasts. In order to make the dentin graft usable and bacteria-free, some companies have developed clinical procedures which include grinding, sorting and cleaning of the teeth for immediate or future use. In Korea, the Korea Tooth Bank performed bio-recycling of 38 000 patients' own teeth from January 2009 until October 2012.

=== Allografts ===
Allograft bone, like autogenous bone, is derived from humans; the difference is that allograft is harvested from an individual other than the one receiving the graft. Allograft bone can be taken from cadavers that have donated their bone so that it can be used for living people who are in need of it; it is typically sourced from a bone bank. Bone banks also supply allograft bone sourced from living human bone donors (usually hospital inpatients) who are undergoing elective total hip arthroplasty (total hip replacement surgery). During total hip replacement, the orthopaedic surgeon removes the patient's femoral head, as a necessary part of the process of inserting the artificial hip prosthesis. The femoral head is a roughly spherical area of bone, located at the proximal end of the femur, with a diameter of 45 mm to 56 mm in adult humans. The patient's femoral head is most frequently discarded to hospital waste at the end of the surgical procedure. However, if a patient satisfies a number of stringent regulatory, medical and social history criteria, and provides informed consent, their femoral head may be deposited in the hospital's bone bank.

There are three types of bone allograft available:

1. Fresh or fresh-frozen bone
2. Freeze-dried bone allograft (FDBA)
3. Demineralized freeze-dried bone allograft (DFDBA)

=== Alloplastic grafts ===
Alloplastic grafts may be made from hydroxyapatite, a naturally occurring mineral that is also the main mineral component of bone. They may be made from bioactive glass. Hydroxylapatite is a synthetic bone graft, which is the most used now among other synthetic due to its osteoconduction, hardness and acceptability by bone. Tricalcium phosphate which is now used in combination with hydroxylapatite thus give both effect osteoconduction and resorbability. Polymers such as some microporous grades of PMMA and various other acrylates (such as polyhydroxylethylmethacrylate aka PHEMA), coated with calcium hydroxide for adhesion, are also used as alloplastic grafts for their inhibition of infection and their mechanical resilience and biocompatibility. Calcifying marine algae such as Corallina officinalis have a fluorohydroxyapatitic composition whose structure is similar to human bone and offers gradual resorption, thus it is treated and standardized as "FHA (Fluoro-hydroxy-apatitic) biomaterial" alloplastic bone grafts.

==== Synthetic variants ====
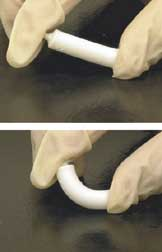
Flexible hydrogel-HA composite, which has a mineral-to-organic matrix ratio approximating that of human bone

Artificial bone can be created from ceramics such as calcium phosphates (e.g. hydroxyapatite and tricalcium phosphate), Bioglass and calcium sulfate; all of which are biologically active to different degrees depending on solubility in the physiological environment. These materials can be doped with growth factors, ions such as strontium or mixed with bone marrow aspirate to increase biological activity. Some authors believe this method is inferior to autogenous bone grafting; however, infection and rejection of the graft is much less of a risk, and the mechanical properties such as Young's modulus are comparable to bone. The presence of elements such as strontium can result in higher bone mineral density and enhanced osteoblast proliferation in vivo.

==== Temporary spacer ====
A synthetic material may be used as a temporary antibiotic spacer before being replaced by a more permanent material. For example, the Masquelet procedure consists of initially using PMMA mixed with an antibiotic (vancomycin or gentamicin) for 4–12 weeks, and then replacing the space with an autologous bone graft. It can be used to treat posttraumatic bone defects.

=== Xenografts ===
Bone xenografts are an alternative form of bone grafts that involve transplanting different animal species cells into humans. This graft can range from orthopedic to dental uses. Most xenografts are derived from bovine sources such as cows or pigs and are sterilized and processed for safe implantation into human tissue. They can be freeze dried or demineralized and deproteinized. Xenografts are usually only distributed as a calcified matrix. Madrepore and or millepore type of corals are harvested and treated to become 'coral derived granules' (CDG) and other types of coralline xenografts. Coral based xenografts are mainly calcium carbonate (and an important proportion of fluorides, useful in the context of grafting to promote bone development) while natural human bone is made of hydroxyapatite along with calcium phosphate and carbonate: the coral material is thus either transformed industrially into hydroxyapatite through a hydrothermal process, yielding a non-resorbable xenograft, or simply the process is omitted and the coralline material remains in its calcium carbonate state for better resorption of the graft by the natural bone. The coral xenograft is then saturated with growth-enhancing gels and solutions.

=== Health Risks ===
Studies show that xenografts can be used, however they are closely monitored due to their risk of rejection. Zoonoses, which are diseases that arise from the crossing of animal and human tissue, pose a threat to the success of xenograft implantation. Specifically, these diseases are referenced as "xenozoonoses". They can be categorized in 3 different groups: viral infection, prion-mediated infection, and bacterial infection. They have the potential to create a public health risk if they are not closely monitored, as they can cause diseases to be more easily transmissible through different species.

=== Growth Factors ===
Growth Factor enhanced grafts are produced using recombinant DNA technology. They consist of either Human Growth Factors or Morphogens (Bone Morphogenic Proteins in conjunction with a carrier medium, such as collagen).

=== Recovery and aftercare ===
The time it takes for an individual to recover depends on the severity of the injury being treated and lasts anywhere from two weeks to two months, with a possibility of vigorous exercise being barred for up to six months. Distal femoral bone graft takes up to six months to heal.

== Uses ==
=== Dental implants ===
The most common use of bone grafting is in the application of dental implants to restore the edentulous area of a missing tooth. Dental implants require bones underneath them for support and proper integration into the mouth. As mentioned earlier bone grafts come in various forms such as autologous (from the same person), Allograft, Xenograft (mainly bovine bone), and Alloplastic materials. Bone grafts can be used prior to implant placement or simultaneously. People who have been edentulous (without teeth) for a prolonged period may not have enough bone left in the necessary locations. In this case, autologous bone can be taken from the chin, from the pilot holes for the implants, or even from the iliac crest of the pelvis and inserted into the mouth underneath the new implant. Alternatively, exogenous bone can be used: xenograft is the most commonly used, because it offers the advantage of exceptional volume stability over time. Allograft offers the best regeneration quality but has lower volume stability. Often a mix of different kinds of bone grafts is used.

In general, bone graft is either used en bloc (such as from the chin or the ascending ramus area of the lower jaw) or particulated, in order to be able to adapt it better to a defect.

Dental bone grafting is a specialized oral surgical procedure that has been developed to reestablish lost jawbone. This loss can be a result of dental infection of abscess, periodontal disease, trauma, or the natural process of aging. There are various reasons for replacing lost bone tissue and encouraging natural bone growth, and each technique tackles jawbone defects differently. Reasons that bone grafting might be needed include sinus augmentation, socket preservation, ridge augmentation, or regeneration. There is currently some evidence supporting the use of autologous platelet concentrates (cell fragments containing growth factors to promote tissue regeneration) when bone grafting is used to treat gum disease.

=== Fibular shaft ===
Another common bone graft, which is more substantial than those used for dental implants, is of the fibular shaft. After the segment of the fibular shaft has been removed normal activities such as running and jumping are permitted on the leg with the bone deficit. The grafted, vascularized fibulas have been used to restore skeletal integrity to long bones of limbs in which congenital bone defects exist and to replace segments of bone after trauma or malignant tumor invasion. The periosteum and nutrient artery are generally removed with the piece of bone so that the graft will remain alive and grow when transplanted into the new host site. Once the transplanted bone is secured into its new location it generally restores blood supply to the bone in which it has been attached.

=== Other ===
Bone grafts are used in hopes that the defective bone will be healed or will regrow with little to no graft rejection. Besides the main use of bone grafting – dental implants – this procedure is used to fuse joints to prevent movement, repair broken bones that have bone loss, and repair broken bone that has not yet healed. Furthermore, bone grafts or substitutes are widely used for augmentation of spinal fusion procedures.

== Risks ==
As with any procedure, there are risks involved; these include reactions to medicine, problems breathing, bleeding, and infection. Infection is reported to occur in less than 1% of cases and is curable with antibiotics. Overall, patients with a preexisting illness are at a higher risk of getting an infection as opposed to those who are overall healthy.

=== Risks for grafts from the iliac crest ===
Some of the potential risks and complications of bone grafts employing the iliac crest as a donor site include:

- acquired bowel herniation (this becomes a risk for larger donor sites (>4 cm)). About 20 cases have been reported in the literature from 1945 until 1989 and only a few hundred cases have been reported worldwide
- meralgia paresthetica (injury to the lateral femoral cutaneous nerve also called Bernhardt-Roth's syndrome)
- pelvic instability
- fracture (extremely rare and usually with other factors)
- injury to the clunial nerves (this will cause posterior pelvic pain which is worsened by sitting)
- injury to the ilioinguinal nerve
- infection
- minor hematoma (a common occurrence)
- deep hematoma requiring surgical intervention
- seroma
- ureteral injury
- pseudoaneurysm of iliac artery (rare)
- tumor transplantation
- cosmetic defects (chiefly caused by not preserving the superior pelvic brim)
- chronic pain

Bone grafts harvested from the posterior iliac crest in general have less morbidity, but depending on the type of surgery, may require a flip while the patient is under general anesthesia.

== Costs ==
Bone graft procedures consist of more than just the surgery itself. The complete three-month total cost of a complex posterolateral lumbar spine fusion bone graft supplemented with graft extenders ranges from a mean of approximately US$33,860 to US$37,227. This price includes all visits in and out of the hospital for three months. Besides the cost of the bone graft itself (ranging from US$250 to US$900) other expenses for the procedure include: outpatient rehabilitation fees (US$5,000 to US$7,000), screws and rods (US$7,500), room and board (US$5,000), operating room (US$3,500), sterile supplies (US$1,100), physical therapy (US$1,000), surgeon's fees (average US$3,500), anesthesiologist fees (approximately US$350 to US$400 per hour), medication charges (US$1,000), and additional fees for services such as medical supplies, diagnostic procedures, equipment use fees, etc.

== See also ==
- Bone healing
- CNT Network Bio-Stress Sensors
- Graft-versus-host disease
- Hydroxyapatite
- Oral and Maxillofacial Surgery
- Orthopedic surgery
- Osseointegration
- Periodontics
