= Osteomyelitis of the jaws =

Infection of bone marrow in the jaws

Osteomyelitis of the jaws is osteomyelitis (which is infection and inflammation of the bone marrow, sometimes abbreviated to OM) which occurs in the bones of the jaws (i.e. maxilla or the mandible). Historically, osteomyelitis of the jaws was a common complication of odontogenic infection (infections of the teeth). Before the antibiotic era, it was frequently a fatal condition.

Former and colloquial names include Osteonecrosis of the jaws (ONJ), cavitations, dry or wet socket, and NICO (Neuralgia-Inducing Cavitational osteonecrosis). The current, more correct, term, osteomyelitis of the jaws, differentiates the condition from the relatively recent and better known phenomenon of bisphosphonate-caused osteonecrosis of the jaws. The latter is found primarily in post-menopausal women given bisphosphonate medications, usually against osteoporosis.

== Classification ==
The classification is similar to the classification of OM generally, according to the length of time the inflammation has been present and whether there is suppuration (the formation of pus). Acute osteomyelitis is loosely defined as OM which has been present for less than one month and chronic osteomyelitis is the term used for when the condition lasts for more than one month. Suppurative osteomyelitis of the jaws is uncommon in developed regions, and more common in developing countries. In Europe and the United States, most cases follow dental infections, oral surgery or mandibular fractures. There have been many reported cases occurring in Africa which are coexistent with acute necrotizing ulcerative gingivitis or cancrum oris.

In the pre-antibiotic era, acute OM of the jaws was more extensive. Massive, diffuse infections commonly involved the whole side of the mandible, or the whole of one side and the opposite side as far as the mental foramen. Localized osteomyelitis tended to be described as either vertical, where a short segment of the body of the mandible from the alveolar crest to the lower border was involved, and alveolar, where a segment of alveolar bone down to the level of the inferior alveolar canal would sequestrate, including the sockets of several teeth. Treatment with antibiotics has significantly altered the natural history of OM of the jaws. Today, however, the condition is often a hidden infection, due in part to not being visible on most dental X-rays unless there is a substantial loss of bone density. In addition, some schools of dentistry do not recognize "silent" OM of the jaws—occurrence of the condition without visually obvious manifestations—in their curriculum. In addition, as circulation is intrinsically diminished in jawbones, antibiotics are frequently ineffective.

== Signs and symptoms ==
The signs and symptoms depend upon the type of OM, and may include:

- Pain, which is severe, throbbing and deep-seated and often radiates along the nerve pathways.
- Initially fistula are not present.
- Headache or facial pain, as in the descriptive former term "neuralgia-inducing" (cavitational osteonecrosis).
- Fibromyalgia.
- Chronic fatigue syndrome.
- Swelling. External swelling is initially due to inflammatory edema with accompanying erythema (redness), heat and tenderness, and then later may be due to sub-periosteal pus accumulation. Eventually, subperiosteal bone formation may give a firm swelling.
- Trismus (difficulty opening the mouth), which may be present in some cases and is caused by edema in the muscles.
- Dysphagia (difficulty swallowing), which may be present in some cases and is caused by edema in the muscles.
- Cervical lymphadenitis (swelling of the lymph nodes in the neck).
- Aesthesia or paresthesia (altered sensation such as numbness or pins and needles) in the distribution of the mental nerve.
- Fever which may be present in the acute phase and is high and intermittent
- Malaise (general feeling of being unwell) which may be present in the acute phase
- Anorexia (loss of appetite).
- Leukocytosis (elevated numbers of white blood cells) which may be present in the acute phase
- Elevated erythrocyte sedimentation rate and C reactive protein are sometimes present.
- An obvious cause in the mouth (usually) such as a decayed tooth.
- Teeth that are tender to percussion, which may develop as the condition progresses.
- Loosening of teeth, which may develop as the condition progresses.
- Pus may later be visible, which exudes from around the necks of teeth, from an open socket, or from other sites within the mouth or on the skin over the involved bone.
- Fetid odor.

Unlike acute OM in the long bones, acute OM in the jaws gives only a moderate systemic reaction and systemic inflammatory markers, such as blood tests, usually remain normal. Acute OM of the jaws may give a similar appearance to a typical odontogenic infection or dry socket, but cellulitis does not tend to spread from the periosteal envelope of the involved bone. If the infection is not controlled, the process becomes chronic and visible signs may be present, including draining fistulas, loosening of teeth and sequestra formation. Untreated chronic osteomyelitis tends to feature occasional acute exacerbations.

== Cause ==
OM is usually a polymicrobial, opportunistic infection, caused primarily by a mixture of alpha hemolytic streptococci and anaerobic bacteria from the oral cavity such as Peptostreptococcus, Fusobacterium and Prevotella, (in contrast to OM of the long bones, usually caused by isolated Staphylococcus aureus infection). These are the same as the common causative organisms in odotonogenic infections. However, when OM in the jaws follows trauma, is the likely cause is still staphylococcal (usually Staphylococcus epidermidis).

Other risk factors can be any familial hypercoagulation tendency, including for example, Factor V (Five) Leiden heterozygosity.

== Pathogenesis ==
OM may occur by direct inoculation of pathogens into the bone (through surgery or injury), by spread of an adjacent area of infection or by seeding of the infection from a non adjacent site via the blood supply (hematogenous spread). Unlike OM of the long bones, hematogenous OM in the bones of the jaws is rare. OM of the jaws is mainly caused by spread of adjacent odontogenic infection. The second most common cause is trauma, including traumatic fracture and usually following a compound fracture (i.e. one that communicates with the mouth or the external environment). In OM of the long bones, a single invading pathogenic micro-organism is usually found (commonly staphylococci spp.).

The mandible is affected more commonly than the maxilla. This is thought to be related to the differences in blood supply between the mandible and the maxilla. The maxilla has a better blood supply, and has thin cortical plates and less medullary spaces. These factors mean that infections of the maxilla are not readily confined to the bone, and readily dissipate edema and pus into the surrounding soft tissues and the paranasal air sinuses. OM of the maxilla may rarely occur during an uncontrolled infection of the middle ear or in infants who have sustained birth injury due to forceps. The mandible in contrast has a relatively poor blood supply, which deteriorates with increasing age. The cortical plates are thick and there is a medullary cavity. The sites of the mandible most commonly affected by OM are (decreasing order of frequency) the body, the symphysis, the angle, the ramus and finally the condyle. The mandible's blood supply is primarily via the inferior alveolar artery, and secondarily via the periosteum. Compromise of this supply is a critical factor in the development of OM in the mandible.

Most periapical and periodontal infections are isolated by the body which produces a protective pyogenic membrane or abscess wall to keep the area of infection localized. Micro-organisms which are sufficiently virulent may destroy this barrier. Factors which may contribute to this are decreased host resistance, surgery or repeated movement of fracture segments, as may occur with an untreated fracture. Mechanical trauma burnishes the bone, causing ischemia by crushing blood vessels and seeds micro-organisms into the tissues.

The events preceding OM are acute inflammatory changes such as hyperemia, increased capillary permeability and infiltration of granulocytes. Proteolytic enzymes are released, and thrombus formation in the blood vessels and tissue necrosis occur. Pus accumulates in the medullary spaces of the bone, which increases the pressure and leads to collapse of the blood vessels, venous stasis and ischemia. Pus may also spread to the sub-periosteal layer, dissecting it away from the surface of the bone and further reducing the blood supply. The inferior alveolar neurovascular bundle is compressed within the mandible, causing anesthesia or paresthesia in the distribution of the mental nerve. Pus may drain via sinuses on the skin and in the mouth, and these may in time become lined with epithelium, when they are termed fistulas.

Chronic OM is characterized by a degree of healing which takes place as a lesser degree of inflammation is present. Granulation tissue and new blood vessels form, and fragments of necrotic bone (sequestra) are separated from vital bone. Small sections of necrotic bone may be resorbed completely, and larger segments may become surrounded by granulation tissue and new bone (an involucrum). Sequestra may also be revascularized by new blood vessels, cause no symptoms or become chronically infected. Sometimes the involucrum is penetrated by channels (cloacae) through which pus drains to the skin or mouth.

OM of the jaws often occurs in the presence of one or more predisposing factors. These factors are related to compromised vascular perfusion locally, regionally or systemically, causes of immunocompromise and poor wound healing. Specific examples include familial hypercoagulation, diabetes, autoimmune diseases, Agranulocytosis, leukemia, severe anemia, syphilis, chemotherapy, corticosteroid therapy, sickle cell disease, acquired immunodeficiency syndrome, old age, malnutrition, smoking and alcohol consumption, radiotherapy, osteoporosis, Paget's disease of bone, fibrous dysplasia, bone malignancy and causes of bone necrosis such as Bismuth, Mercury or arsenic. Poor compliance or access to health care is also a risk factor.

Rarely, OM of the jaws may be a complication of trigeminal herpes zoster.

== Prevention ==
Regular dental and periodontal assessment and care.

== Treatment ==
Culture and sensitivity of the wound site determines the choice of antibiotic; however positive cultures rates are generally low for OM, leading to the need for empirical treatment and an increased risk of antibiotic failure. PCR testing may also be done to identify microbe DNA. Repeated culture and sensitivity testing is often carried out in OM since the treatment is prolonged and antibiotic resistance may occur, when a change in the drug may be required.

== Prognosis ==
Pathologic fracture of the mandible is a possible complication of OM where the bone has been weakened significantly.

== Epidemiology ==
OM of the jaws can occur in all genders, races and age groups. The mandible is affected more commonly than the maxilla. Globally, the most common cause of OM of the jaws is the spread of adjacent odontogenic infection, followed by trauma, including fracture and surgery.
