= Mandibular incisive canal =

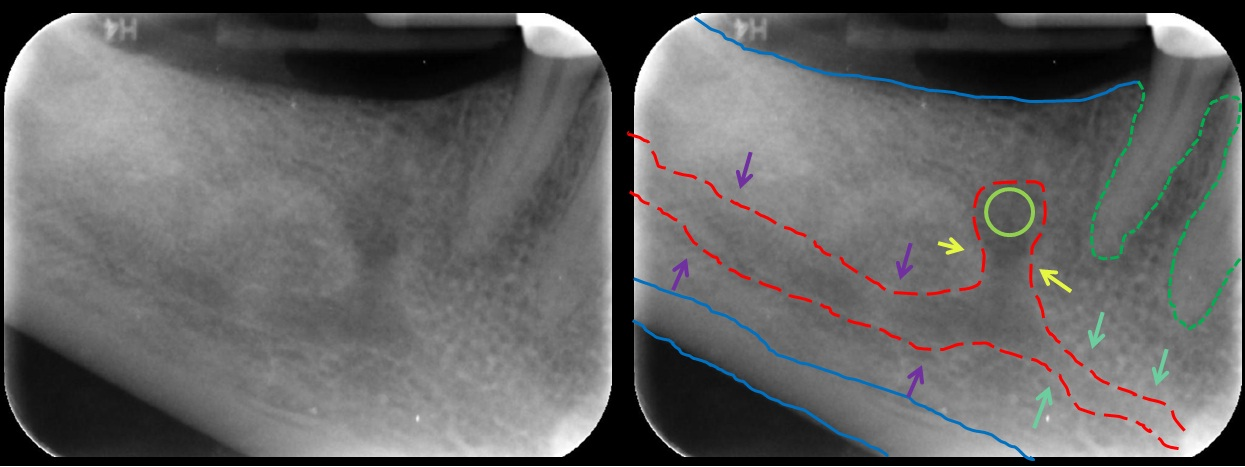
- The mandibular incisive canal (indicated here by coral green arrows) continuing anteriorly (to the right) from the mandibular canal (purple arrows) after the mental foramen (light green circle).

Details

Identifiers
- Latin: canalis incisivus mandibulae

The mandibular incisive canal is a bilaterally paired bony canal within the anterior portion of the mandible that extends from the mental foramen (usually) to near the ipsilateral lateral incisor teeth.

The inferior alveolar nerve splits into its two terminal branches within the mandibular canal: the mental nerve (which exits the mandible through the mental foramen), and the incisive nerve which represents an anterior continuation of the inferior alveolar nerve and continues to course within the mandible in the mandibular incisive canal. The incisive nerve provides innervation to the mandibular first premolar, canine and lateral and central incisors. The incisive nerve either terminates as nerve endings within the anterior teeth or adjacent bone, or may join nerve endings that enter through the tiny lingual foramen.

The incisive canal is typically found within the middle third of the mandible in an apico-coronal dimension, reaching the midline 18% of the time.

== See also ==
- Maxillary incisive canal
