= Mentalis =

Muscle that raises the central portion of the lower lip

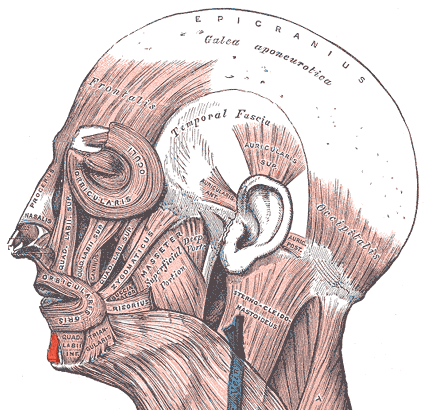
- Muscles of the head, face, and neck.

Details
- Origin: Anterior mandible
- Insertion: Chin
- Nerve: Mandibular branch of facial nerve
- Actions: Elevates and wrinkles skin of chin, protrudes lower lip

Identifiers
- Latin: musculus mentalis
- TA98: A04.1.03.037
- TA2: 2087
- FMA: 46825

The mentalis muscle is a paired central muscle of the lower lip, situated at the tip of the chin. It originates from the mentum of the mandible, and inserts into the soft tissue of the chin. It is sometimes referred to as the "pouting muscle" (as in duck face) due to it raising the lower lip and causing chin wrinkles.

== Structure ==
The mentalis muscle originates from the mental protuberance of the mandible near the midline. It inserts into the soft tissue and skin of the chin.

== Function ==
The mentalis muscle causes a weak upward-inward movement of the soft tissue complex of the chin. This raises the central portion of the lower lip. In the setting of lip incompetence (the upper and lower lips not touching each other at rest), the contraction of the mentalis muscle can bring temporary but strained oral competence.

In conjunction with the orbicularis oris muscle (for the upper lip), the mentalis muscle allows the lips to "pout". Externally, contraction of the mentalis muscle causes wrinkling and dimpling of the skin on the chin, as used in expressions of doubt or displeasure.

== Clinical significance ==
The mentalis muscle can be easily assessed using ultrasound.

=== Geniospasm ===
Geniospasm is a genetic movement disorder of the mentalis muscle. It involves repetitive contraction of the muscle, with episodes lasting between seconds and hours. Certain medications may be used to treat it, such as haloperidol and benzodiazepines. Injection of botulinum toxin (to temporarily paralyse the muscle) may be more effective.

=== Cosmetics ===
The mentalis muscle may be partially paralysed using botulinum toxin to reduce wrinkling of the skin of the chin. This may be done for cosmetic purposes.

== Additional images ==
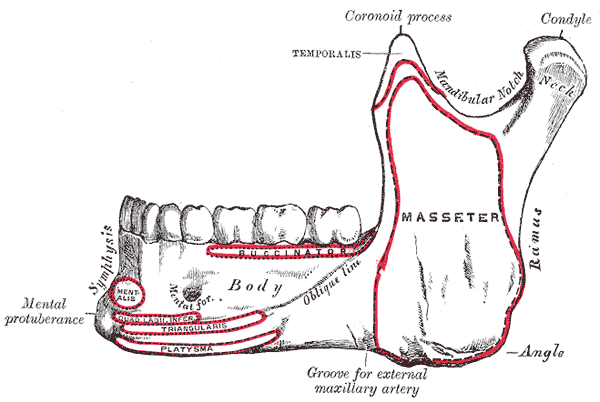
Outer surface of mandible. Mentalis is indicated by the red circle at left.

Position of mentalis (red)

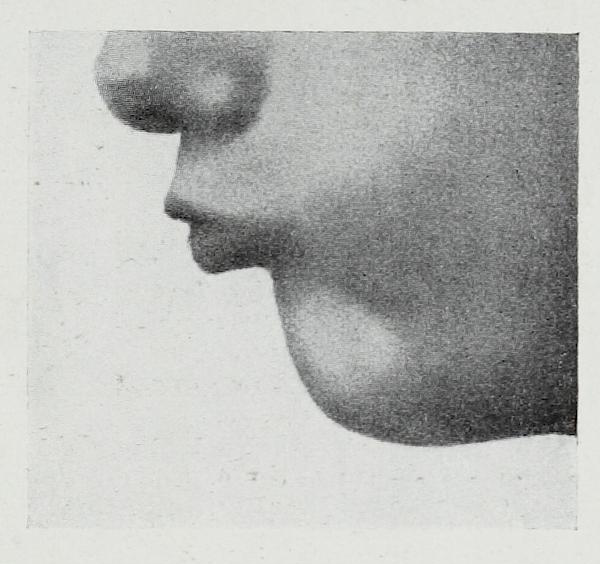
Action of the mentalis muscle
