= Mandibular foramen =

Opening on the inner surface of the mandible

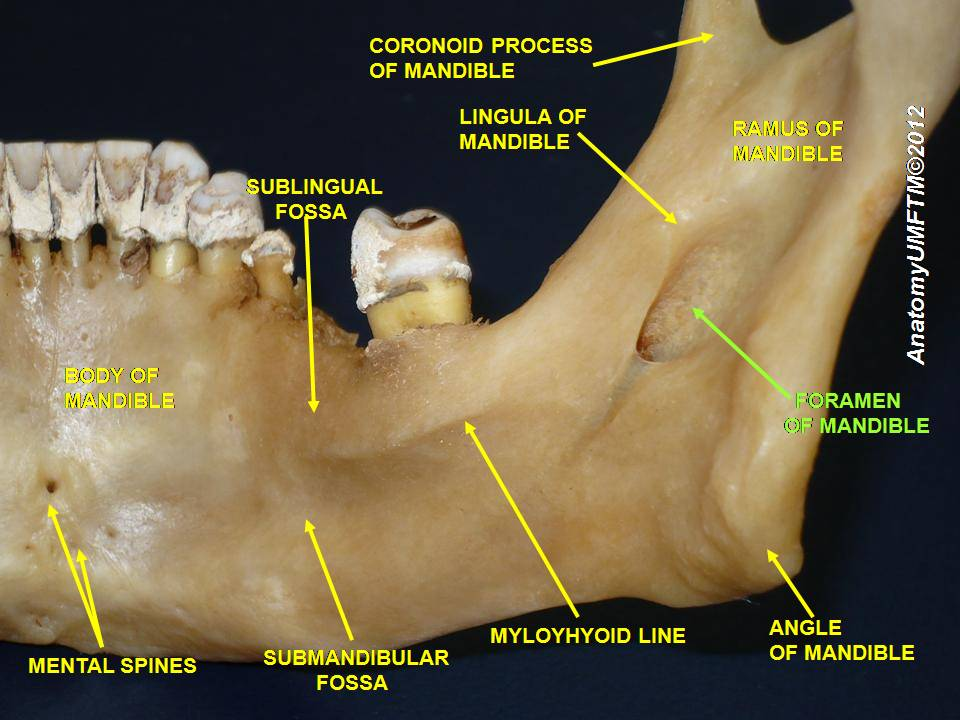
- The mandibular foramen sits in the ramus of the mandible

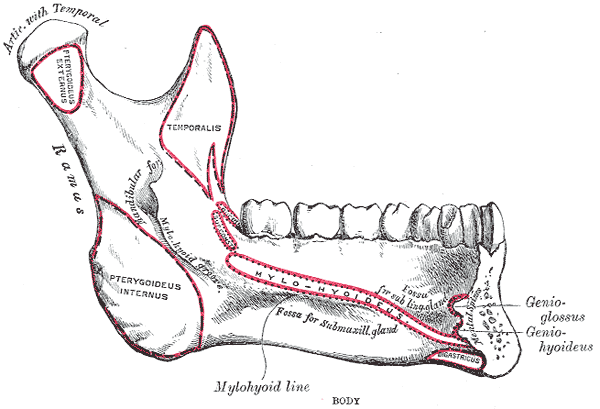
- Mandible viewed from the inner side of the mandible, showing the mandibular foramen at left.

Details
- Part of: Mandible
- System: Skeletal

Identifiers
- Latin: foramen mandibulae
- TA98: A02.1.15.028
- TA2: 865
- FMA: 53172

The mandibular foramen is an opening on the internal surface of the ramus of the mandible. It allows for divisions of the mandibular nerve and blood vessels to pass through.

== Structure ==
The mandibular foramen is an opening on the internal surface of the ramus of the mandible. It allows for divisions of the mandibular nerve and blood vessels to pass through.

=== Variation ===
There are two distinct anatomies to its rim.

- In the common form the rim is V-shaped, with a groove separating the anterior and posterior parts.
- In the horizontal-oval form there is no groove, and the rim is horizontally oriented and oval in shape, the anterior and posterior parts connected.

Rarely, a bifid inferior alveolar nerve may be present, in which case a second mandibular foramen, more inferiorly placed, exists and can be detected by noting a doubled mandibular canal on a radiograph.

== Function ==
The mandibular nerve is one of three branches of the trigeminal nerve, and the only one having motor innervation. One branch of it, the inferior alveolar nerve, as well as the inferior alveolar artery, enter the foramen traveling through the body in the mandibular canal and exit at the mental foramen on the anterior mandible at which point the nerve is known as the mental nerve. These nerves provide sensory innervation to the lower teeth, as well as the lower lip and some skin on the lower face.

== Clinical significance ==
Local anaesthetic can be injected around the mandibular foramen to anaesthetise the mandibular nerve, and thereby the mandible the lower teeth on that side, and some skin on the lower face.

== Other animals ==
The mandibular foramen can be found in other mammals, such as horses.

== Additional images ==
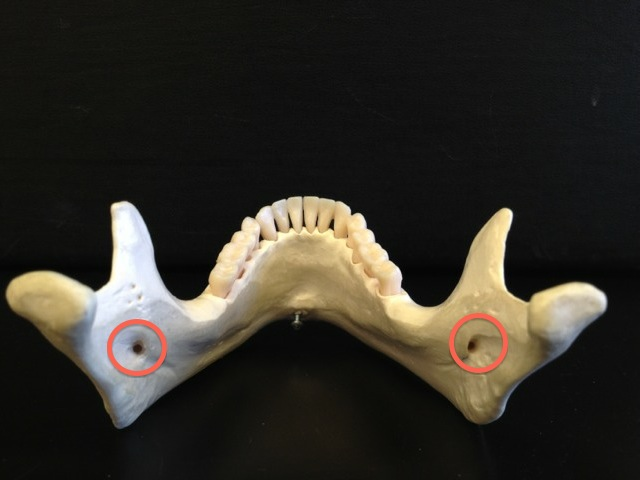
View from behind of the mandibular foramina (red).
