= Lingual foramen =

The small lingual foramen (black "hole" in lower portion of picture) as seen on a periapical radiograph of the anterior mandible.

The lingual foramen is a small midline opening on the posterior aspect of the symphysis of the mandible, just above the mental spine. The lingual foramen gives passage to a single small artery formed by the union of two branches of the sublingual arteries (each sublingual artery contributing a single branch).
