= Mandibular canal =

Passage through the mandible for blood vessels and nerves to the upper teeth

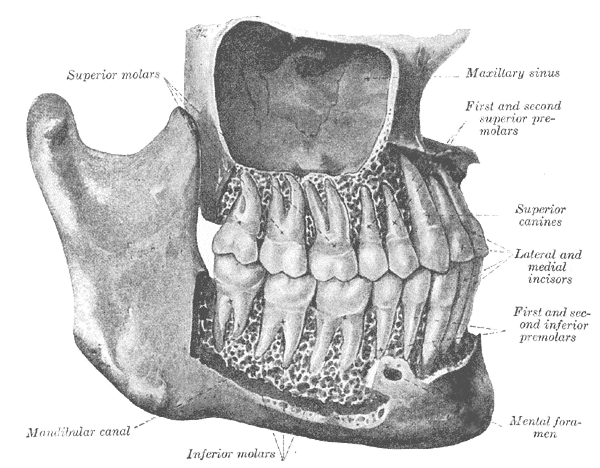
- The permanent teeth, viewed from the right. The external layer of bone has been partly removed and the maxillary sinus has been opened.

Details

Identifiers
- Latin: canalis mandibulae
- MeSH: D000088263
- TA98: A02.1.15.030
- TA2: 867
- FMA: 59473

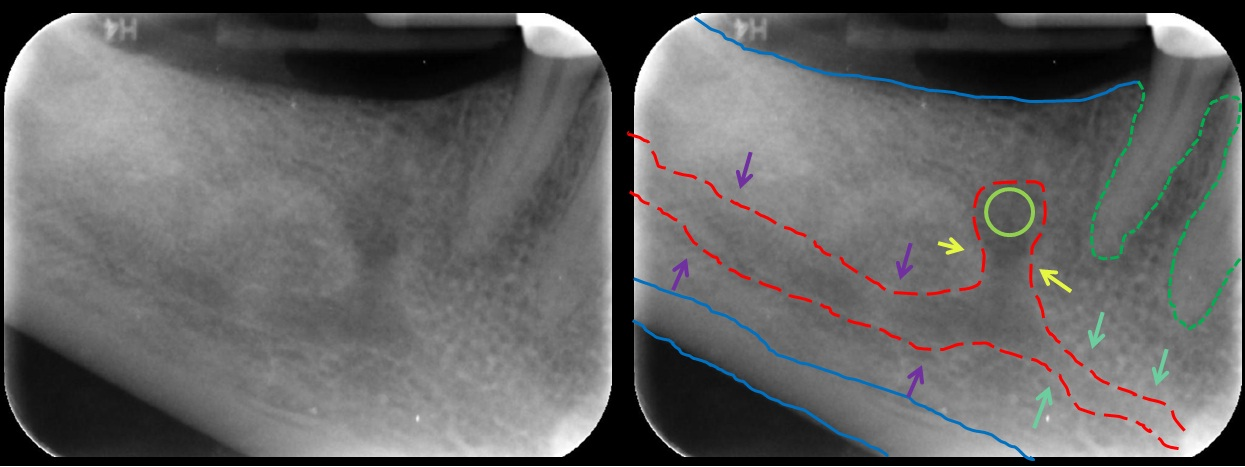
The mandibular incisive canal (indicated here by coral green arrows) continuing anteriorly (to the right) from the mandibular canal (purple arrows) after the mental foramen (light green circle)

In human anatomy, the mandibular canal is a canal within the mandible that contains the inferior alveolar nerve, inferior alveolar artery, and inferior alveolar vein. It runs obliquely downward and forward in the ramus, and then horizontally forward in the body, where it is placed under the alveoli and communicates with them by small openings.

On arriving at the incisor teeth, it turns back to communicate with the mental foramen, giving off a small canal known as the mandibular incisive canal, which run to the cavities containing the incisor teeth. It carries branches of the inferior alveolar nerve and artery.

The mandibular canal is continuous with two foramina: the mental foramen which opens in the mental region of the mandible and carried the distal fibres of the inferior alveolar nerve as the mental nerve; and the mandibular foramen on medial aspect of ramus, into which the mandibular nerve enters to become the inferior alveolar nerve. The mandibular canal often runs close to the apices of the third molar tooth, and the inferior alveolar nerve can become damaged during removal of this tooth, causing sensory disturbance in the distribution of the nerve. This is sometimes the case for the second or first molar teeth, and care must be taken during removal or root canal treatment in such cases to prevent nerve injury or extrusion of root canal filling materials.

== Variations ==
Several variations of the mandibular canal exist with varying frequency. The most common variant is the retromolar canal (~10 % of canals), whereby a branch is given off in the mandibular ramus which terminates in the retromolar region of the mandible. The retromolar canal may cause bleeding during surgery in the retromolar region such as removal of mandibular third molar teeth. Other variants include a bifid canal with a branch (~41%): following the course of the main mandibular canal before re-joining it (forward or buccolingual type); terminating at the apex of a tooth, usually the molar teeth (dental type); opening as an accessory mental foramen. A trifid mandibular canal variation has also been described.

== Additional images ==
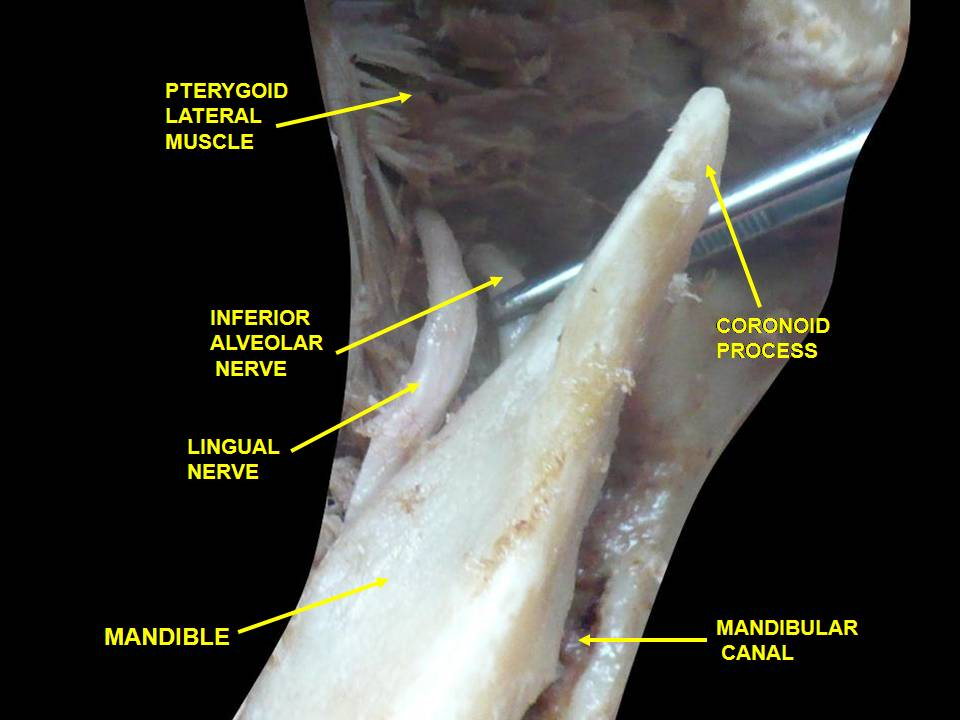
Mandibular nerve and bone. Deep dissection. Anterior view.

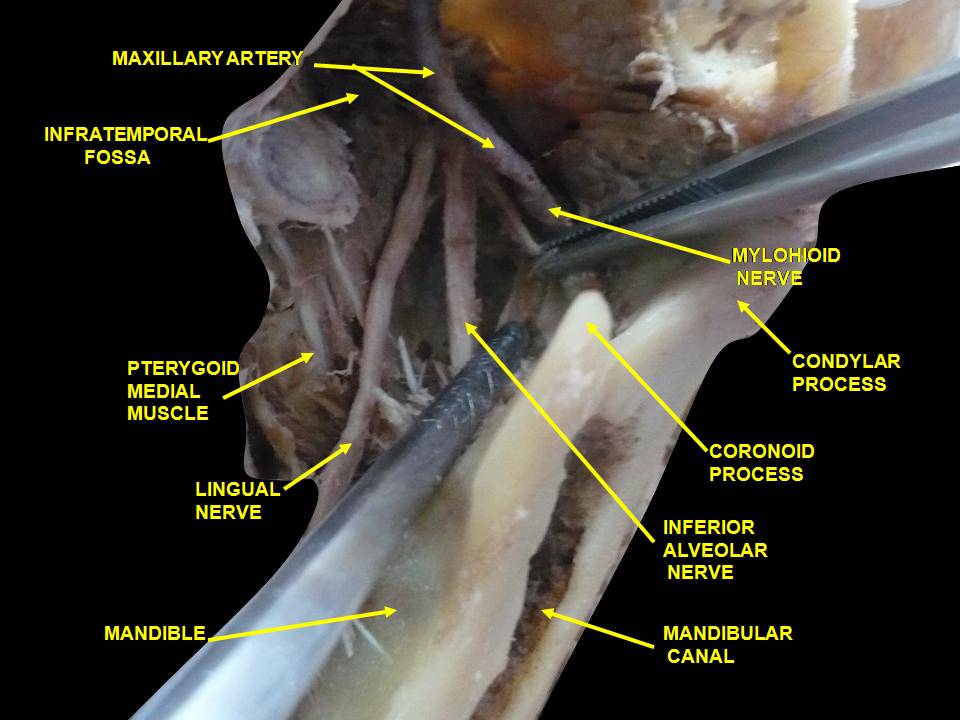
Infratemporal fossa. Lingual and inferior alveolar nerve. Deep dissection. Anterolateral view

== See also ==
- Human mandible
- Inferior alveolar artery
