= Human jaw shrinkage =

Human evolutionary phenomenon

Human jaw shrinkage is the phenomenon of continued size reduction of the human mandible and maxilla over the past 12,000 to 15,000 years. Modern human lifestyles and diets are vastly different now from what they were for most of human evolutionary history. Human jaws, as well as oral cavities, have been shrinking ever since the spread of agriculture during the Neolithic Revolution (c. 12,000 years ago). This has been confirmed by bone remains dated to this time period. Researchers are able to infer the basic lifestyle practices of past cultures, enabling them to link jaw size with lifestyle behaviors. Bones from burial sites of past hunter-gatherer societies are associated with larger jaws and mouths, while bones retrieved from former farming cultures have decreased jaw size.

Bones from farming societies indicate the presence of dental malocclusions, commonly known as non-straight teeth. Within recent centuries, as food has become more processed and soft in form, a rapid increase in non-straight teeth, smaller jaws, and mouths has been observed, as well as decreased space for wisdom teeth, and associated health conditions. Such conditions include sleep apnea, constricted airways, and decreased respiratory fitness. Medical professionals have been making similar observations and documenting them for hundreds of years. Changes in diet, lifestyle, and breathing patterns have led to maladaptive phenotypic expression in terms of morphological craniofacial development that starts in childhood but persists throughout the lifespan.

== Evolutionary history ==
The general trend of jaw and oral cavity shrinkage, as well as dental malocclusion presence, has been observed in burial remains across Eurasia. Analyses of remains from areas thought to be in situ (origin) to agriculture, such as those in the Levant region dated to approximately 12,000 years ago, are thought to be where humans first changed from hunting and gathering to a more agricultural lifestyle, with some populations relying on agriculture more than others. Burial sites ranging from 15,000 years ago to approximately 4,000 years ago, spread throughout Europe and modern-day Turkey, have been determined to be the remains of farmers, hunter-gatherers, transitional farmers, and semi-sedentary hunter-gatherers; comparisons and analyses of dental dimensions and jaw morphology have been made between these four lifestyle practices. Clear morphological differences were found based on lifestyle practice, as the jaws and teeth associated with more farming were shown to be smaller on average and often accompanied with malocclusion. Hunter-gatherer populations overwhelmingly had larger jaws, almost always providing adequate space for teeth, including wisdom teeth, and tongue crowding was rare. Indigenous hunter-gatherer populations living today, such as Aboriginal Australians and the Hadza people of Tanzania, have better oral health and less malocclusion than the average human living in a developed society today. Within Hadza populations, a difference in oral health between males and females has been shown; Hadza women predominantly eat agricultural foods, because they spend most of their time in villages, while the men mostly live in the bush, which consists of hunting, tracking, and gathering. This lifestyle difference causes Hadza men's diets to be dominated by wild foods and leads to them having less periodontal disease, straighter teeth, and fewer cavities than their female counterparts. Even when comparing medieval skulls (approximately 500 to 1,500 years ago) with modern skulls, there is stark contrast in terms of jaw size and malocclusion rates.

Due to the exponential increase in advancement since the Agricultural Revolution 12,000 years ago, humans' immediate environments, diets, and culture have changed dramatically. This short length of time, relative to evolutionary timescale, means human genetics are still essentially the same as before these modern changes in lifestyle practices. Specific human developmental pathways were naturally selected for, over vast periods of time; however, these pathways no longer fully match our current environments, leading to the rise in new pathologies and disease; this is also known as evolutionary mismatch.

== Etiology ==
The main contributing factor to the recent increase in malocclusion is widely considered to be due to a sharp reduction in chewing stress, especially during critical periods of craniofacial growth. Experiments done on non-human subjects have shown that induced nasal blockages and/or dietary changes earlier in life lead to maladaptive morphological change in their jaws, intended to simulate what we are observing globally in human children. Significant craniofacial changes due to diet have even been experimentally shown in pigs during development; researchers fed groups either a hard-consistency diet or a soft-consistency diet, for eight months in total. Drastic differences in jaw and facial musculature, facial structure, and tooth-crowding were observed; researchers directly related the findings to what we are observing more in human populations. Similar soft food experiments were made on rock hyraxes, and squirrel monkeys and showed it caused malocclusion.

=== Breathing mode ===
Orthodontics has also allowed us to identify another contributing factor to shrinking mandibles and overall craniofacial morphological change. An overwhelming proportion of orthodontics patients, who are attempting to correct malocclusion of their teeth, share the characteristic of breathing primarily through the oral cavity. Oftentimes, this habitual mouth breathing is caused by obstructed nasal airways during childhood. Modern humans have spent more time indoors and, as a result, are exposed to higher concentrations of allergens, which accumulate to higher concentrations indoors. Children are experiencing allergies at higher rates, causing congested nasal airways, propagating them to breathe through the mouth more often. Chronic mouth breathing in children has been shown to cause posterior-jaw positioning and more crooked teeth and impacts overall jaw development negatively; These morphological changes further constrict airways, also leaving less room for the tongue to rest, leading to higher rates of obstructive sleep apnea. Decreased mandible size has been directly identified as a risk factor for obstructive sleep apnea. Obstructive sleep apnea in non-obese children has been shown to be a direct result of abnormal oral–facial development, with abnormal development being directly tied to decreased muscle tone of oral and facial muscles. This hypotonia of craniofacial muscles can be caused by lack of chewing stress, jaw posture and rest position, chronic nasal airway obstruction, and even respiratory inefficiency.

Nasal breathing has been shown to be advantageous to mouth breathing due to a number of factors, such as how the nasal cavity humidifies incoming air, easing the burden on the lungs, while also filtering out a majority of incoming debris and dust. Nasal breathing also promotes a slower breathing rate. Reduced breathing rates have been shown to promote improved health and longevity. Children who are confirmed clinically to be mouth breathers often show considerably higher rates of concentration difficulties, craniofacial bone abnormalities, malocclusion, cross-bite, chronic gingivitis, candida infections, and halitosis. Due to increasingly sedentary lifestyles, overall population fitness levels are thought to contribute as well. Due to a lack of respiratory efficiency, people are overbreathing through the mouth, even when performing non-strenuous tasks. Breathing chronically through the mouth causes a change in rest posture for the jaw; over time, this can significantly alter jaw development in children, as well as adults to an extent.

== See also ==
- Neoteny in humans
