= Inferior alveolar artery =

Artery found in the head

- Plan of branches of internal maxillary artery. (Inferior alveolar labeled at bottom center.)

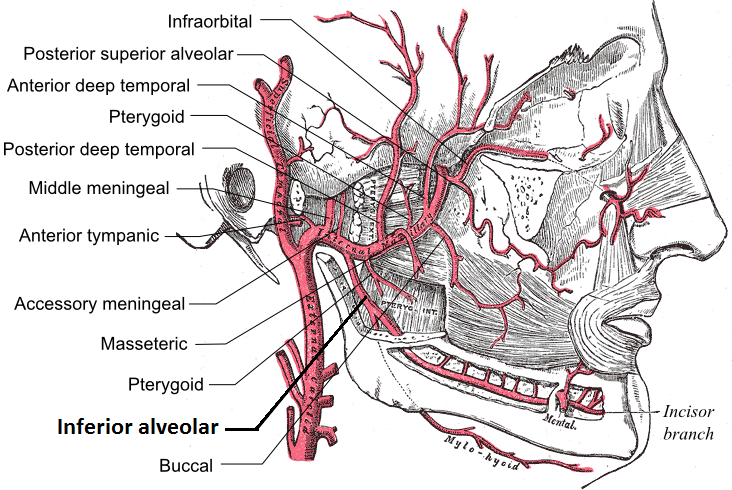
- Plan of branches of the maxillary artery.

Details
- Precursor: Aortic arch 1
- Source: Maxillary artery
- Branches: Incisor branch mental branch lingual branch mylohyoid branch
- Supplies: Dental alveolus

Identifiers
- Latin: arteria alveolaris inferior
- TA98: A12.2.05.056
- TA2: 4426
- FMA: 49695

The inferior alveolar artery (inferior dental artery) is an artery of the head. It is a branch of (the first part of) the maxillary artery. It descends through the infratemporal fossa as part of a neurovascular bundle with the inferior alveolar nerve and vein to the mandibular foramen where it enters and passes anteriorly inside the mandible, supplying the body of mandible and the dental pulp of the lower molar and premolar teeth. Its terminal incisor branch supplies the rest of the lower teeth. Its mental branch exits the mandibula anteriorly through the mental foramen to supply adjacent lip and skin.

== Structure ==
=== Course ===
It passes inferior-ward through the infratemporal fossa as part of a neurovascular bundle with the inferior alveolar nerve and vein to the mandibular foramen. In the infratemporal fossa, it is situated posterior to the inferior alveolar nerve, lateral to the skull, and medial to the sphenomandibular ligament.

It enters the mandibular foramen (of the medial surface of the ramus of the mandible) to come to pass anterior-ward within the mandibular canal alongside the inferior alveolar nerve. Within the canal, it provides arterial supply to the mandibular/lower molar and premolar teeth before splitting into its two terminal branches (incisive branch and mental branch) close to the first premolar.

=== Branches ===
The inferior alveolar artery and its incisor branch during their course through mandibular canal issue a few twigs which are lost in the cancellous tissue, and a series of branches which correspond in number to the number of the roots of the teeth: these enter the minute apertures at the extremities of the roots of the teeth to supply the pulp of the teeth.

==== Lingual branch ====
Near to its origin, the inferior alveolar artery issues a lingual branch which passes inferior-ward alongside the lingual nerve. It provides arterial supply to the mucous membrane of the tongue.

==== Incisor branch ====
The incisor branch is continued anterior-ward inferior to the incisor teeth as far as the midline where it anastomoses with its contralateral partner (sometimes an incisor branch continue across the midline to the other side).

==== Mental branch ====
The mental branch exits the mandibula anteriorly at the mental foramen alongside the mental nerve. It provides arterial supply to the chin, supplying adjacent skin and lip. It forms anastomoses with the submental and inferior labial arteries.

==== Mylohyoid branch ====
The inferior alveolar artery emits the mylohyoid branch before entering the mandibular foramen. The branch pierces the sphenomandibular ligament to come to pass inferior-ward along the mylohyoid groove (which occurs upon the interior surface of the ramus of mandible) accompanied by the mylohyoid nerve. The branch ramifies upon the mylohyoid muscle and provides arterial supply to this muscle. It forms anastomoses with the submental branch of the facial artery.

== Additional images ==
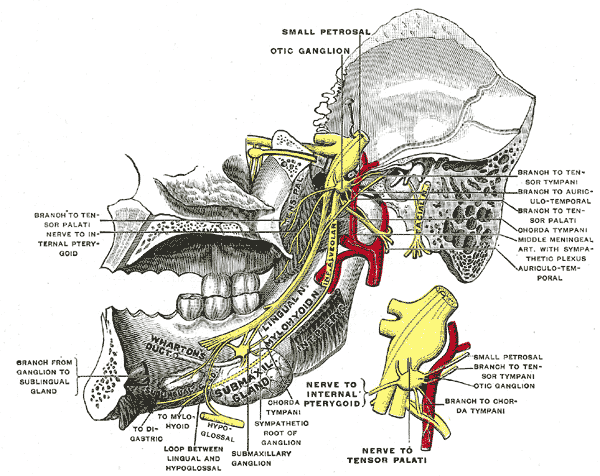
Mandibular division of trigeminal nerve, seen from the middle line.

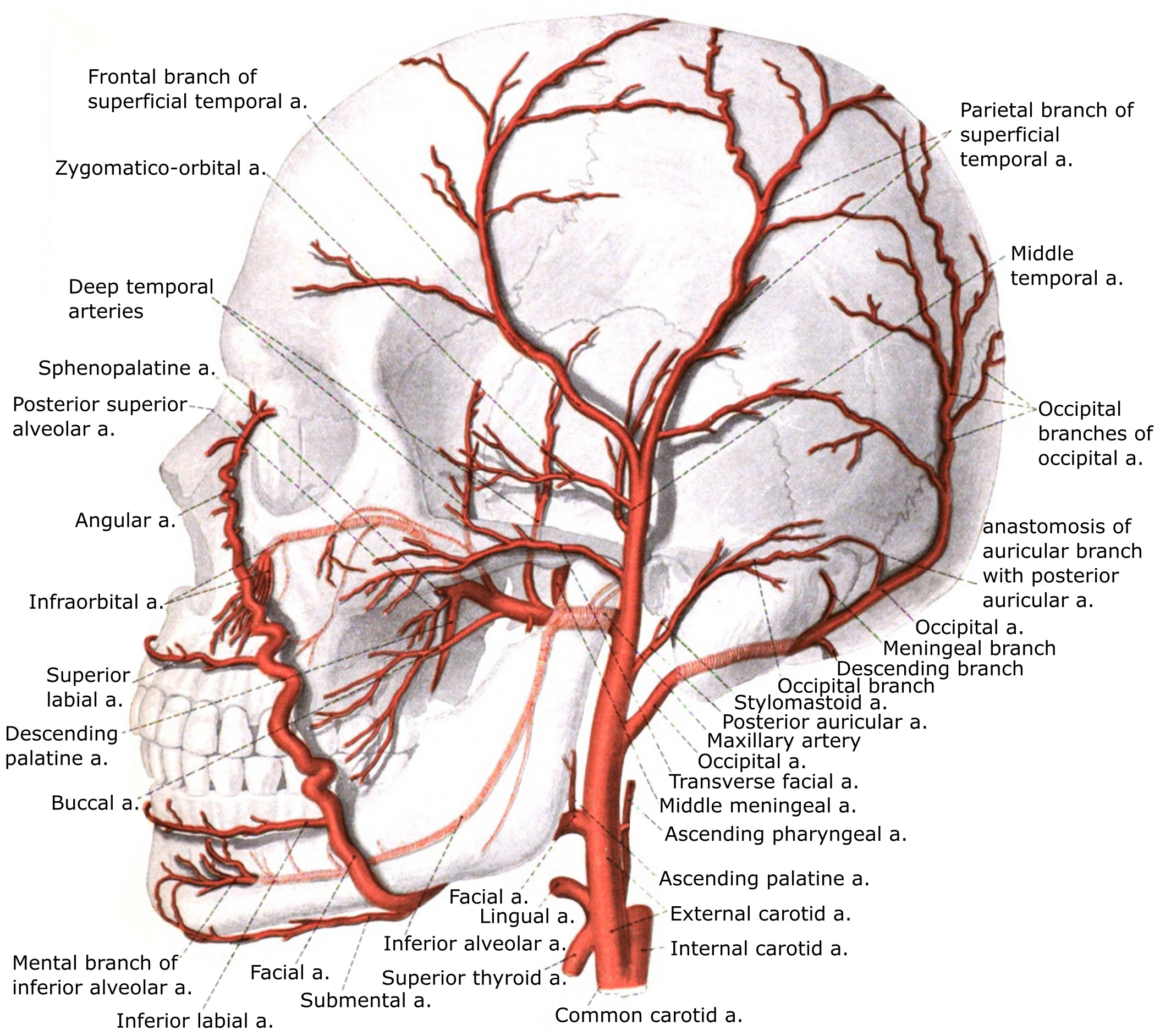
External carotid artery with branches
