= Geniospasm =

- Other names: Hereditary geniospasm
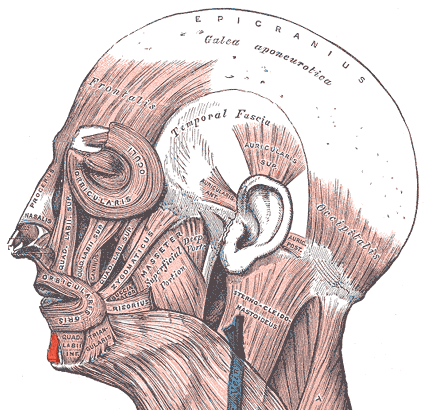
- Mentalis muscle
- Specialty: Neurology

Geniospasm is movement disorder of the mentalis muscle.

It is a benign genetic disorder linked to chromosome 9q13-q21 where there are episodic involuntary up and down movements of the chin and lower lip. The movements consist of rapid fluttering or trembling at about 8 Hz superimposed onto a once per three seconds movement of higher amplitude and occur symmetrically in the V-shaped muscle. The tongue and buccal floor muscles may also be affected but to a much lesser degree.

The movements are always present but extreme episodes may be precipitated by stress, concentration or emotion and commence in early childhood.

The condition is extremely rare and in a study in 1999 only 23 families in the world were known to be affected, although it may be under-reported. Inheritance is aggressively autosomal dominant. In at least two studies the condition appeared spontaneously in the families.

The condition responds very well to regular botulinum toxin injections into the mentalis muscle which paralyse the muscle but cause no impairment of facial expression or speech.
