= Mental tubercle =

Part of the mandible

Details

Identifiers
- Latin: tuberculum mentale mandibulae
- TA98: A02.1.15.006
- TA2: 841
- FMA: 59426

The mandibular symphysis divides below and encloses a triangular eminence, the mental protuberance, the base of which is depressed in the center but raised on either side to form the mental tubercle. The two mental tubercles along with the medial mental protuberance are collectively called the mental trigone.
