= Mandibular symphysis =

Line where two halves of the jaw fuse

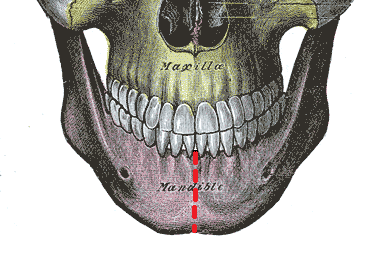
- Anterior view of mandible, showing mandibular symphysis (red broken line)

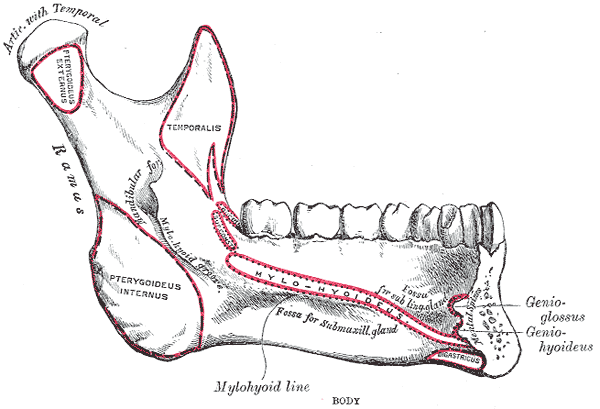
- Medial surface of the left half of the mandible, dis-articulated from the right side at the mandibular symphysis

Details

Identifiers
- Latin: symphysis mandibulae
- TA98: A02.1.15.004
- TA2: 838
- FMA: 75779

In human anatomy, on the facial skeleton of the skull, the external surface of the mandible is marked in the median line by a faint ridge, indicating the mandibular symphysis (Latin: symphysis menti) or line of junction where the two lateral halves of the mandible typically fuse in the first year of life (6–9 months after birth). It is not a true symphysis as there is no cartilage between the two sides of the mandible.

This ridge divides below and encloses a triangular eminence, the mental protuberance, the base of which is depressed in the center but raised on either side to form the mental tubercle. The lowest (most inferior) point of the mandibular symphysis—commonly referred to as the chin—is called the menton.

It serves as the origin for the geniohyoid and the genioglossus muscles.

== Other animals ==
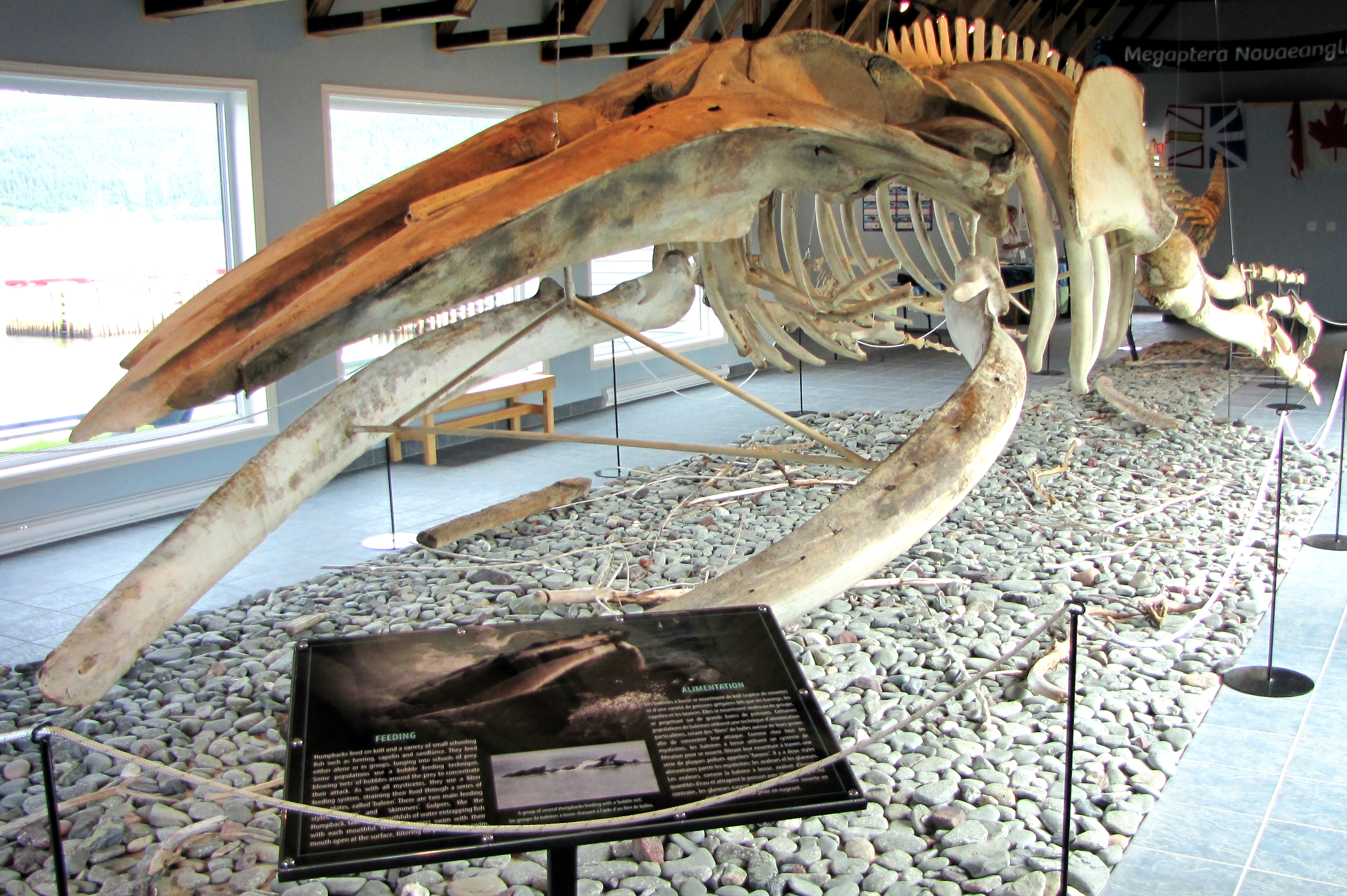
Humpback skeleton showing the flexible "slingshot" symphysis present in baleen whales

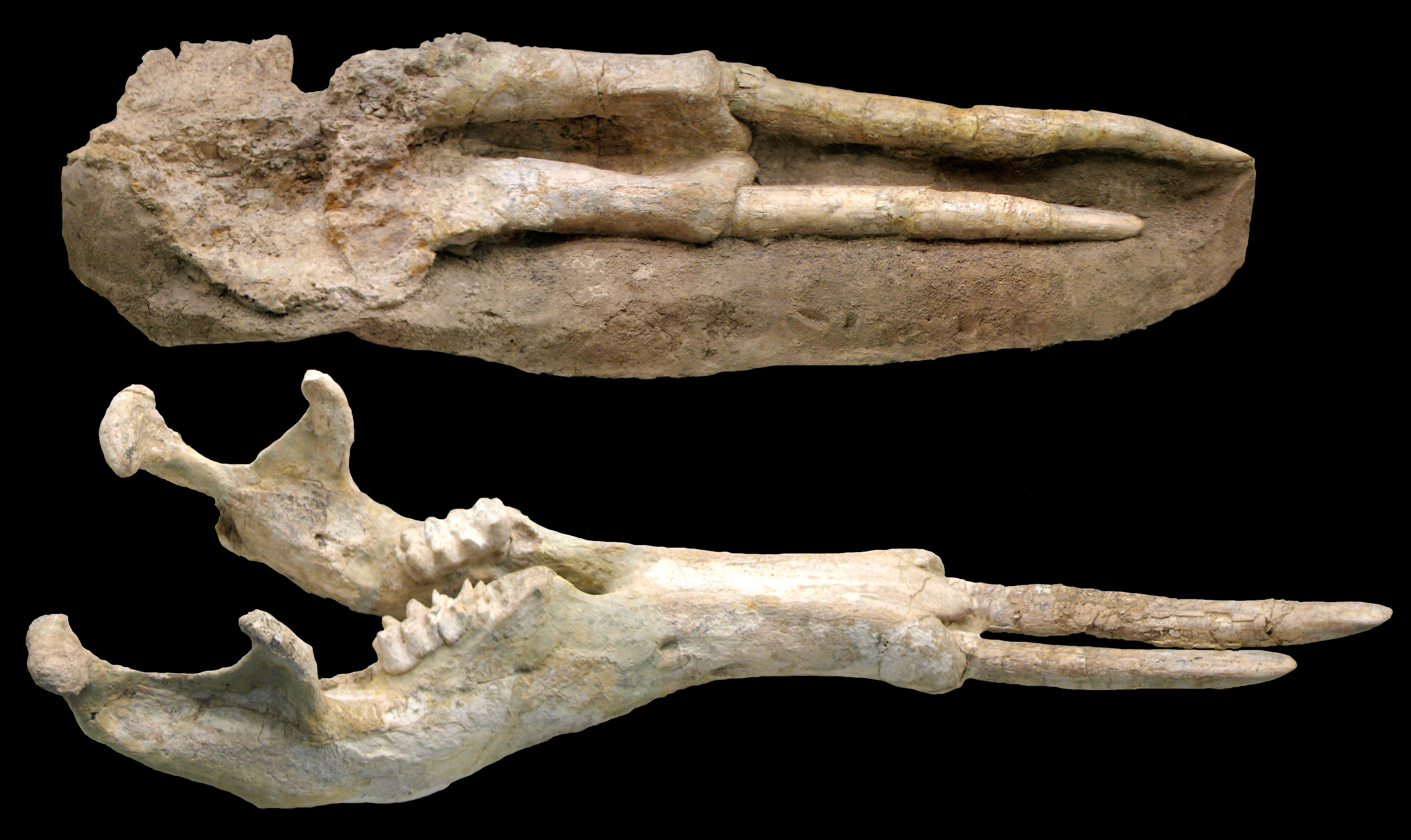
Skull and jaws of the "tetralophodont gomphothere" Tetralophodon longirostris, a proboscidean demonstrating mandibular symphysis elongation

Solitary mammalian carnivores that rely on a powerful canine bite to subdue their prey have a strong mandibular symphysis, while pack hunters delivering shallow bites have a weaker one. When filter feeding, the baleen whales, of the suborder Mysticeti, can dynamically expand their oral cavity in order to accommodate enormous volumes of sea water. This is made possible thanks to its mandibular skull joints, especially the elastic mandibular symphysis which permits both dentaries to be rotated independently in two planes. This flexible jaw, which made the titanic body sizes of baleen whales possible, is not present in early whales and most likely evolved within Mysticeti.

Many primitive proboscideans belonging to the group Elephantiformes have a greatly elongated mandibular symphysis. This was lost in many later groups, including modern elephants.
