= Mental protuberance =

Eminence of the mandible

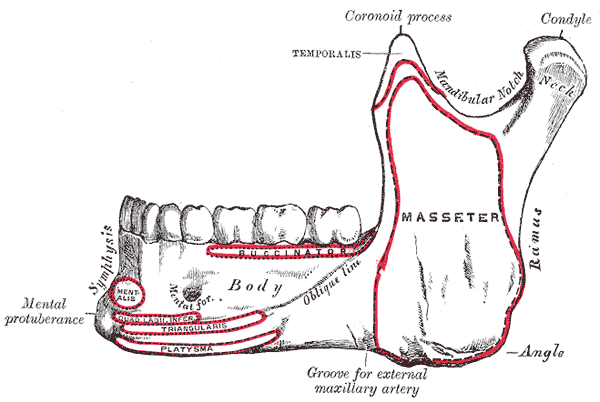
- Mandible. Outer surface. Side view. (Mental protuberance labeled at bottom left.)

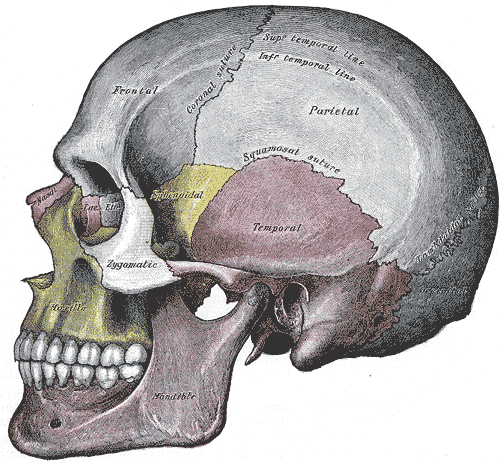
- Side view of the skull. (Mental protuberance visible but not labeled.)

Details

Identifiers
- Latin: protuberantia mentalis
- TA98: A02.1.15.005
- TA2: 840
- FMA: 59430

The symphysis of the external surface of the mandible divides below and encloses a triangular eminence, the mental protuberance, the base of which is depressed in the center but raised on either side to form the mental tubercle. The size and shape of the bones making up this structure are responsible for the size and shape of a person's chin. Synonyms of mental protuberance include mental process and protuberantia mentalis. Mental in this sense derives from Latin mentum (chin), not mens (mind), source of the more common meaning of mental.
