= Mental foramen =

Anatomical feature of the jawbone

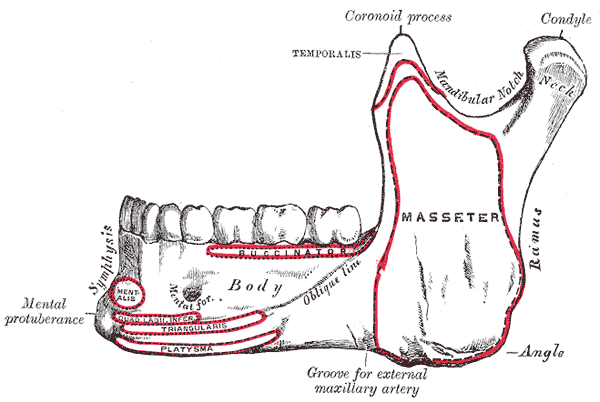
- Mandible. Outer surface. Side view. (Mental foramen visible at left.)

Details
- Part of: Mandible

Identifiers
- Latin: foramen mentale
- MeSH: D000080383
- TA98: A02.1.15.007
- TA2: 845
- FMA: 53171

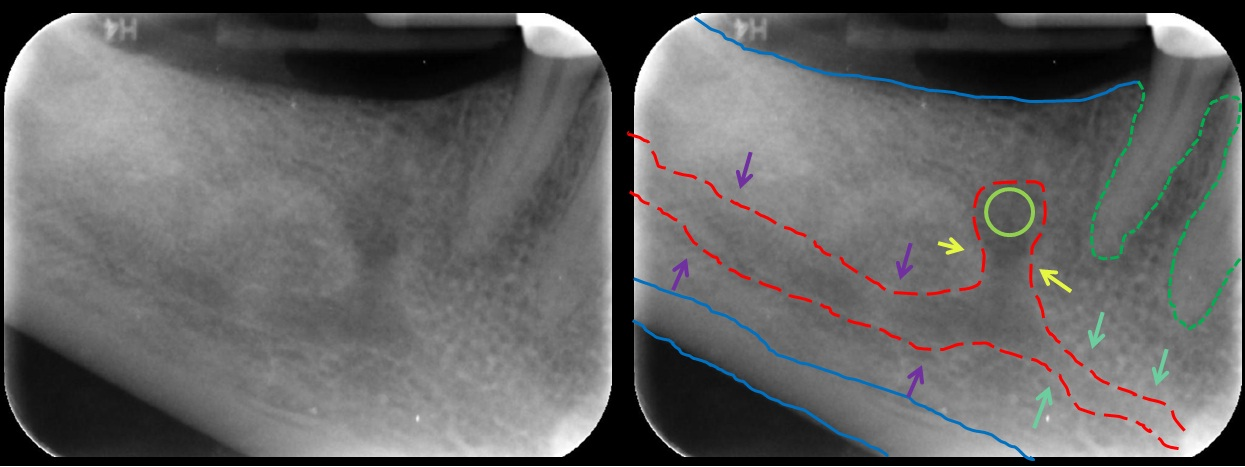
The mandibular incisive canal (indicated here by coral green arrows) continuing anteriorly (to the right) from the mandibular canal (purple arrows) after the mental foramen (light green circle).

The mental foramen is one of two foramina (openings) located on the anterior surface of the mandible. It is part of the mandibular canal. It transmits the terminal branches of the inferior alveolar nerve and the mental vessels.

== Structure ==
The mental foramen is located on the anterior surface of the mandible. It is directly below the commissure of the lips, and the tendon of depressor labii inferioris muscle. It is at the end of the mandibular canal, which begins at the mandibular foramen on the posterior surface of the mandible. It transmits the terminal branches of the inferior alveolar nerve (the mental nerve), the mental artery, and the mental vein.

=== Variation ===
The mental foramen descends slightly in toothless individuals.

The mental foramen is in line with the longitudinal axis of the second premolar in 63% of people. It generally lies at the level of the vestibular fornix and about a finger's breadth above the inferior border of the mandible.

In the general population, 17% of mandibles have an additional mental foramen or foramina on at least one side, while 4% of the mandibles show multiple mental foramina on both sides. Most are unequal in size, often with a single large foramen while any others are smaller. An incisive mental foramen is observed in 1% of the side of the mandible.

== Clinical significance ==
The mental nerve may be anaesthetized as it leaves the mental foramen. This causes loss of sensation to the lower lip and chin on the same side.

== Additional images ==
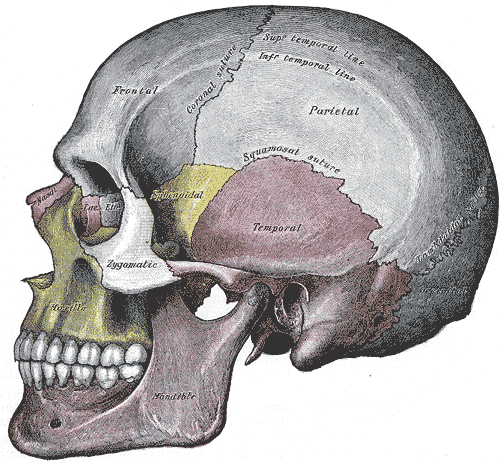
Side view of the skull.

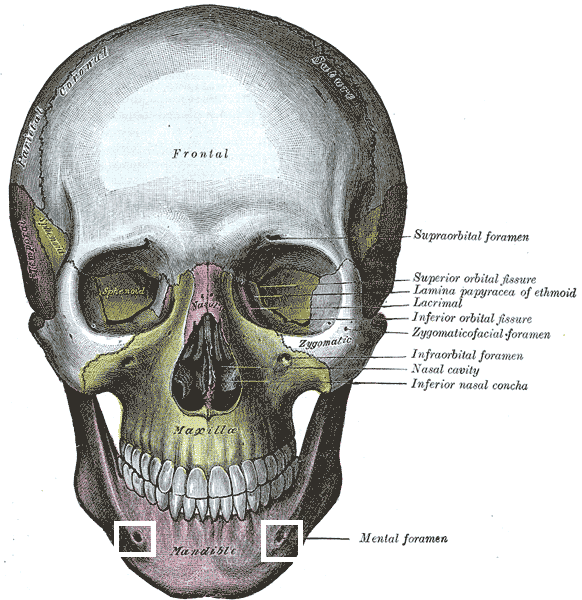
The skull from the front.

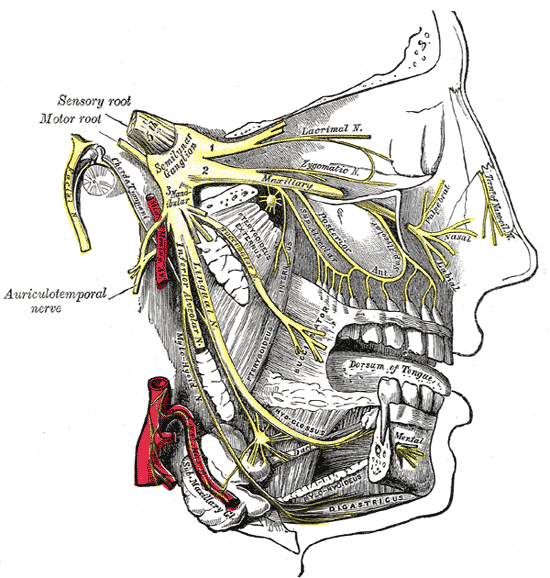
Distribution of the maxillary and mandibular nerves, and the submaxillary ganglion.

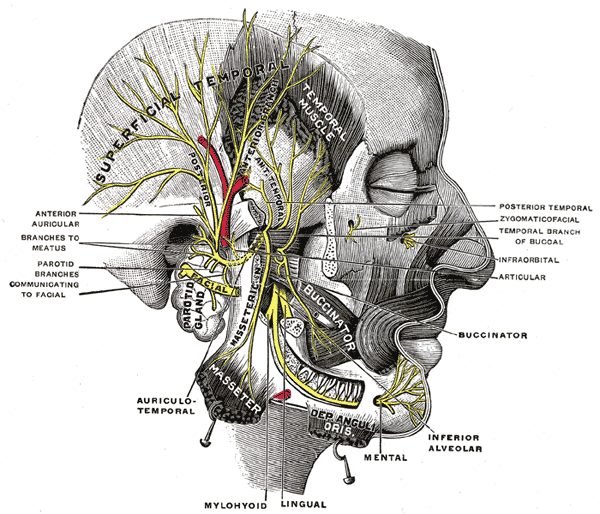
Mandibular division of the trifacial nerve.

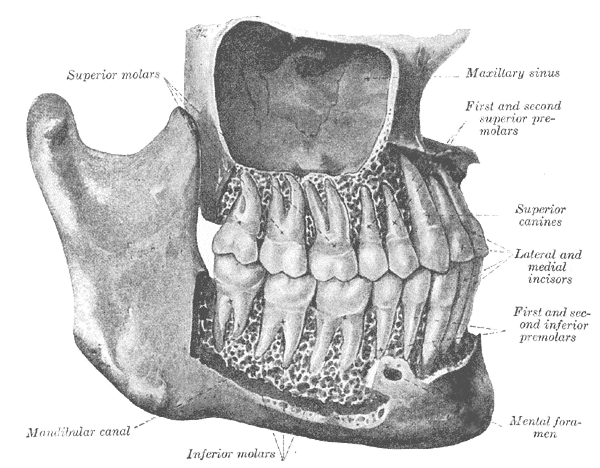
The permanent teeth, viewed from the right.

== See also ==
- Mandibular foramen
