= Mandible =

Lower jaw bone

- Position of the mandible in a 3D model of a human skull

Details
- Precursor: First pharyngeal arch

Identifiers
- Latin: mandibula
- MeSH: D008334

In jawed vertebrates, the mandible (from the Latin mandibula, 'for chewing'), lower jaw, or jawbone is a bone that makes up the lower – and typically more mobile – component of the mouth (the upper jaw being known as the maxilla).

In humans, the jawbone is the skull's only movable, posable bone, sharing joints with the cranium's temporal bones. The mandible hosts the lower teeth (their depth delineated by the alveolar process). Many muscles attach to the bone, which also hosts nerves (some connecting to the teeth) and blood vessels. Amongst other functions, the jawbone is essential for chewing food. Some vertebrates have unfused left and right sides of the mandible (each side being a hemimandible), while others (including humans) fuse the two sides at the chin.

Owing to the Neolithic advent of agriculture (c. 10,000 BCE), human jaws evolved to be smaller. Although it is the strongest bone of the facial skeleton, the mandible tends to deform in old age; it is also subject to fracturing. Surgery allows for the removal of jawbone fragments (or its entirety) as well as regenerative methods. Additionally, the bone is of great forensic significance.

== Structure ==
In humans, the mandible is the largest and lowest bone in the facial skeleton. It is the only movable bone of the skull (discounting the vibrating ossicles of the middle ear). It is connected to the skull's temporal bones by the temporomandibular joints. In addition to simply opening and closing, the jawbone can articulate side to side as well as forward and back.

=== Components ===
The mandible consists of:

- The body, curving anteriorly like a horseshoe
- Two rami (Latin: branch), rising from the posterior body, forming the (nearly square) angle of the mandible
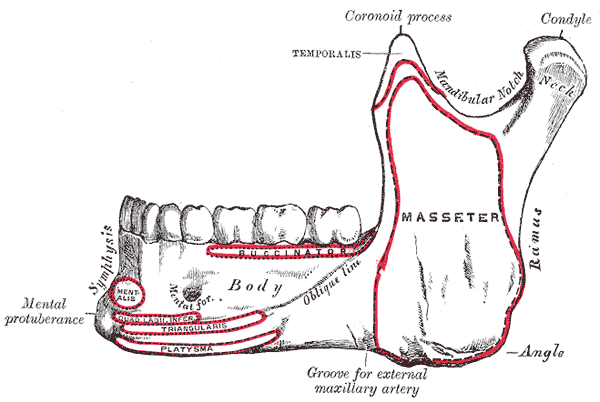
Left side, lateral view (further from spine)

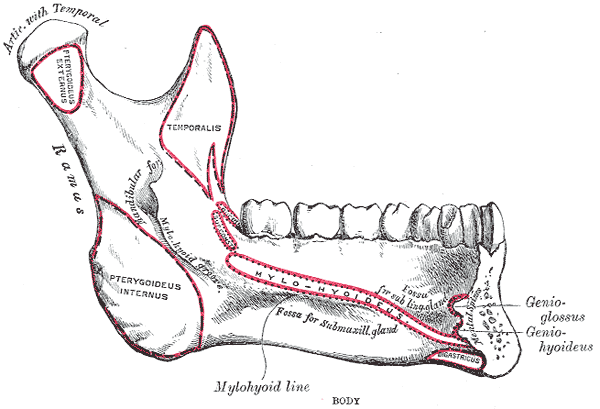
Left side, medial view (closer to spine)

==== Body ====
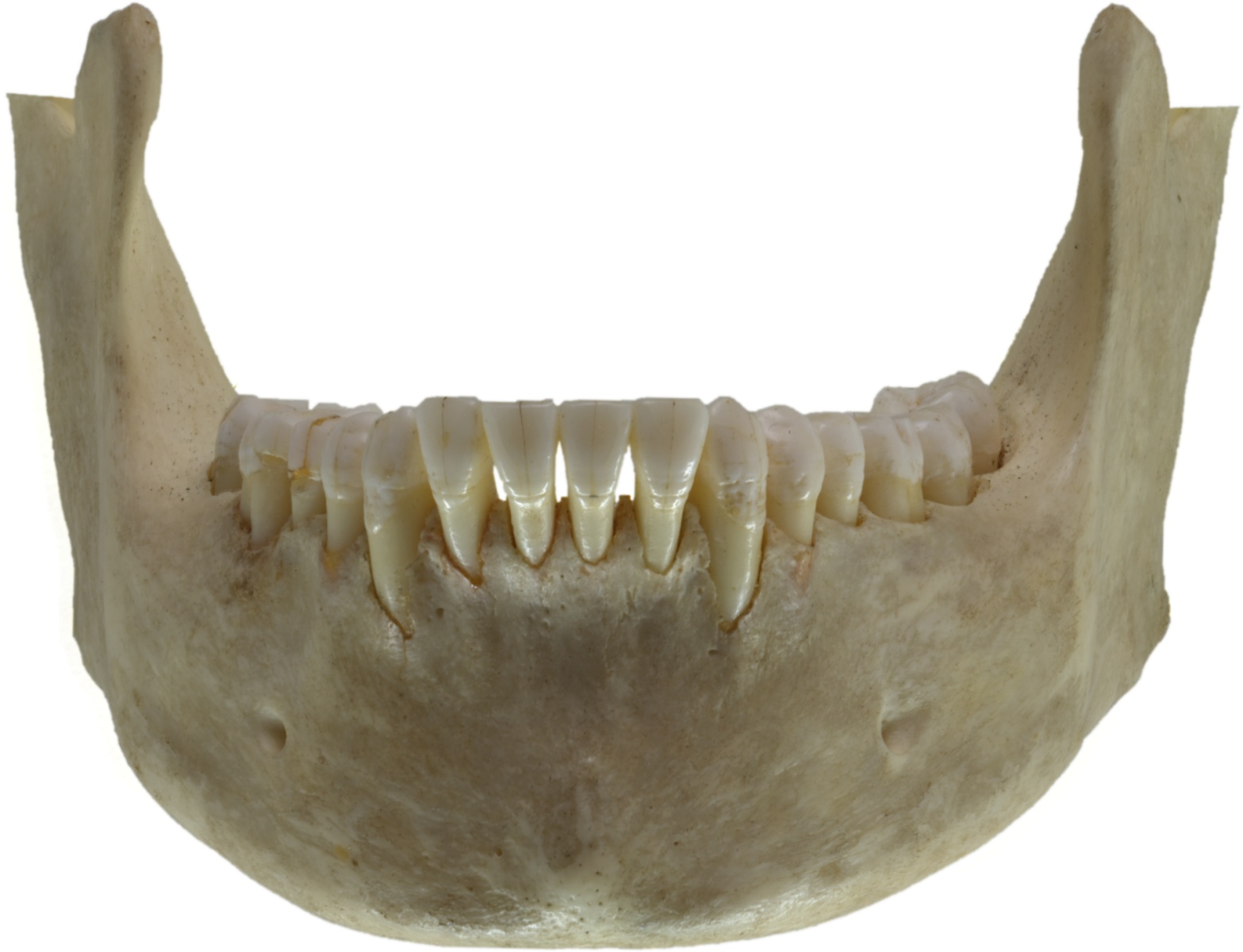
Front view

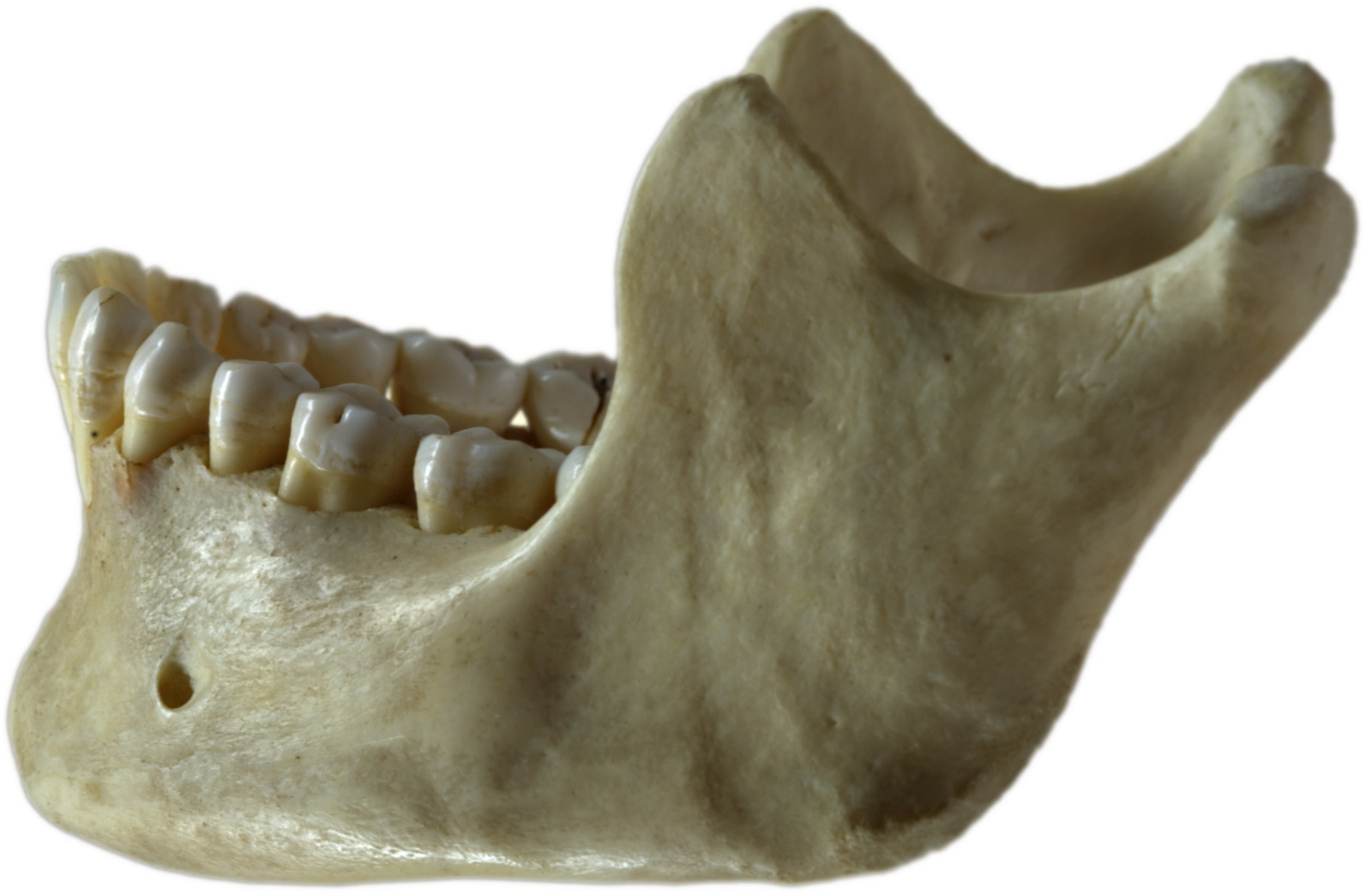
Left side

The body of the mandible is curved, and the front part gives structure to the chin. It has two surfaces and two borders. From the outside, the mandible is marked in the midline by a faint ridge, indicating the mandibular symphysis, the line of junction of the two halves of the mandible. This ridge divides below and encloses a triangular eminence, the mental protuberance (the chin), the base of which is depressed in the center but raised on both sides to form the mental tubercle. Just above this, on both sides, the mentalis muscles attach to a depression called the incisive foramen. Vertically midway on either side of the body, below the second premolar tooth, is the mental foramen, through which the mental nerve and blood vessels pass. Running backward and upward from each mental tubercle is a faint ridge, the oblique line, which is continuous with the anterior border of the ramus. Attached to this ridge is the masseter muscle (which covers most of the ramus and is a muscle of mastication), the depressor labii inferioris and depressor anguli oris (which support the mouth), and the platysma (extending down over much of the neck).

From the inside, the mandible appears concave. On either side of the lower symphysis is the mental spine (which can be faint or fused into one), to which the genioglossus (the inferior muscle of the tongue) attaches; the geniohyoid muscle attaches to the lower mental spine. Above the mental spine, a median foramen and furrow can line the symphysis. Below the mental spine is an oval depression (the digastric fossa of the mandible) where the digastric muscle attaches. Extending backward and upward on either side from the lower symphysis is a ridge called the mylohyoid line, where the mylohyoid muscle attaches; a small part of the superior pharyngeal constrictor muscle attaches to the posterior ridge, near the alveolar margin. Above the anterior ridge, the sublingual gland rests against a smooth triangular area, and below the posterior ridge, the submandibular gland rests in an oval depression.

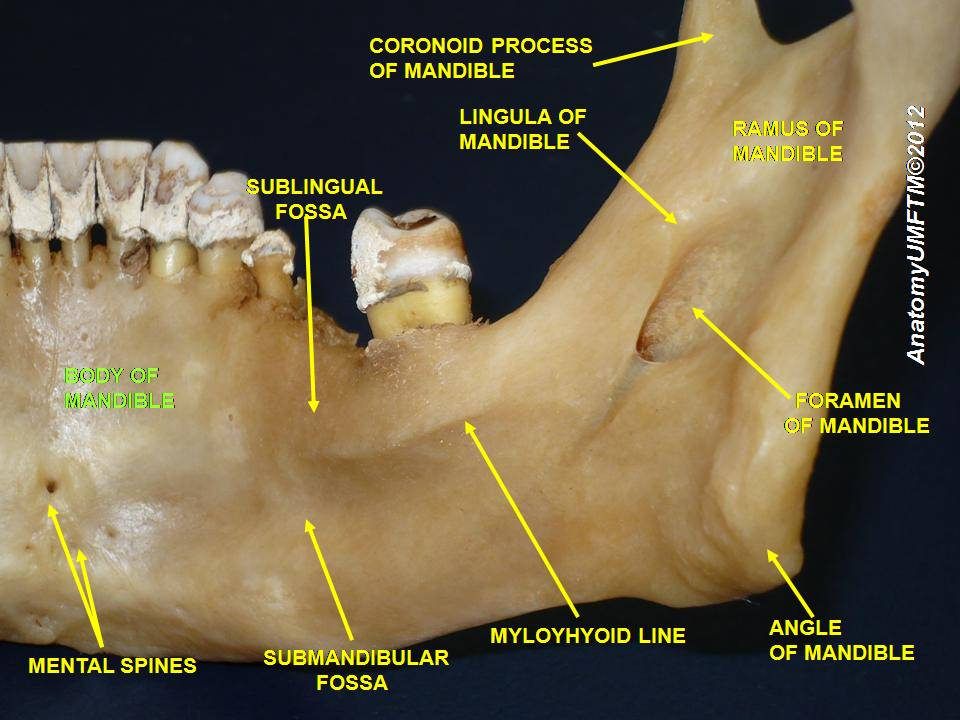
Medial surface of the right body and ramus, the latter penetrated by the mandibular foramen (right)

===== Borders =====
- The superior or alveolar border is narrower at the curved front than behind. It is hollowed into 16 dental alveoli (tooth sockets) of varying depth and size. To the outer lip of the superior border, on either side, the bucinator muscle is attached as far forward as the first molar.
- The inferior border is rounded, longer than the superior, and thicker in front than behind; at the point where it joins the lower border of the ramus is the antegonial notch, where the mylohyoid branch of the inferior alveolar artery exits.

==== Ramus ====
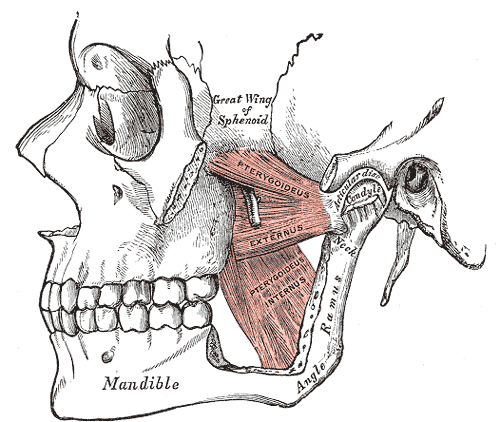
The medial and lateral pterygoid muscles attach to the ramus (partly cut away, along with the cheekbone).

The ramus of the human mandible has four sides, two surfaces, four borders, and two processes. On the outside, the ramus is flat and marked by oblique ridges at its lower part. It gives attachment throughout nearly the whole of its extent to the masseter muscle.

On the inside at the center there is an oblique mandibular foramen, for the entrance of the inferior alveolar nerve and vessels. The margin of this opening is irregular; it presents in front a prominent ridge, surmounted by a sharp spine, the lingula of the mandible, which gives attachment to the sphenomandibular ligament; at its lower and back part is a notch from which the mylohyoid groove runs obliquely downward and forward, and lodges the mylohyoid vessels and nerve. Behind this groove is a rough surface, for the insertion of the medial pterygoid muscle. The mandibular canal runs obliquely downward and forward in the ramus, and then horizontally forward in the body, where it is placed under the alveoli, with small openings for nerves. On arriving at the incisor teeth, it turns back to communicate with the mental foramen, giving off two small canals which run to the cavities containing the incisor teeth. In the posterior two-thirds of the bone the canal is situated nearer the internal surface of the mandible; and in the anterior third, nearer its external surface. It contains the inferior alveolar vessels and nerve, from which branches are distributed to the teeth.

===== Borders =====
- The lower border of the ramus is thick, straight, and continuous with the inferior border of the body of the bone. At its junction with the posterior border is the angle of the mandible, which may be either inverted or everted and is marked by rough, oblique ridges on each side, for the attachment of the masseter laterally, and the medial pterygoid muscle medially; the stylomandibular ligament is attached to the angle between these muscles. The anterior border is thin above, thicker below, and continuous with the oblique line.
- The region where the lower border meets the posterior border is the angle of the mandible.
- The posterior border is thick, smooth, rounded, and covered by the parotid gland. The upper border is thin, and is surmounted by two processes, the coronoid in front and the condyloid behind, separated by a deep concavity, the mandibular notch.

===== Processes =====
- The coronoid process is a thin, triangular eminence, which is flattened from side to side and varies in shape and size.
- The condyloid process is thicker than the coronoid, and consists of two portions: the mandibular condyle, and the constricted portion which supports it, the neck. The condyle is the most superior part of the mandible and is part of the temporomandibular joint.
- The mandibular notch, separating the two processes, is a deep semilunar depression and is crossed by the masseteric vessels and nerve.

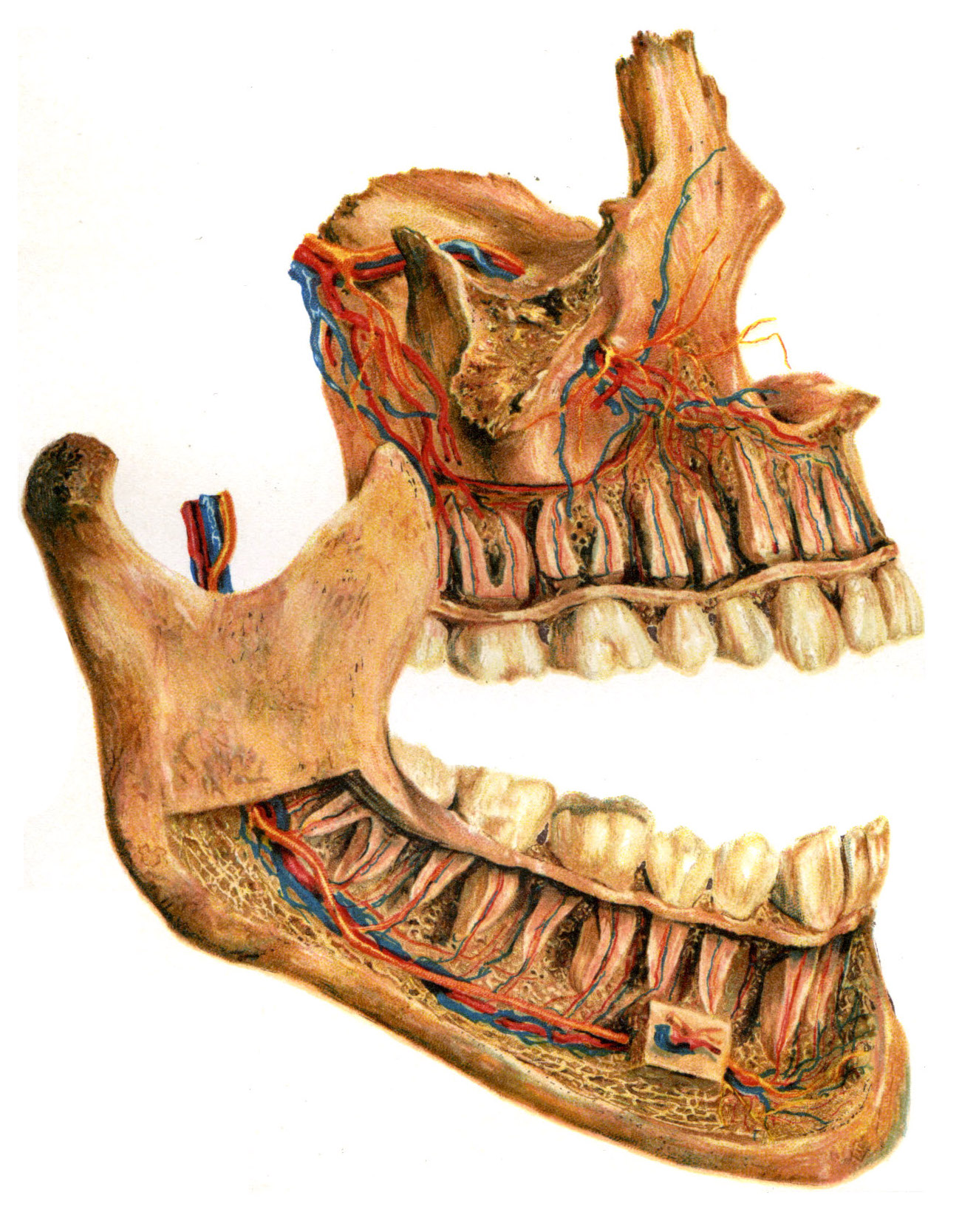
German illustration with jawbones cut away to show the inferior alveolar nerve branching to the mandible's dental alveoli and passing through the mental foramen

=== Foramina ===
The mandible has two main holes (foramina), found on both its left and right sides:

- The mandibular foramen, is above the mandibular angle in the middle of each ramus.
- The mental foramen sits on either side of the mental protuberance (chin) on the body of mandible, usually inferior to the apices of the mandibular first and second premolars. As mandibular growth proceeds in young children, the mental foramen alters in direction of its opening from anterior to posterosuperior. The mental foramen allows the entrance of the mental nerve and blood vessels into the mandibular canal.

=== Nerves ===
The inferior alveolar nerve (IAN), a branch of the mandibular nerve (itself a major division of the cranium's trigeminal nerve), enters the mandibular foramen and runs forward in the mandibular canal, supplying sensation to the gums and teeth. Before passing through the mental foramen, the nerve divides into two terminal branches: incisive and mental nerves. The incisive nerve runs forward in the mandible and supplies the anterior teeth. The mental nerve exits the mental foramen and supplies sensation to the chin and lower lip.

=== Variation ===
Males generally have squarer, stronger, and larger mandibles than females. The mental protuberance is more pronounced in males but can be visualized and palpated in females. Rarely, a bifid IAN may be present, resulting in a second and more inferiorly placed mandibular foramen. This can be detected by noting a doubled mandibular canal via radiograph.

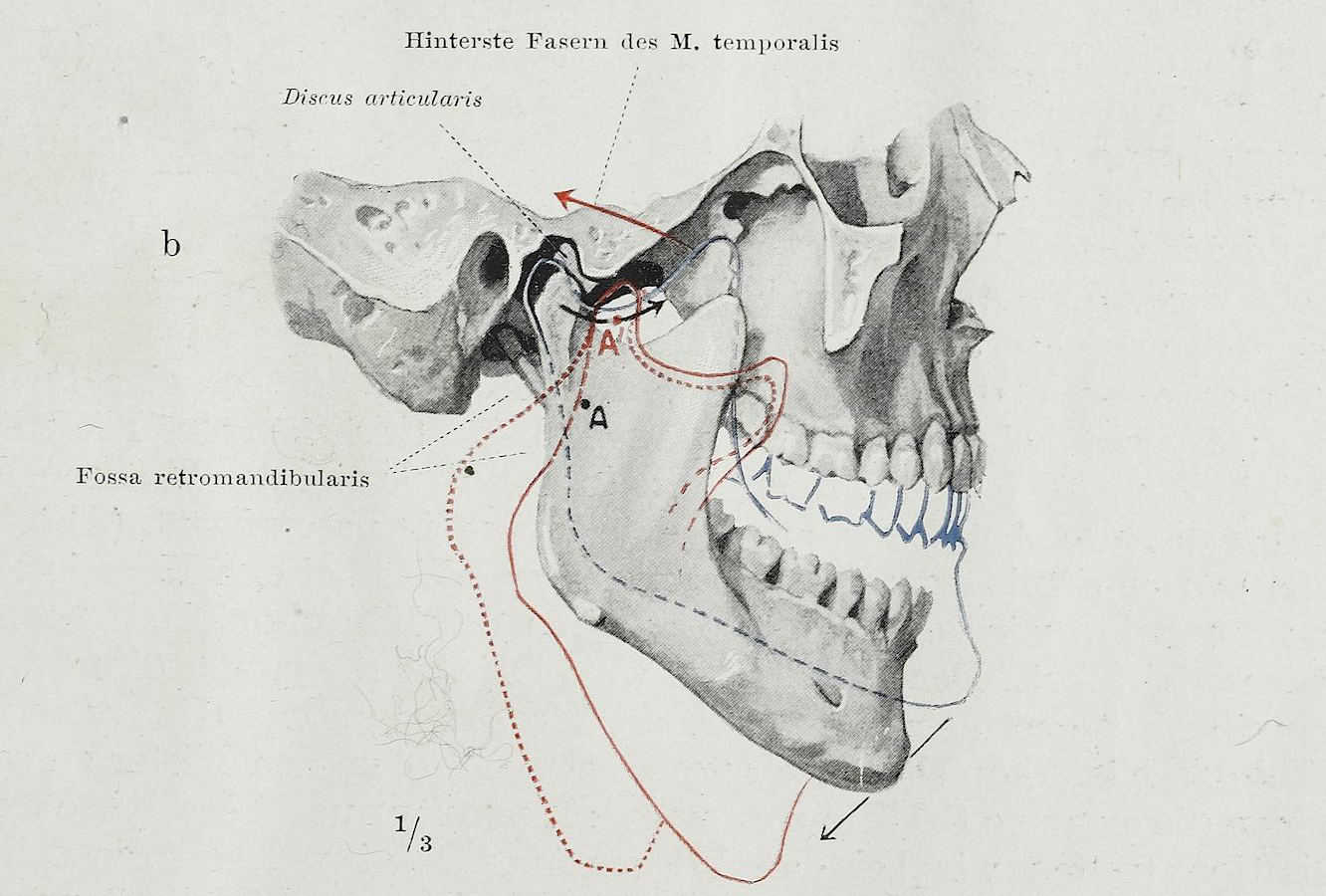
Illustration showing jaw's basic range of motion

== Function ==
The mandible forms the lower jaw and holds the lower teeth in place. It articulates with the left and right temporal bones at the temporomandibular joints. The condyloid process, the superior (upper) and posterior projection from the ramus, makes the temporomandibular joint with the temporal bone. The coronoid process, superior and anterior projection from the ramus. This provides attachment to the temporal muscle.

Teeth sit in the upper part of the body of the mandible. The frontmost part of teeth is more narrow and holds front teeth. The back part holds wider and flatter (albeit grooved) teeth primarily for chewing food. The word mandible derives from the Latin word mandibula 'jawbone' (literally, 'used for chewing'), from mandere 'to chew' and -bula (instrumental suffix). In addition to mastication, the joint of the jawbone enables actions such speech and yawning, while playing a more subtle role in activities such as kissing and breathing.

== Phylogeny ==
The mandible of vertebrates evolved from Meckel's cartilage, left and right segments of cartilage which supported the anterior branchial arch in early fish. Fish jaws surface in species of the large arthrodire genus Dunkleosteus (fl. 382–358 million years ago), which crushed prey with their quickly articulating mouths. The lower jaw of cartilaginous fish, such as sharks, is composed of a cartilagenous structure homologous with Meckel's cartilage. This also remains a significant element of the jaw in some primitive bony fish, such as sturgeons. In reptiles, Meckel's cartilage ossifies into the (multiple) bones of the lower jaw, while mammals of the Cretaceous (145–66 Mya) had both Meckel's cartilage and a mandible.

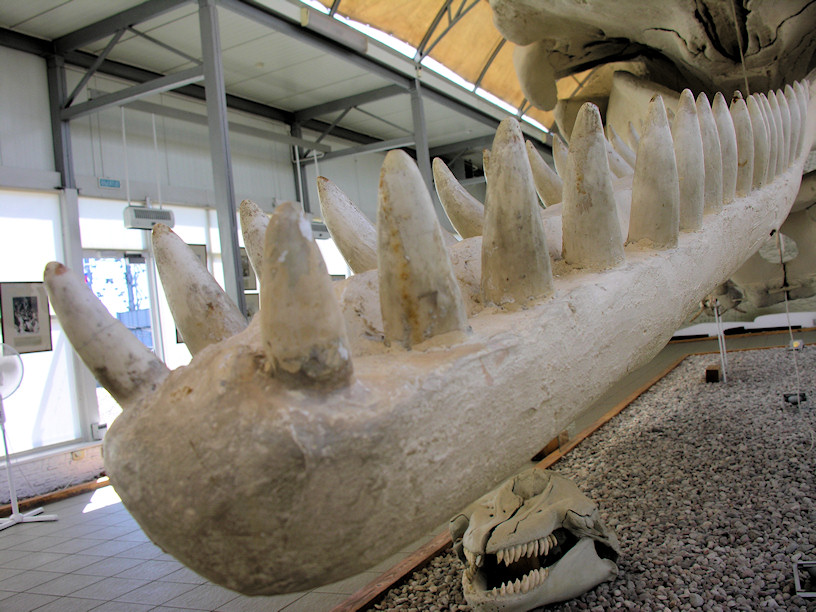
Sperm whale mandible

In lobe-finned fishes and the early fossil tetrapods, the bone homologous to the mandible of mammals is merely the largest of several bones in the lower jaw. In such animals, it is referred to as the dentary bone or os dentale, and forms the body of the outer surface of the jaw. It is bordered below by a number of splenial bones, while the angle of the jaw is formed by a lower angular bone and a suprangular bone just above it. The inner surface of the jaw is lined by a prearticular bone, while the articular bone forms the articulation with the skull proper. A set of three narrow coronoid bones lie above the prearticular bone. As the name implies, the majority of the teeth are attached to the dentary, but there are commonly also teeth on the coronoid bones, and sometimes on the prearticular.

Most vertebrates exhibit a simpler scheme, as bones have either fused or vanished. In teleosts, only the dentary, articular, and angular bones remain, while in living amphibians, the dentary is accompanied only by the prearticular, and, in salamanders, one of the coronoids. The lower jaw of reptiles has only a single coronoid and splenial, but retains all the other primitive bones except the prearticular and the periosteum. In birds, the various bones have fused into a single structure. In mammals, most have disappeared, leaving only the mandible. As a result, there is only articulation between the mandible and temporal bones, as opposed to articulation between articular and quadrate bones. An intermediate stage can be seen in some therapsids, in which both points of articulation are present. Aside from the dentary, only few other bones of the lower jaw remain in mammals; the former articular and quadrate bones survive as the malleus and the incus of the middle ear.

In paleontology, domestic dog bones can be identified via a generally smaller mandible compared to that of the wolf. In recent human evolution, both the oral cavity and jaws have shrunk in correspondence with the Neolithic-era shift from hunter-gatherer lifestyles towards agriculture and settlement, dated to c. 10,000 BCE. This has led to orthodontic malocclusions.

Gallery
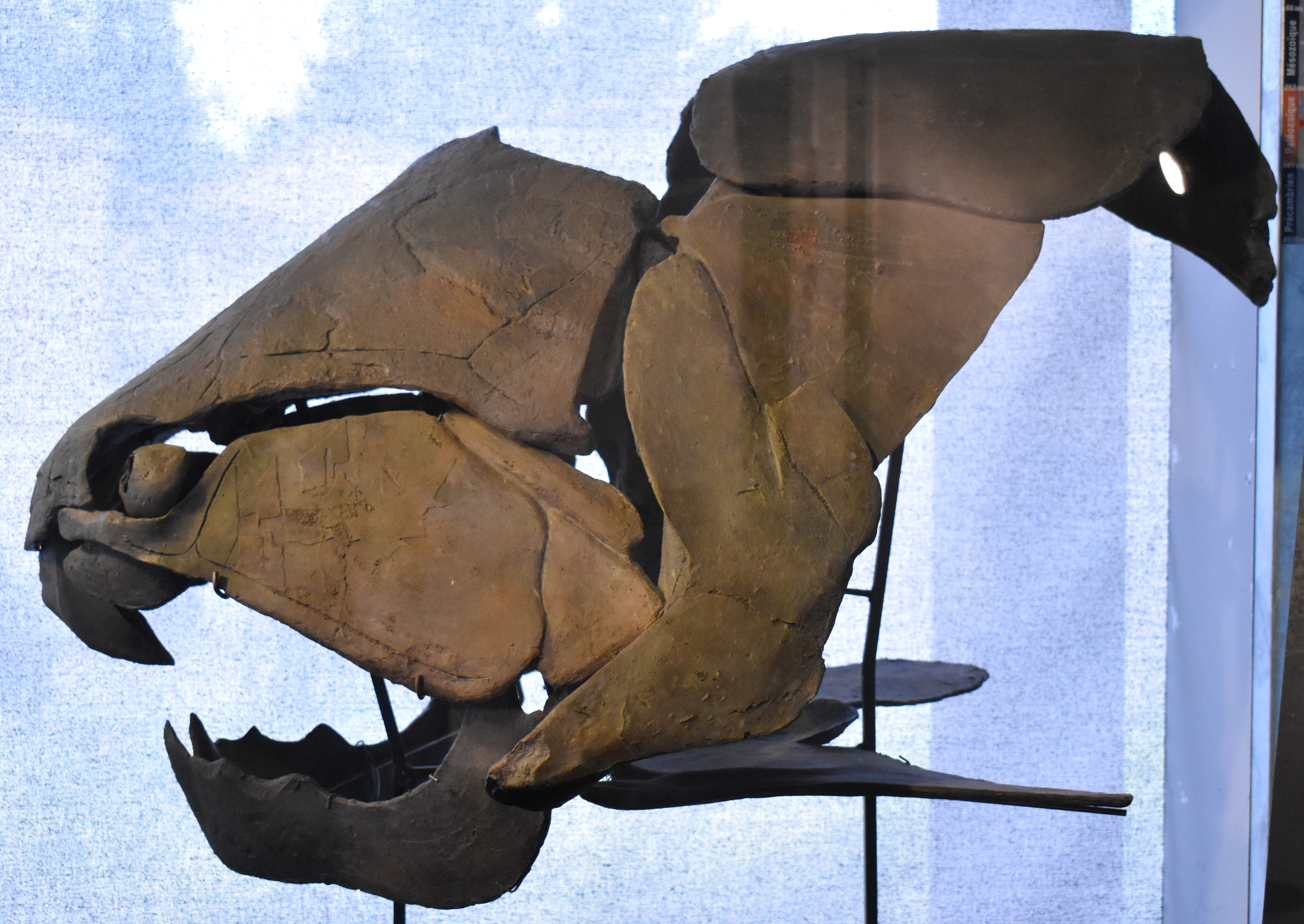
Dunkleosteus skull (c. 370 Mya), about 1 metre (3 1/2 feet) across

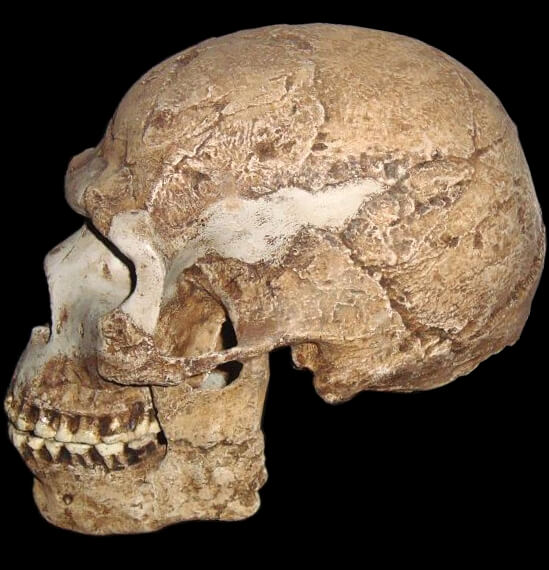
A hominin skull dated to about 90,000 years ago

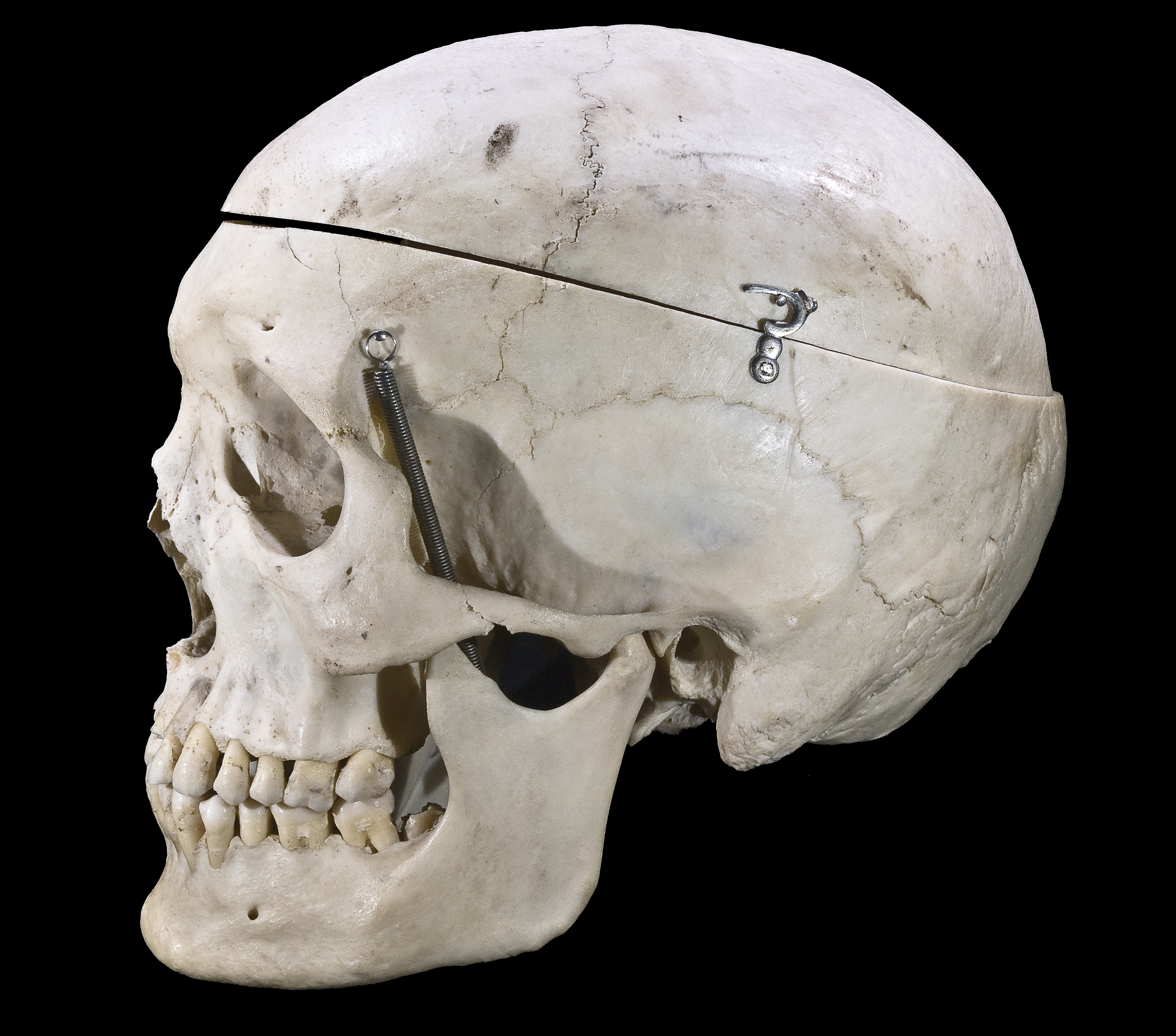
Modern human skull, exhibiting a different jaw-to-cranium ratio

== Development ==
The mandible forms as a bone (ossifies) from Meckel's cartilage, which forms the cartilaginous bar of the mandibular arch and, dorsally, parts of the middle ear. The two sides of the jawbone are inferiorly fused at the mandibular symphysis (the chin) during the first year of life. The cartilage of the ramus is replaced by fibrous tissue, which persists to form the sphenomandibular ligament. Between the lingula and the canine tooth the cartilage disappears, while the portion of it below and behind the incisor teeth becomes ossified and incorporated with this part of the mandible.

About the sixth week of fetal life, intramembranous ossification takes place in the membrane covering the outer surface of the ventral end of Meckel's cartilage, and each half of the bone is formed from a single center which appears, near the mental foramen. By the tenth week, the portion of Meckel's cartilage which lies below and behind the incisor teeth is surrounded and invaded by the dermal bone (also known as the membrane bone). Somewhat later, accessory nuclei of cartilage make their appearance, as

- a wedge-shaped nucleus in the condyloid process and extending downward through the ramus;
- a small strip along the anterior border of the coronoid process;
- smaller nuclei in the front part of both alveolar walls and along the front of the lower border of the bone.

These accessory nuclei possess no separate ossific centers but are invaded by the surrounding dermal bone and undergo absorption. The inner alveolar border, usually described as arising from a separate ossific center (splenial center), is formed in the human mandible by an ingrowth from the main mass of the bone.

Embryonic development, right side
24 millimetres (15/16 inch) long
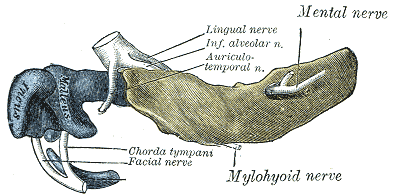
Lateral (outer) view

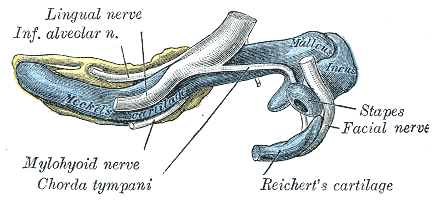
Medial (inner) view
Cartilage in blue
95 mm (3 3/4 in) long (after ten weeks)
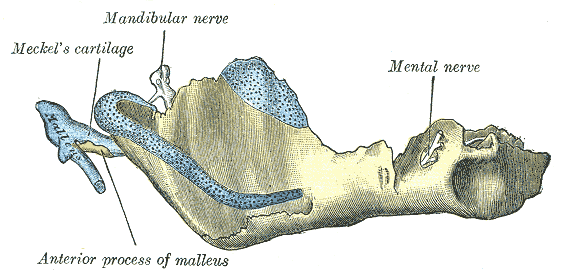
Lateral (outer) view

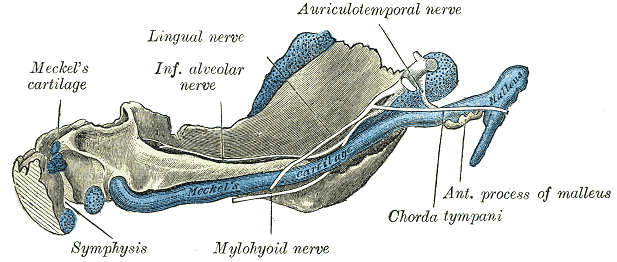
Medial (inner) view
Cartilage in blue, accessory cartilage nuclei stippled

=== Aging ===
At birth, the body of the bone is a mere shell, containing the sockets of the two incisor, the canine, and the two deciduous molar teeth, imperfectly partitioned off from one another. The mandibular canal is of large size and runs near the lower border of the bone; the mental foramen opens beneath the socket of the first deciduous molar tooth. The angle is obtuse (175°), and the condyloid portion is nearly in line with the body. The coronoid process is of comparatively large size, and projects above the level of the condyle.

After birth, the two segments of the bone become joined at the symphysis, from below upward, in the first year; but a trace of separation may be visible in the beginning of the second year, near the alveolar margin. The body becomes elongated in its whole length, but more especially behind the mental foramen, to provide space for the three additional teeth developed in this part. The depth of the body increases owing to increased growth of the alveolar part, to afford room for the roots of the teeth, and by thickening of the subdental portion which enables the jaw to withstand the powerful action of the masticatory muscles; but, the alveolar portion is the deeper of the two, and, consequently, the chief part of the body lies above the oblique line. The mandibular canal, after the second dentition, is situated just above the level of the mylohyoid line; and the mental foramen occupies the position usual to it in the adult. The angle becomes less obtuse, owing to the separation of the jaws by the teeth; about the fourth year it is 140°. The fibrocartilage of the mandibular symphysis fuses together in early childhood.

In the adult, the alveolar and subdental portions of the body are usually of equal depth. The mental foramen opens midway between the upper and lower borders of the bone, and the mandibular canal runs nearly parallel with the mylohyoid line. The ramus is almost vertical in direction, the angle measuring from 110° to 120°, also the adult condyle is higher than the coronoid process and the sigmoid notch becomes deeper. The adult mandible is the skull's largest and strongest bone.

In old age, the bone can become greatly reduced in volume where there is a loss of teeth, and consequent resorption of the alveolar process and interalveolar septa. Consequently, the chief part of the bone is below the oblique line. The mandibular canal, with the mental foramen opening from it, is closer to the alveolar border. The ramus is oblique in direction, the angle measures about 140°, and the neck of the condyle is more or less bent backward.

Changes in the mandible with age
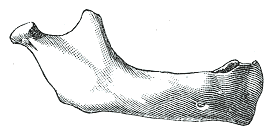
Newborn

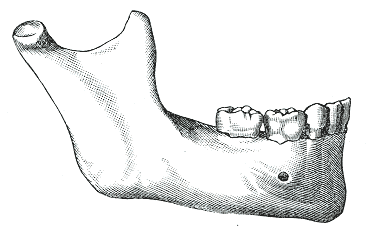
Childhood

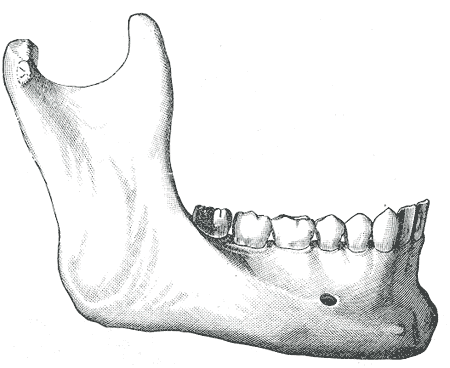
Adult

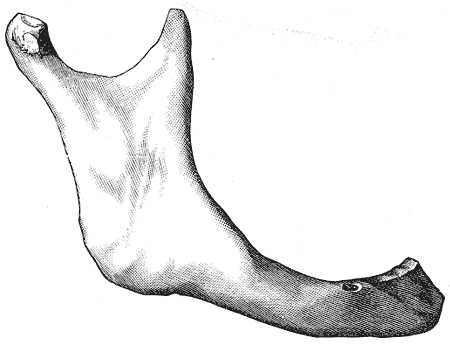
Old age

== Clinical significance ==
In recent centuries, the mandible was sometimes exposed to harmful elements resulting in phossy jaw and radium jaw, until the causes were understood. The mandible is generally difficult to anesthetize due to the depth of soft tissue in the posterior and anatomical variance. American surgeon William Stewart Halsted developed a nerve block technique using a syringe and cocaine to block the IAN, as well as the incisive, mental and lingual nerves. Although some nerve branches were left unblocked, the procedure was performed successfully by 1885 and could be applied in 3–5 minutes with perhaps 80–85% success. Two other, more effective techniques were established by the 1970s.

=== Fracture ===
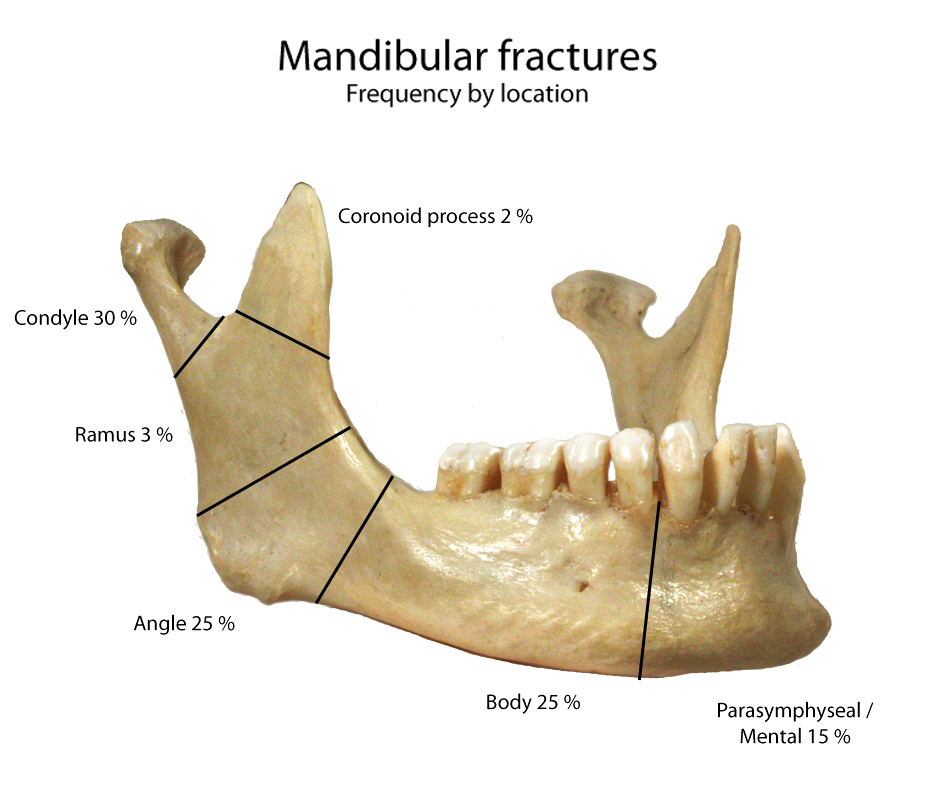
Fracture frequency by location

One fifth of facial injuries involve a mandibular fracture. Mandibular fractures are often accompanied by a 'twin fracture' on the opposite side. There is no universally accepted treatment protocol, as there is no consensus on the choice of techniques in a particular anatomical shape of mandibular fracture clinic. A common treatment involves attachment of metal plates to the fracture to assist in healing.

Causes of mandibular fractures
Cause	Percentage
Motor vehicle accident	40%
Assault	10%
Fall	10%
Sport	5%
Other	5%

=== Dislocation and displacement ===
The mandible may be dislocated anteriorly (to the front) and inferiorly (downwards) but very rarely posteriorly (backwards). The articular disk of the temporomandibular joint prevents the mandible from moving posteriorly, making the condylar neck particularly vulnerable to fractures. Further, various jawbone damage can cause temporomandibular joint dysfunction, with symptoms including pain and inflammation.

The jawbone can also become deviated in mandibular lateral displacement, a condition which can offset facial symmetry and cause posterior crossbite.

=== Resorption ===
The mandibular alveolar process can become resorbed when completely edentulous in the mandibular arch (occasionally noted also in partially edentulous cases). This resorption can occur to such an extent that the mental foramen is virtually on the superior border of the mandible, instead of opening on the anterior surface, changing its relative position. However, the more inferior body of the mandible is not affected and remains thick and rounded. With age and tooth loss, the alveolar process is absorbed so that the mandibular canal becomes nearer the superior border. Sometimes with excessive alveolar process absorption, the mandibular canal disappears entirely and deprives the IAN of its bony protection, although soft tissue continues to guard the nerve.

=== Mandibulectomy ===
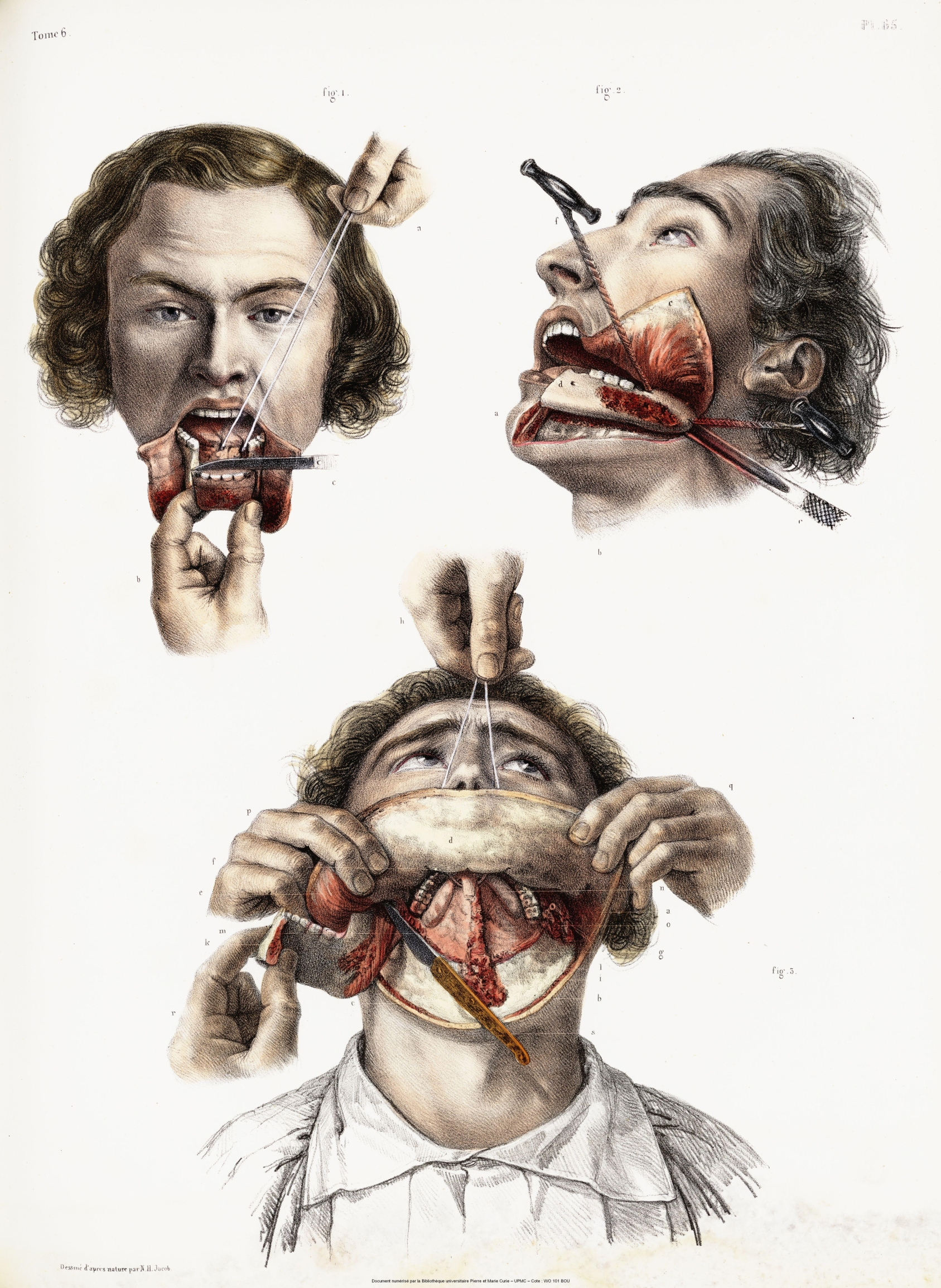
Segmental mandibulectomy procedures illustrated in the 19th century

A mandibulectomy is the surgical removal (resection) of all or part of the jawbone. The procedure can be invoked as a response to cancer (i.e. tumor removal), infection, injury, or osteonecrosis. In techniques illustrated in the 19th century, the flesh of the face is incised and peeled back for bone removal. By 1885, cocaine was used as a nerve block in mandibular surgeries. Mandibulectomies are now performed under general anesthesia in the First World, but can be done awake in tandem with a tracheotomy to ensure respiration.

The removal of a portion comprising the mandible's full height is called segmental mandibulectomy and usually necessitates the loss of the mental nerve; it is often accompanied by neck dissection to check for cancer in the lymph nodes. The removal of a shallower portion is known as partial or marginal mandibulectomy; in some cases, the penetrated flesh is limited to the internal mucous membrane of the gums, without significantly disturbing the facial structure.

The removed jawbone fragment can be replaced with metal plating or bone from elsewhere in the body. Oral muscles tend to work differently after the procedure, requiring therapy to relearn operations such as eating and speaking. A feeding tube is utilized during recovery and sometimes also a tracheotomy in case of swollen muscles.

Complications can involve difficulties with free flap transfer and airway management. Additional side effects include pain, infection, numbness, and (rarely, fatal) bleeding. Even successful surgeries can result in deformity, with an extreme version being referred to as the Andy Gump deformity after the comic book character, whose design apparently lacks a jaw; proposed reconstruction methods include implanting synthetic material, potentially involving 3D printing.

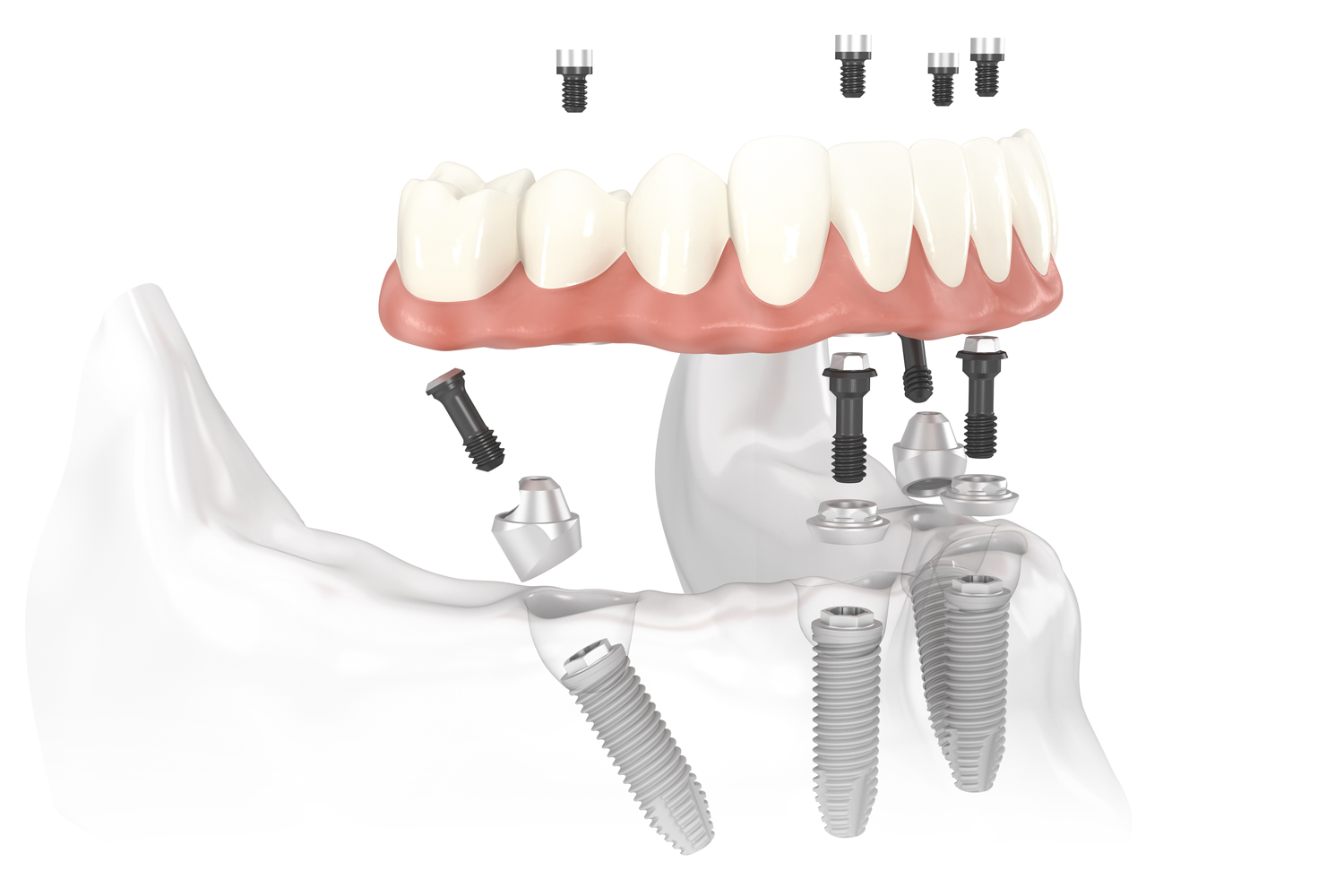
Dental implants supporting false teeth

=== Regeneration ===
Bone loss (as in osteoporosis) can be mitigated in the jawbone via bone grafting, which is sometimes performed to support dental implants (replacing teeth individually or in groups). Mandibular prosthetics date back to ancient Egypt and China, but significant advancements were made in the late 19th century with new techniques for attaching prosthetics to a depreciated jawbone as well as bone grafting.

In 2010, the first successful face transplant was conducted on a Spanish farmer after a self-inflicted gun accident; this included the replacement of the entire mandible.

=== Forensic medicine ===
The mandible provides forensic evidence as its form changes over a person's lifetime and thus can be used to determine a deceased person's age. Dental remains of Nazi leader Adolf Hitler, including part of a mandible with teeth (sundered along the alveolar process), are the only part of his body known to have been found.

== In culture ==
In the Hebrew Bible and Christian Old Testament Book of Judges, Samson used a donkey's jawbone to kill a thousand Philistines. As early as 1900, the phrase jaw-dropping was used as an adjective to describe a condition of shock in humans, e.g. when someone's mouth suddenly hangs agape in response to something. The exaggerated visual gag of a jaw dropping to the floor was a trademark of American animation director Tex Avery, who would often employ it when the Big Bad Wolf spies a sexually attractive woman. Gobstoppers, a type of hard candy, are known in North America as jawbreakers due to the fracturing risk they impose on teeth.

Owing in part to the forensic evidence of Hitler's death being limited to his dental remains, a common fringe narrative is that the dictator faked his death, suggesting marginal mandibulectomy and eyewitness deception. In later decades, American real-estate businessman Fred Trump had a mandibulectomy of the right ramus, causing a conspicuous deformity. In his fight against cancer, American film critic Roger Ebert had part of his jawbone removed in 2006, in addition to later surgeries.

== In arthropods ==
Mandibulates are characterized by a head tagma that has antennae and three feeding appendages that make up the arthropod mandible.

Mandibles in insects are pairs of hardened structures that are used to grind, crush and chew food. Mandibles have a broad molar region with ridged structures lined across to assist during chewing the food before it is swallowed. When paired with the maxillae (upper jaw structures), it is referred to as one of the gnathal appendages.

== Additional images ==
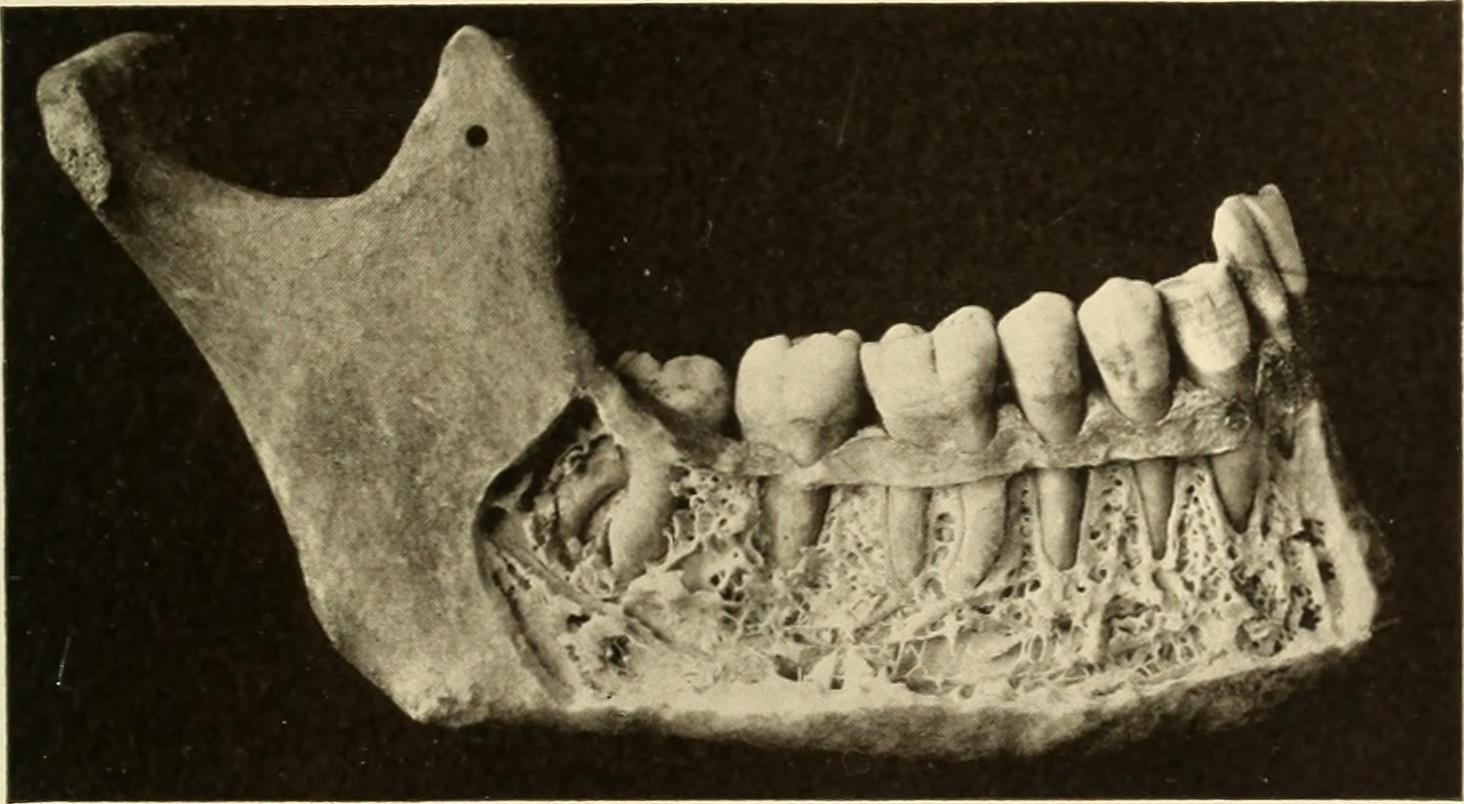
Cutaway view showing spongy bone

Turnaround with cranium

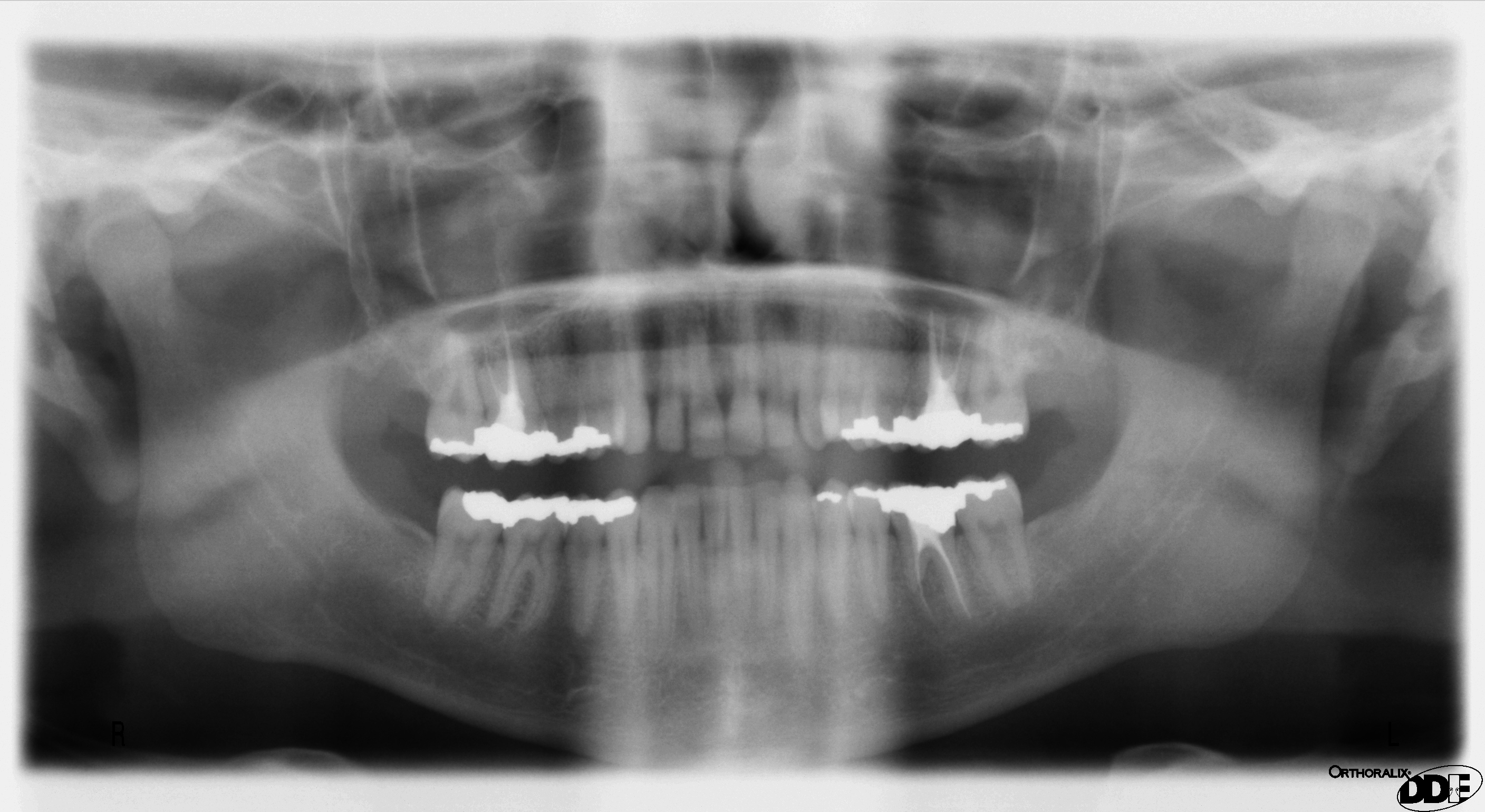
A panoramic radiograph of the mandibular region

== See also ==
- Anatomical terms of location
- Bone terminology
- Oral and maxillofacial surgery
- Simian shelf
