= Mental nerve =

Sensory nerve of the face

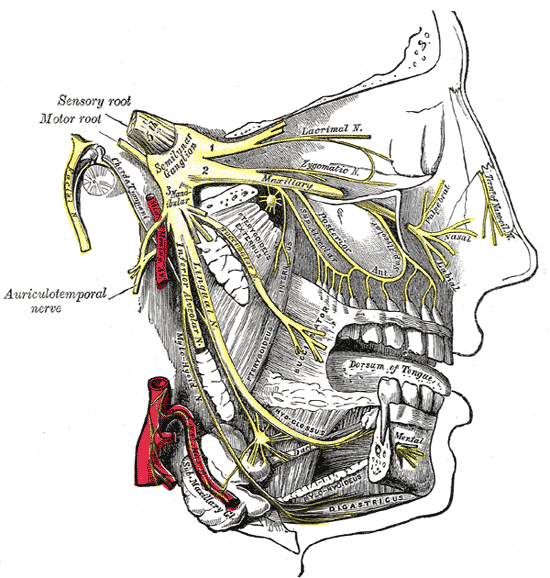
- Distribution of the maxillary and mandibular nerves, and the submaxillary ganglion. (Mental nerve visible at bottom right, at chin.)

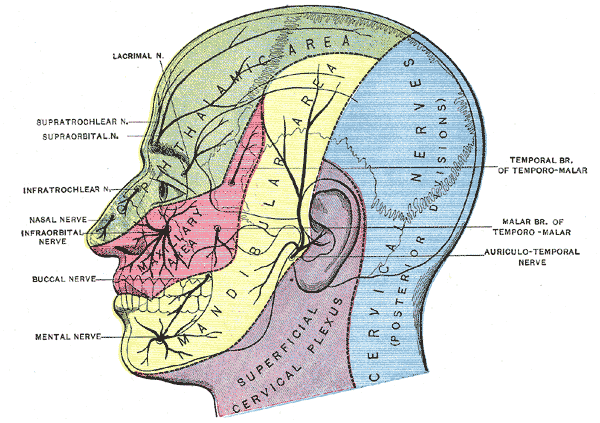
- Sensory areas of the head, showing the general distribution of the three divisions of the fifth nerve. (Mental nerve labeled at bottom left, near chin, in yellow.)

Details
- From: Inferior alveolar nerve
- Innervates: Chin, lower lip

Identifiers
- Latin: nervus mentalis
- TA98: A14.2.01.094
- TA2: 6279
- FMA: 53250

The mental nerve is a sensory nerve of the face. It is a branch of the posterior trunk of the inferior alveolar nerve, itself a branch of the mandibular nerve (CN V_{3}), itself a branch of the trigeminal nerve (CN V). It provides sensation to the front of the chin and the lower lip, as well as the gums of the anterior mandibular (lower) teeth. It can be blocked with local anaesthesia for procedures on the chin, lower lip, and mucous membrane of the inner cheek. Problems with the nerve cause chin numbness.

== Structure ==
The mental nerve is a branch of the posterior trunk of the inferior alveolar nerve. This is a branch of the mandibular nerve (CN V_{3}), itself a branch of the trigeminal nerve (CN V). It emerges from the mental foramen in the mandible. It divides into three branches beneath the depressor anguli oris muscle. One branch descends to the skin of the chin. Two branches ascend to the skin and mucous membrane of the lower lip. These branches communicate freely with the facial nerve.

== Function ==
The mental nerve provides sensation to the front of the chin and the lower lip. It also provides sensation to some of the gums of the anterior mandibular (lower) teeth.

== Clinical significance ==
=== Anaesthesia ===
The mental nerve can be blocked with local anesthesia. This can be used in surgery of the chin, the lower lip, and the buccal mucosa from midline to the second premolar. In animals, it can be used in surgery of the lower lip, and lower teeth anterior to the site of administration. Local anesthetic is injected into the soft tissue surrounding the mental foramen, or more rarely into the mental foramen itself (although this can cause damage).

=== Chin numbness ===
Problems with the mental nerve can cause numbness over the chin. This can be caused by many different illnesses.

=== Reflexes ===
When the mental nerve is stimulated with electricity, muscles that close the jaw (particularly temporalis muscle and masseter muscle) are inhibited. This is a brainstem reflex.
