= Zygomatic branches =

Zygomatic branches (referring to a structure near the zygomatic bone) may refer to:

- Zygomatic branches of facial nerve
- Zygomatic branch of the lacrimal artery
