= Masseteric =

Masseteric is an adjective meaning "of or pertaining to the Masseter muscle", such as:

- Masseteric artery
- Masseteric nerve
