= Zygomatic =

Zygomatic (from Greek ζύγωμα (zygōma), "yoke") may refer to:

- Zygomatic arch
- Zygomatic bone
- Zygomatic branches of the facial nerve
- Zygomaticus major muscle
- Zygomaticus minor muscle
- Zygomatic nerve
- Zygomatic process
  - Zygomatic process of frontal bone
  - Zygomatic process of maxilla
  - Zygomatic process of temporal bone
