= Mandibular setback surgery =

Surgical procedure

Mandibular setback surgery is a surgical procedure performed along the occlusal plane to prevent bite opening on the anterior or posterior teeth and retract the lower jaw for both functional and aesthetic effects in patients with mandibular prognathism. It is an orthodontic surgery that is a form of reconstructive plastic surgery. There are three main types of procedures for mandibular setback surgery: Bilateral Sagittal Split Osteotomy (BSSO), Intraoral Vertical Ramus Osteotomy (IVRO) and Extraoral Ramus Osteotomy (EVRO), depending on the magnitude of mandibular setback for each patient. Postoperative care aims to minimise postoperative complications, complications includes bite changes, relapse and nerve injury.

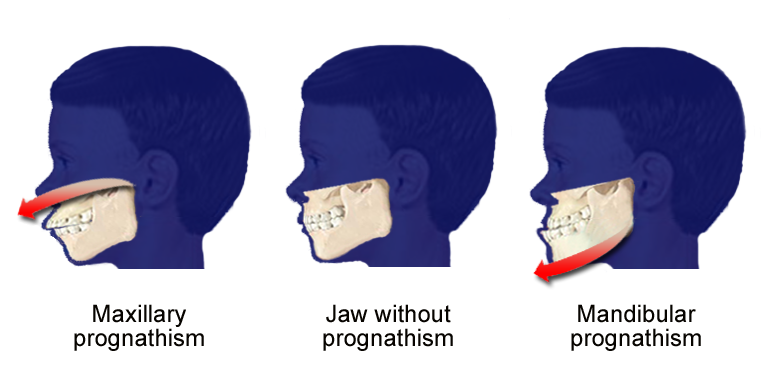
Mandibular prognathism

== History ==
The origin of orthognathic surgery was introduced by Simon P. Hullihen in 1849. Upon Hullihen's discovery of the procedure, many surgeons further investigated and modified approaches to correct mandibular prognathism. Vilray Blair and Edward H. Angle collaborated to introduce osteotomy to the mandibular body with a horizontal incision, marking the beginning of orthognathic surgery. With these notable modifications in surgical procedures for prognathism, BSSO, IVRO and EVRO are procedures used in practise to treat individuals with dentofacial deformities. VRO was first introduced as EVRO by Caldwell and Letterman and further modified into IVRO by Moose in 1964. BSSO was then introduced by Obwegeser in 1959.

== Anatomy ==
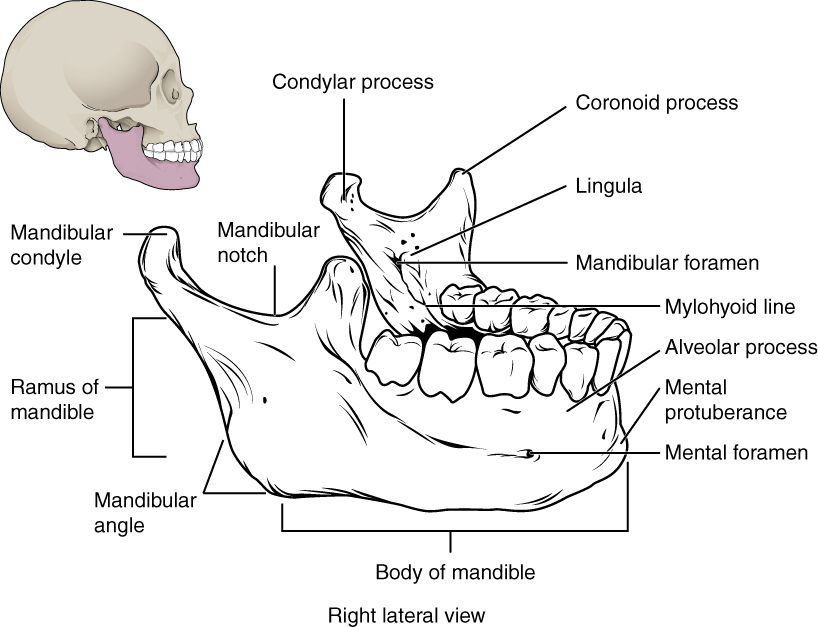
Anatomical landmarks of the mandible from a right lateral view

Mandible is a movable solitary bone forming the lower jaw. It is composed of a mandibular body and two mandibular rami (singular: ramus) on bilateral sides of the face. The mandibular ramus contains the mandibular foramen, which is where the inferior alveolar nerve and artery enters. Each end of the ramus has a projection that articulates with the temporal bones via temporomandibular joint called mandibular condyle.

Lingula is superior to mandibular foramen on the mandibular ramus, which often acts as a recognisable feature for surgical procedures.

== Surgical procedures ==
BSSO and IVRO are the two most common types of procedures used for mandibular setback surgery while EVRO is carried out for specific cases.

=== Bilateral Sagittal Split Osteotomy (BSSO) ===
External oblique line of the mandible (shown in red)

A vertical incision is performed on the inferior and lateral sides of the soft tissue in the mouth at a distance from the adjacent gums. The cut is performed from the mandibular ramus to the mandibular body along the external oblique line, down to the mandibular first molar region, and further down the buccal vestibule of the mandible. A precise cut allows sufficient tissues remained for closing the suture. The surrounding soft tissue from the bone is dissected and elevated in a subperiosteal plane to see the mandibular ramus clearly. The mandibular foramen and the lingula must also be exposed without damaging the inferior alveolar nerve. A clamp is used to hold the layers in a fixed position for mandibular osteotomy to be carried out.

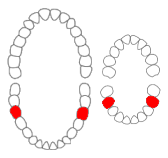
Mandibular first molar teeth (shown in red)

The BSSO technique requires two cuts of the mandible utilising an osteotome that is inclined to one side. Firstly, the lateral osteotomy starts at the buccal cortex, the bone in the buccal space. This split is done vertically down to the first or second molar region. Then the medial osteotomy is done on the lingual cortical bone, which extends to the anterior border of the ramus posterior and to the inferior alveolar canal. Subsequently, the fractures of the ramus are split by applying slight force.

Mobilisation of the segments are done to the pre-arranged position and fixed internally with screws and plates. BSSO allows rigid fixation and increases stability of mandibular setbacks. However, as the nerve is manipulated to a large extent during the surgery, it increases the chance of patients experiencing neurosensory loss. Studies have shown statistically that another type of method, IVRO, can reduce the chance of neurosensory disturbance.

=== Intraoral Vertical Ramus Osteotomy (IVRO) ===
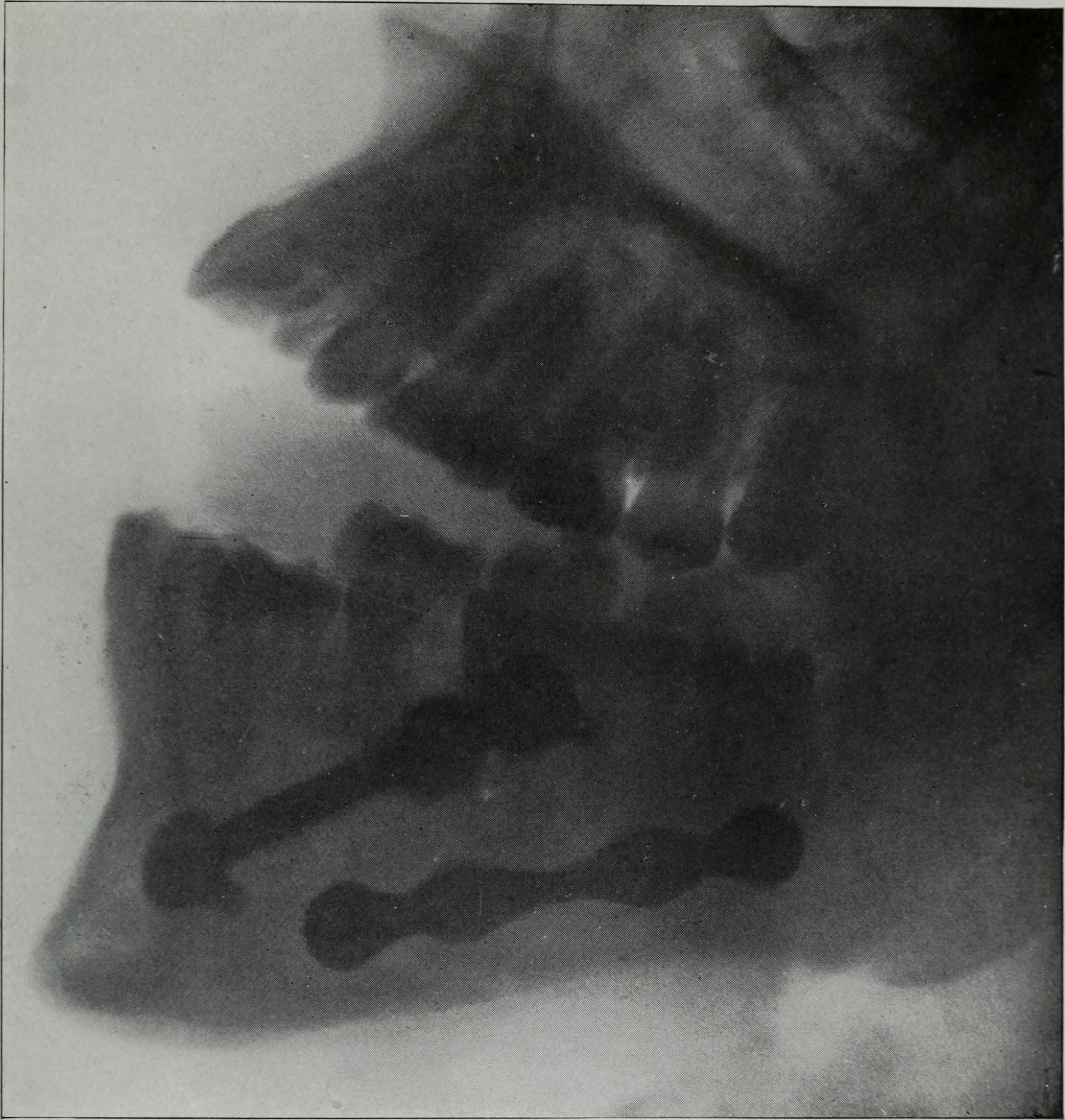
Inter-maxillary fixation of the mandible

Firstly, a horizontal incision through the oral mucosa along the anterior border of the ramus of mandible within the mouth allows surgeons to reach the underlying bone and tissue of the lower jaw. Once the cut opens near the coronoid process and mandibular first molar region, a deeper dissection is done so the mandibular notch, inferior and posterior of the ramus are visible. Then, the IVRO can be performed.

A pair of retractors are positioned properly and carefully for clear exposure of the ramus. The cutting of the bone is done by surgical oscillating saw, at an angle of 105° precisely behind the body prominence of antilingula, superior to the sigmoid notch and inferior to the mandibular angle. The bone fragment is adjusted to the preoperative planned position, which sets the lower jaw backwards. Stabilisation of the jaw at its modified position is then done through wiring. The inter-maxillary fixation is usually kept for around six weeks.

The IVRO procedure can be performed if the magnitude of the mandibular setback is within 10mm. The limitation of the specific range of setback is to prevent postoperative forward relapse and the dislocation of mandibular condylar head. When the required adjustment of the jaw exceeds 10mm, patients will most likely undertake the EVRO procedure.

=== Extraoral Vertical Ramus Osteotomy (EVRO) ===
The incision for EVRO is made on the most superficial layer of the skin, approximately 1 to 2 cm below the mandibular angle. The dissection cuts the platysma and the masseter muscle. As the skin dissection is done, a small protrude of the ramus could be observed. This allows the mandible osteotomy to be done safely by avoiding damaging the adjacent nerves.

The bony cut is made from the sigmoid notch to the mandibular angle with an osteotome. The bony fragment at the proximal end is rearranged and stabilized using screws, plates, or wires. The closure of the wound is done layer by layer. The intermaxillary fixation is usually kept for a week to ten days.

Compared to BSSO and IVRO, this technique takes the least surgical time as it is performed on the external surface, which allows the surgeons to have easier access and clearer vision. However, the surgical scar that is left behind could be a concern to certain patients.

== Effects ==
The mandibular setback surgery can improve masticatory function and facial aesthetics by repositioning the jaw and mouth, which can have a positive effect on the patient's psychosocial well-being.

=== Functional ===
Patients with mandibular prognathism may have difficulty chewing, speaking, and breathing, which can affect their quality of life. The mandibular setback surgery improves one's masticatory muscle activity and speech intelligibility. The mandibular setback surgery improves functional difficulties caused by mandibular prognathism.

=== Aesthetic ===
Aesthetic correction is second positive effect of mandibular setback surgery. In particular, it improves the asymmetry of the upper and lower lip in patients with mandibular prognathism. Patients after the surgery may result in a more pronounced and defined chin by repositioning the jaw. Ultimately, it allows for a more balanced and harmonious facial profile.

=== Psychological ===
Post-surgery questionnaires results indicated improved psychosocial well-being, self-esteem and social functioning in patients after the mandibular setback surgery. There is also a high patient satisfaction rate for the surgery. These show how the mandibular setback surgery improves well-being of patients with mandibular prognathism.

== Post-operative care ==
After the setback surgery, a 2-week recovery period is needed for the wires to be closed and inter-maxillary fixation to stabilise the position of the mandible. Patients would stay for a minimum of 1 to 2 days and exception may occur if a complication has occurred. Post-operative assessments need to be done for the 2 weeks after the operation.

Gum chewing and patient education exercise post-surgery can improve masticatory function in patient and minimise the risk of complications.

== Risk and complications ==
More than 40% of patients have complications after mandibular setback surgery. Complications include bite changes, nerve injuries and relapse.

=== Bite changes ===
Bite changes occur in 20.3% of the cases post-setback surgery. Change in pharyngeal airway space and tongue position can have a significant effect on bite changes after mandibular setback surgery and cause obstructive sleep apnea.

The tongue is normally positioned against the roof of the mouth, supporting the upper jaw. After surgery, the change in the position of the tongue affects the position of the jaw, leading to bite changes. Bite changes can narrow the pharyngeal airway space after surgery can lead obstructive sleep apnea. Incorrect jaw positioning requires additional surgery to reposition the jaw and open up the airway.

=== Relapse ===
9.2% of the patients who underwent the mandibular setback surgery has found post-surgery relapse. This is caused by actions of the condyle resorption. Condyle resorption is when the bone tissue is lost in the condyle. Condyle resorption reduces stability of the mandible and cause long term skeletal relapse. When the mandible is not stabilised, it allows movement of the mandible into its pre-operative position, contributing to early relapse. Bone fixation procedures will be needed due to the lack of bone healing.

=== Nerve injuries ===
Nerve injuries occur in 3.7% of the patients after the mandibular setback surgery. Cutting and repositioning of the mandible in the surgery can potentially damage nerves in the mandible that is responsible for sensation and movement. Specifically, the inferior alveolar nerve are the commonly affected nerve in the surgery. Less common nerves injuries are on the lingual nerve and mental nerve, which are responsible for tongue and chin sensation respectively. The lingual nerve is affected by the wire placement in the molar region. The mental nerve injury can be caused by the presence of bony spurs. A damage in the nerve may require additional therapy to repair the loss of ability in the nerves.
