= Malar region =

The malar region (from Latin malarsis, coming from Latin mala meaning 'cheekbone' or 'jawbone'), also known as the malar eminence, is a junction area located between the nasolabial segments and the lid-cheek on the human face. Malar deficiency is formed by the lack of protrusion of the zygomatic bone.

== Formation ==
The malar region is the anterior area of the zygomatic bone, fenestrated by the zygomaticofacial foramen. It is triangular in shape.
