= Lingala (disambiguation) =

Lingala can refer to:

- Lingala language in central Africa
- Lingala, Mandavalli mandal a village in Mandavalli mandal, Krishna district, Andhra Pradesh, India.
- Lingala, Vatsavai mandal a village in Vatsavai mandal, Krishna district, Andhra Pradesh, India.
- Lingala, Kadapa district, a village and mandal in Kadapa district, Andhra Pradesh, India.
- Lingala, Telangana, a village in Khammam district, state of Telangana, India.
- Lingala, NTR district, a village in NTR district, state of Andhra Pradesh, India.

== See also ==
- Lingala music, a synonym for Soukous music
