= Zygomatic branches of the facial nerve =

Nerves of the face

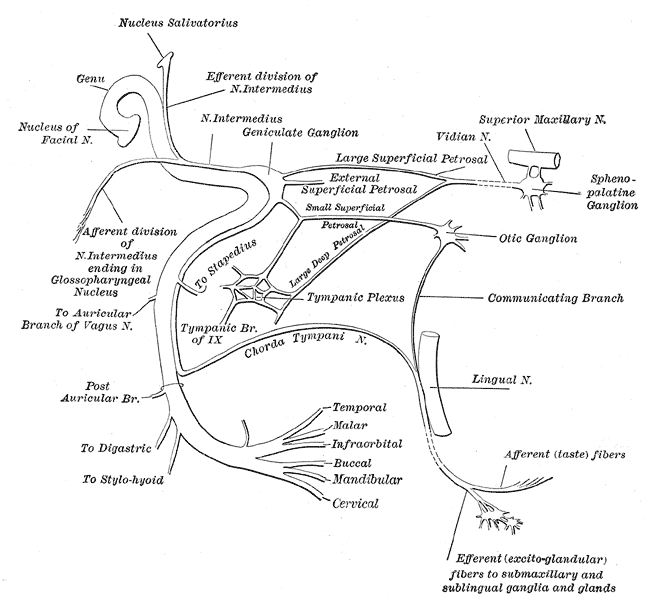
- Plan of the facial and intermediate nerves and their communication with other nerves (labeled at center bottom, fifth from bottom, as "Malar")

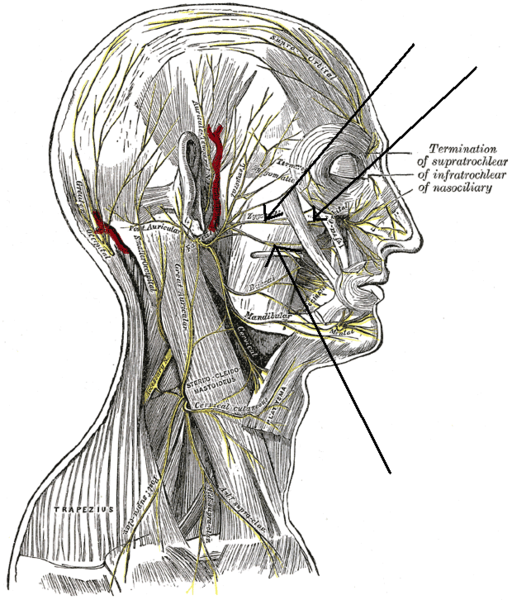
- The nerves of the scalp, face, and side of neck (zygomatic branches labeled at center, near cheek)

Details
- From: Facial nerve

Identifiers
- Latin: rami zygomatici nervi facialis
- TA98: A14.2.01.110
- TA2: 6303
- FMA: 53307

The zygomatic branches of the facial nerve (malar branches) are nerves of the face. They run across the zygomatic bone to the lateral angle of the orbit. Here, they supply the orbicularis oculi muscle, and join with filaments from the lacrimal nerve and the zygomaticofacial branch of the maxillary nerve (CN V_{2}).

== Structure ==
The zygomatic branches of the facial nerve are branches of the facial nerve (CN VII). They run across the zygomatic bone to the lateral angle of the orbit. This is deep to zygomaticus major muscle. They send fibres to orbicularis oculi muscle.

=== Connections ===
The zygomatic branches of the facial nerve have many nerve connections. Along their course, there may be connections with the buccal branches of the facial nerve. They join with filaments from the lacrimal nerve and the zygomaticofacial nerve from the maxillary nerve (CN V_{2}). They also join with the inferior palpebral nerve and the superior labial nerve, both from the infraorbital nerve.

== Function ==
The zygomatic branches of the facial nerve supply part of the orbicularis oculi muscle. This is used to close the eyelid.

== Clinical significance ==
=== Testing ===
To test the zygomatic branches of the facial nerve, a patient is asked to close their eyes tightly. This uses orbicularis oculi muscle. The zygomatic branches of the facial nerve may be recorded and stimulated with an electrode.

=== Surgical damage ===
Rarely, the zygomatic branches of the facial nerve may be damaged during surgery on the temporomandibular joint (TMJ).

== Additional images ==
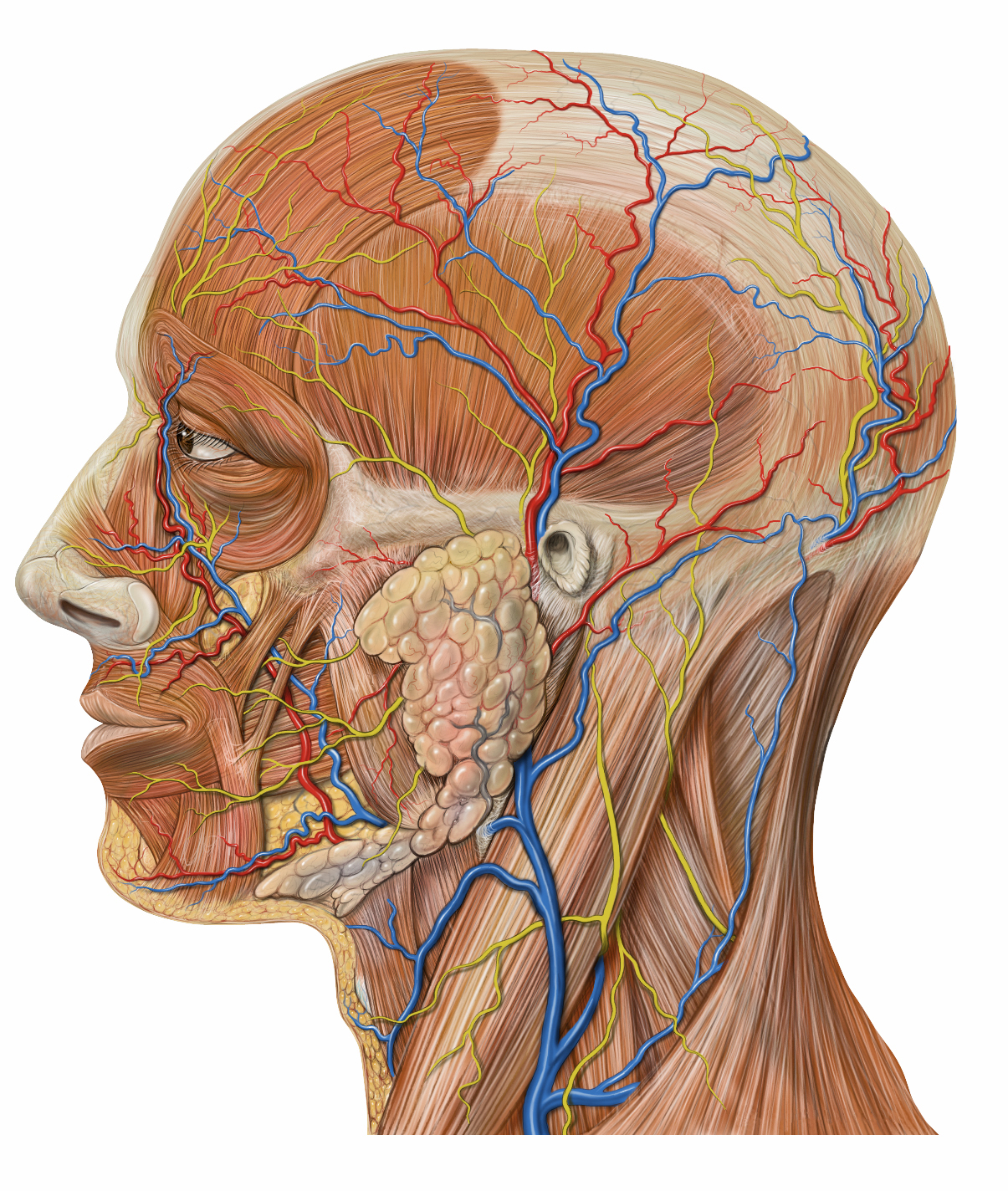
Lateral head anatomy detail

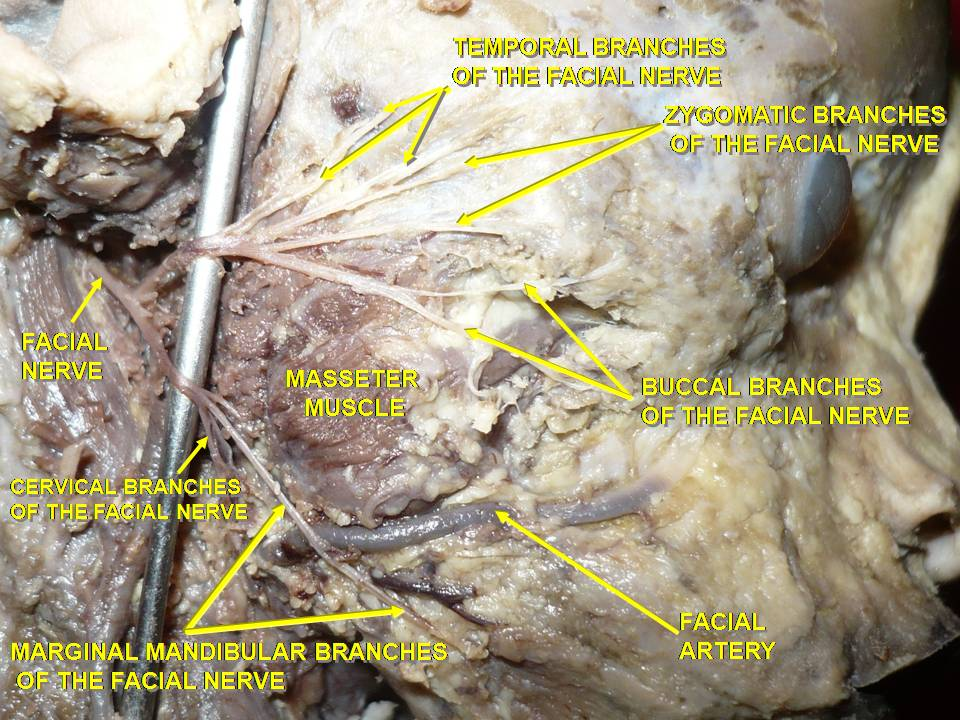
Lateral head anatomy detail.Dissection the newborn

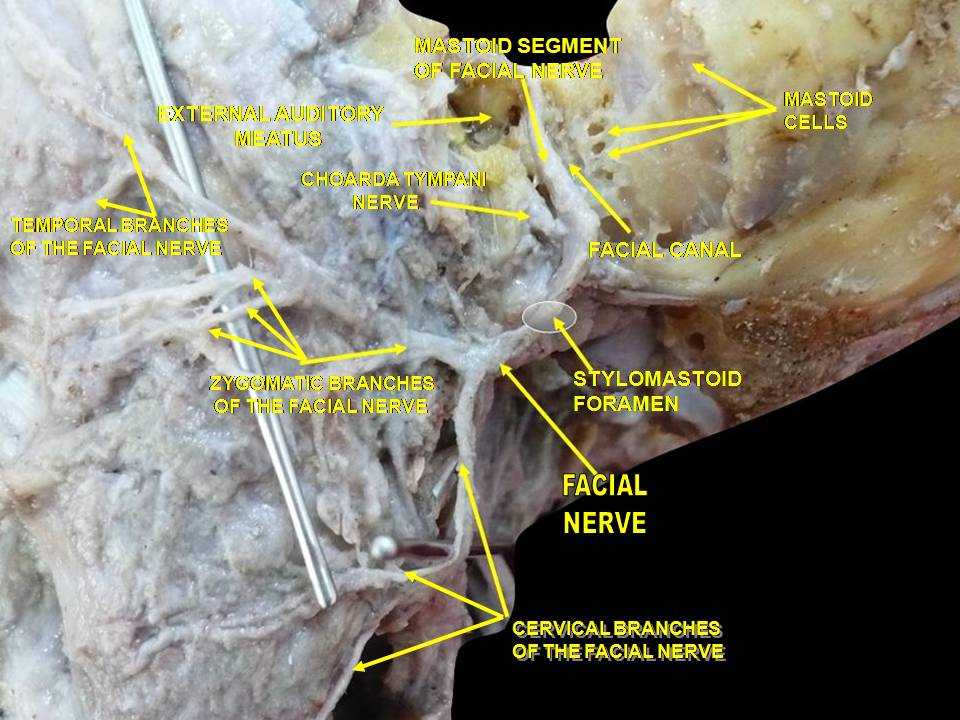
Lateral head anatomy detail.Facial nerve dissection.

== See also ==
- Zygomatic nerve
- Zygomaticus major muscle
- Zygomaticus minor muscle
