= Orbital foramen =

Orbital foramen may refer to:

- Infraorbital foramen
- Zygomatico-orbital foramina
