= Lacrimal artery =

Artery of the orbit

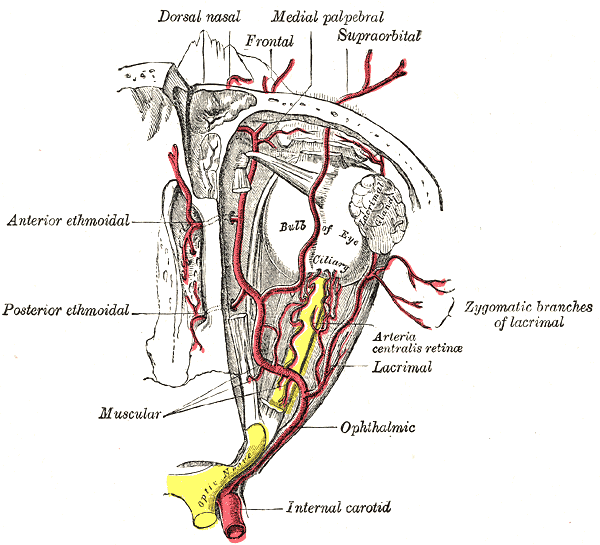
- The ophthalmic artery and its branches. (Lacrimal artery visible at center right.)

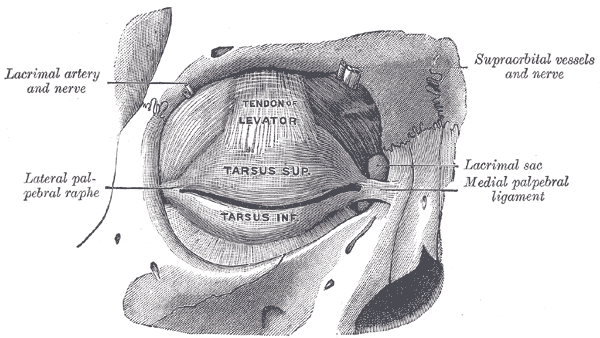
- The tarsi and their ligaments. Right eye; front view. (Lacrimal artery visible at upper left.)

Details
- Source: Ophthalmic artery
- Branches: Lateral palpebral arteries zygomatic branches recurrent branch
- Supplies: Lacrimal gland, eyelids, conjunctiva

Identifiers
- Latin: arteria lacrimalis
- TA98: A12.2.06.027
- TA2: 4476
- FMA: 49927

The lacrimal artery is an artery of the orbit. It is a branch of the ophthalmic artery. It accompanies the lacrimal nerve along the upper border of the lateral rectus muscle, travelling forward to reach the lacrimal gland. It supplies the lacrimal gland, as well as two rectus muscles of the eye, the eyelids, and the conjunctiva.

== Structure ==
=== Origin ===
The lacrimal artery is normally a branch of the ophthalmic artery and represents one of its largest branches. Its origin occurs near the optic canal. It usually branches off the ophthalmic artery just after the ophthalmic artery's entry into the orbit. It can rarely arise before the ophthalmic artery enters the optic canal.

=== Course and relations ===
The lacrimal artery accompanies the lacrimal nerve along the upper border of the lateral rectus muscle. It travels anterior-ward to supply the lacrimal gland.

=== Branches and distribution ===
The lacrimal artery supplies the lacrimal gland, the eyelids and conjunctiva, and the superior rectus muscle and lateral rectus muscle.

Recurrent meningeal branch

A recurrent meningeal branch may sometimes arise from the lacrimal artery to pass backwards, exiting the orbit through the lateral part of the superior orbital fissure to reach the dura mater. It anastomoses with a branch of the middle meningeal artery.

Zygomatic branches

The lacrimal artery also gives off one or two zygomatic branches: one passes through the zygomatico-temporal foramen to reach the temporal fossa, and anastomoses with the deep temporal arteries; another appears on the cheek through the zygomatico-facial foramen, and anastomoses with the transverse facial artery.

Terminal branches

Its terminal branches after the lacrimal gland are distributed to the eyelids and conjunctiva.

Two terminal branches supplying the eyelids are of considerable size and are termed the lateral palpebral arteries.

=== Variation ===
The lacrimal artery usually branches from the ophthalmic artery after it enters the orbit, but may rarely branch off before the ophthalmic artery enters the orbit. It is sometimes instead derived from one of the anterior branches of the middle meningeal artery.

It shows some variation in course.

== Additional images ==
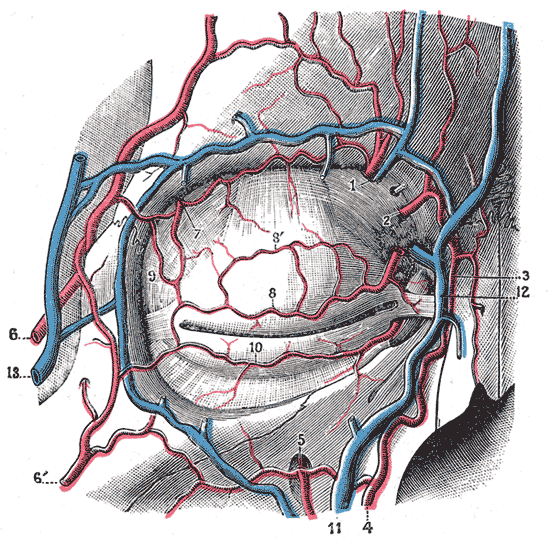
Bloodvessels of the eyelids, front view.
