= Bheemla Nayak (soundtrack) =

- Soundtrack album cover

Soundtrack album by Thaman S
- Released: 14 February 2022
- Recorded: 2021–2022
- Genre: Feature film soundtrack
- Length: 28:39
- Language: Telugu
- Label: Aditya Music
- Producer: Thaman S

Thaman S chronology
Akhanda (2022)	Bheemla Nayak (2022)	Ghani (2022)

Singles from Bheemla Nayak
- 1. "Bheemla Nayak" Released: 2 September 2021; 2. "Antha Ishtam" Released: 23 September 2021; 3. "Lala Bheemla" Released: 1 November 2021; 4. "Adavi Thalli Maata" Released: 10 December 2021; 5. "Lala Bheemla (DJ Version)" Released: 31 December 2021; 6. "Bheemla Back on Duty" Released: 4 March 2022

Bheemla Nayak is the soundtrack album composed by Thaman S for the 2022 Indian Telugu-language film of the same name, directed by Saagar K. Chandra from a screenplay written by Trivikram Srinivas. A remake of the Malayalam-language film Ayyappanum Koshiyum (2020), the film stars Pawan Kalyan, Rana Daggubati, Nithya Menen and Samyuktha Menon. The film's soundtrack album featured seven songs (also including a bonus track), featuring lyrics written by Ramajogayya Sastry, Trivikram, Roll Rida and Kasarla Shyam. The album was released on 14 February 2022 under the Aditya Music label.

== Background ==
The film marks Thaman's second collaboration with Pawan Kalyan after Vakeel Saab (2021) and his first with Chandra. The original counterpart film Ayyapanum Koshiyum had nearly four songs, whereas the Telugu remake had seven songs. Thaman had said that "It was not easy for Bheemla Nayak. From the start, there was some or the other issue, for this movie. Every day, we used to start working with much stubbornness." As the film is set in the forest regions of Andhra Pradesh, Thaman believed that "every musical sound has to come from natural habitat, and they should not seem fancy". He also wanted the music to give feel of the wild by using sounds and instruments. At the same time, it should be new to cater to the audience.

== Composition ==
Thaman almost took six months at the sea for composing the soundtrack, as he had to experiment with the beats. He wanted it to sound like a good music band that got lost in the jungles. Hence, he worked on the rhythmic beats, rather with the traditional pallavi—charanam format. He used a wide range of instruments, including special drums being imported from Persia. Thaman roped two folk musical artists in the Telangana region, for the soundtrack of Bheemla Nayak. Kinnera-instrumentalist Darshanam Mogilaiah hailing from Lingala, Mandavalli mandal, located in Nagarkurnool crooned the opening verses of the track. In an interview with ABN Andhra Jyothi, Thaman had revealed about his inclusion in the title track, saying:

"Pawan Kalyan told Trivikram about Mogilaiah and his work. He asked me to call and rope him in for the movie. Mogilaiah stays away from the movies. A man of the soil, urban society looks mysterious to him. It took almost four days for him to get used to the city's environment. He is a lovely person. Trivikram and Pawan Kalyan were very particular to feature him in the lyrical video."

Kumari Durgavva, a singer hailing from Kotapally, Mancherial crooned the track "Adavi Thalli Maata" along with Sahithi Chaganti. The film was reported to have a song sung by Kailash Kher which was penned by Ramajogayya Sastry, but was not chosen in the final soundtrack. Also, Geetha Madhuri confirmed on Instagram, saying that she had crooned a lullaby number for the film. However, the track was crooned by Mohana Bhogaraju, instead of Madhuri, and whose track was entitled as "O Sandamama". Vaishnavi Kovvuri, a contestant of the Telugu edition of Indian Idol was chosen to record vocals for the track "Bheemla Back on Duty". Thaman, who was also one of the judges of the reality show appreciated her performance and chose her to croon for the song along with other singers: Pratyusha Pallapothu, Rachitha Rayaprolu, Parnika, Rita Thygarajan, Lakshmi Meghna.

== Marketing ==
In late-August 2021, the film's audio rights were sold to ₹5.04 crore (US$530,000). On 2 September 2021, coinciding Pawan Kalyan's 50th birthday, the first single — the film's title track was unveiled. The song had lyrics written by Ramajogayya Sastry and sung by Sri Krishna, Prudhvi Chandra and Ram Miriyala, with backing vocals by Alphons Joseph. The promotional music video for the song was shot in Annapurna Studios, and eventually ₹40 lakh (US$42,000) has been spent for the visual effects and sets. Popular cinematographer Manoj Paramahamsa shot and handled visual effects for the music video. On 23 September 2021, the second song "Antha Ishtam" was released. Sung by K. S. Chithra, the song is picturised on the relationship between Pawan Kalyan and Nithya Menen.

The promo for the third single titled "Lala Bheemla" was released on 27 October and the full song was released on 1 November. The fourth single track, "Adavi Thalli Maata" was intended to be released on 1 December, but due to the untimely demise of lyricist Sirivennela Seetharama Sastry on 30 November 2021, the track's release was postponed as a mark of respect to the lyricist. The track was later unveiled on 10 December. On New Year's Eve (31 December 2021), the makers launched the DJ version of the track "Lala Bheemla" as a single, which was not featured in the film. The song "Bheemla Back on Duty", which played in the end credits of the film, was released as a bonus single on 4 March (after the film and the soundtrack release).

== Release ==
The full soundtrack was released through Aditya Music on 14 February 2022. At the pre-release event held on 18 February, Thaman and his musical team performed all the tracks in the event.

== Track listing ==
Track listing
No.	Title	Lyrics	Singer(s)	Length
1.	"Adavi Gusagusalu"	Kasarla Shyam	Sri Krishna, Sravana Bhargavi	4:43
2.	"Bheemla Nayak"	Ramajogayya Sastry	Sri Krishna, Prudhvi Chandra, Kinnera Mogulaiah, Ram Miriyala	5:14
3.	"Antha Ishtam"	Ramajogayya Sastry	K. S. Chithra	3:40
4.	"Lala Bheemla"	Trivikram Srinivas	Arun Kaundinya	2:31
5.	"O Sandamama"	Kasarla Shyam	Mohana Bhogaraju	2:35
6.	"Adavi Thalli Maata"	Ramajogayya Sastry	Kummari Durgavva, Sahiti Chaganti	2:24
7.	"Bheemla Back on Duty"	Roll Rida	Vaishnavi Kovvuri, Pratyusha Pallapothu, Rachitha Rayaprolu, Parnika, Rita Thyagarajan, Lakshmi Meghna	4:03
8.	"Lala Bheemla" (DJ Version)	Trivikram Srinivas	Arun Kaundinya	3:28
Total length:				28:39

== Controversy ==
On 3 September 2021, a day after the release of the title song, Hyderabad-based Deputy Commissioner of Police (DCP), M. Ramesh criticised the track for showcasing the cops in poor taste through the lyrics of the track, and claimed that "There was no angle of praising the cops for the kind of hard work and sacrifices they do. In an era where we practice friendly policing, the song tries to project that cops beat people, but we actually don't! These lyrics may send the wrong signal to the public. I believe music should be based on lyrics and not vice-versa." Thaman, however replied to this issue, saying that song has been put in to suit the film's situation and claimed that his (and the team's) intention is not to hurt anyone. He further said that he and Kalyan, had a high regard for police officials and their struggles, and the team had also researched their background, before working on the song.

"In the film, Pawan Kalyan is a nature lover (apart from being a cop), and as such he gets himself posted in a green forest. When people try to spoil the peace and environment and irritate him, that's when we bring out this song. While we have taken few cinematic liberties, our intention is not to hurt anyone. It's just for the film's situation, the song has been put up so."

— S. Thaman

Thaman was blamed for the delayed and rushed work on the film's background score, in the last minute; it was mostly due to his work in multiple films, as he additionally worked on the background score of Radhe Shyam and DJ Tillu. While he was appreciated for the film score, he also received criticism from netizens as they pointed out the similarities of the song played in the end credits ("Bheemla Back on Duty") to that of the independent song "That's So EmmV" composed by EmmV.

== Reception ==
A critical review from Indiaglitz wrote "Thaman's journey to present a new style continues in the Bheemla Nayak soundtrack. The choice of singers is turning out to be a unique feature of the album, and they do a splendid job of making the sounds more pulsating than it already is. A winner that will surely have the fans foot-tap with abandon." Another review from Pinkvilla summarised "Bheemla Nayak plays to the tastes of the mass audience without going ultra-loud or flashy. While being unapologetically commercial in its sensibilities, it lets Thaman whip up a new flavour of music. While the title track, as well as 'La La Bheemla', are intuitive (and the songs are filled with sass and scorching elevation shots), the rest of the songs suck the audience into the mood of the film. The BGM is consistently engaging."

Sankeertana Varma of Firstpost opined that "the score complements the story and brings it alive" and appreciated Thaman calling him "as the film's biggest asset". Ram Venkat Srikar in his review for The New Indian Express wrote "Thaman is truly in his prime and continues his golden streak with this film. Be it the aforementioned interval sequence or the La la Bheemla song that follows, or the much-hyped action sequence set in a lodge or the climax, Thaman pumps oxygen into these scenes." However, Balakrishna Ganesan of The News Minute, who gave a negative review for the film said "Music director Thaman S tries to keep the movie engaging with his energetic background score. But after a point, it becomes repetitive."

== Legacy and influence ==
Audience appreciated Thaman's musical score as well as the choice of singers for the film's soundtrack. Thaman was further appreciated for the initiative of bringing folk singers Kumari Durgavva and Darshanam Mogulaiah for rendering a track in the album. Mogulaiah received popularity soon after the single release, who was later given ₹2 lakh (US$2,100) aid from Pawan Kalyan, said in an interview to The Indian Express: "I am very happy that a lot of people recognise my artform now. The title song of the movie is folklore of Miya Saab I have been singing for decades. They did make some changes but I am happy". He later received the Padma Shri award for his "distinguished contribution to the Kinnera art form".
