= Lingula =

Lingula, Latin for "little tongue", may refer to:

- Lingula (brachiopod), a brachiopod genus of the family Lingulidae
- A wide strap above the instep in sandals
- In anatomy:
  - the Lingula of left lung, one of the segments of the left lung with a tongue-shape
  - The Sphenoidal lingula, a part of the sphenoid bone
  - The Lingula of mandible, a ridge on the medial aspect of the body of the mandible, just anterior to the mandibular foramen
  - the Lingula of cerebellum
  - Taenia of fourth ventricle
  - In the vasiform orifice of the Aleyrodidae a small, tongue-like organ assisting in the excretion of honeydew

== See also ==
- Lingala (disambiguation)
