= Facies orbitalis =

Facies orbitalis may refer to:

- Facies orbitalis corporis maxillae
- Facies orbitalis ossis zygomatici
