= Masseteric nerve =

Branch of the mandibular nerve

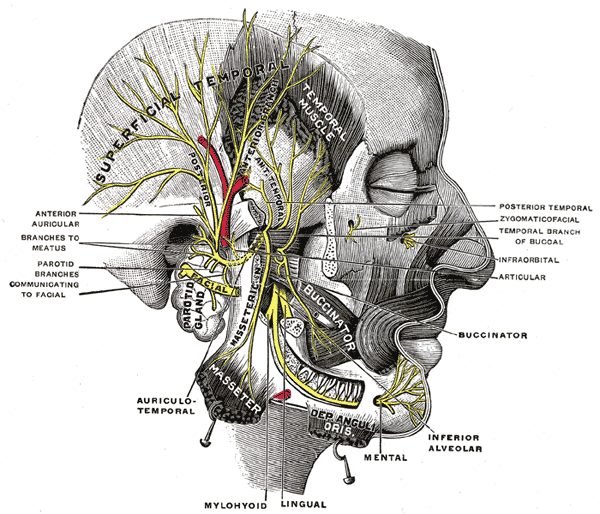
- Mandibular division of the trigeminal nerve. (Masseteric visible near center.)

Details
- From: Mandibular nerve
- Innervates: Masseter muscle, temporomandibular joint

Identifiers
- Latin: nervus massetericus
- TA98: A14.2.01.070
- TA2: 6253
- FMA: 53103

The masseteric nerve is a motor branch of the mandibular nerve (CN V_{3}). It arises in the infratemporal fossa and passes through the mandibular notch to reach masseter muscle. It provides motor innervation the masseter muscle, and sensory innervation to the temporomandibular joint. The nerve is clinically relevant in surgical procedures involving the infratemporal region and in conditions affecting the muscles responsible for mandibular movement.

== Structure ==
=== Origin ===
The masseteric nerve is a branch of (the anterior division of) the mandibular nerve (CN V_{3}) (itself a branch of the trigeminal nerve (CN V)).

=== Course ===
It passes laterally superior to the lateral pterygoid muscle, anterior to the temporomandibular joint, and posterior to the tendon of the temporalis muscle. It crosses (the posterior portion of) the mandibular notch alongside the masseteric artery before branching out upon the surface of the masseter muscle, then entering the muscle.

=== Distribution ===
The masseteric nerve provides motor innervation the masseter muscle. It additionally sends articular (sensory) branches to the temporomandibular joint.

== Clinical significance ==
The masseteric nerve may be harvested and used to repair paralysis of the facial nerve (CN VII).

== See also ==
- Masseteric artery
