= Zygomatico-orbital foramina =

Canals in the skull

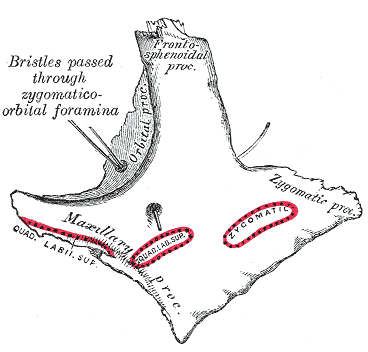
- Left zygomatic bone. Malar surface.

Details

Identifiers
- Latin: foramen zygomaticoorbitale
- TA98: A02.1.14.009
- TA2: 827
- FMA: 53168

The zygomatico-orbital foramina are two canals in the skull, that allow nerves to pass through. The orifices are seen on the orbital process of the zygomatic bone.

One of these canals opens into the temporal fossa, the other on the malar surface of the bone.

The former transmits the zygomaticotemporal, the latter the zygomaticofacial nerve.
