= Zygomatic nerve =

Nerve of the face

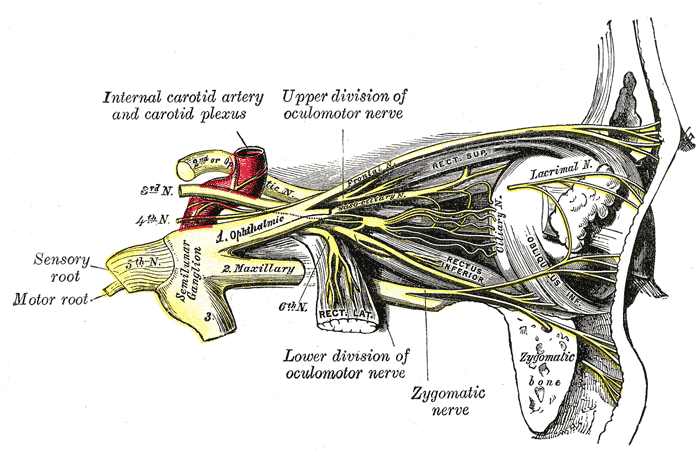
- Lateral view of the nerves of the orbit. The zygomatic nerve is visible at bottom centre branching from the maxillary nerve.

Details
- From: Maxillary nerve
- To: Zygomaticotemporal nerve zygomaticofacial nerve communicating branch to lacrimal nerve
- Innervates: Skin over temporal bone and zygomatic bone

Identifiers
- Latin: nervus zygomaticus
- TA98: A14.2.01.056
- TA2: 6231
- FMA: 52967

The zygomatic nerve is a branch of the maxillary nerve (itself a branch of the trigeminal nerve (CN V)). It arises in the pterygopalatine fossa and enters the orbit through the inferior orbital fissure before dividing into its two terminal branches: the zygomaticotemporal nerve and zygomaticofacial nerve.

Through its branches, the zygomatic nerve provides sensory innervation to skin over the zygomatic bone and the temporal bone. It also carries post-ganglionic parasympathetic axons to the lacrimal gland.

It may be blocked by anaesthetising the maxillary nerve.

== Structure ==
=== Origin ===
The zygomatic nerve is a branch of the maxillary nerve (CN V_{2}). It arises at the pterygopalatine ganglion.

=== Course ===
It exits from the pterygopalatine fossa through the inferior orbital fissure to enter the orbit. In the orbit, it travels anteriorly along its lateral wall.

=== Branches ===
Soon after the zygomatic nerve enters the orbit, it divides into its branches. These include:

- Zygomaticotemporal nerve
- Zygomaticofacial nerve
- A communicating branch to lacrimal nerve

=== Variation ===
Sometimes, the zygomatic nerve does not branch within the orbit. Instead, it enters a single foramen in the zygomatic bone called the zygomatico-orbital foramen. In this case, it divides within the bone into the zygomaticotemporal nerve and the zygomaticofacial nerve.

== Function ==
The terminal branches of the zygomatic nerve contain sensory axons. These provide sensation to the skin over the temporal bone and the zygomatic bone.

The zygomatic nerve also carries postganglionic parasympathetic axons. These axons have their cell bodies in the pterygopalatine ganglion. They travel from the ganglion to the zygomatic nerve, and then to the lacrimal nerve through a communicating branch. From the lacrimal nerve, they enter the lacrimal gland and provide secretomotor supply.

== Clinical significance ==
The zygomatic nerve can be blocked indirectly by anaesthetising the maxillary nerve (CN V_{2}). The zygomatic nerve and its branches may be damaged by a fracture to the zygomatic bone.

== Additional images ==
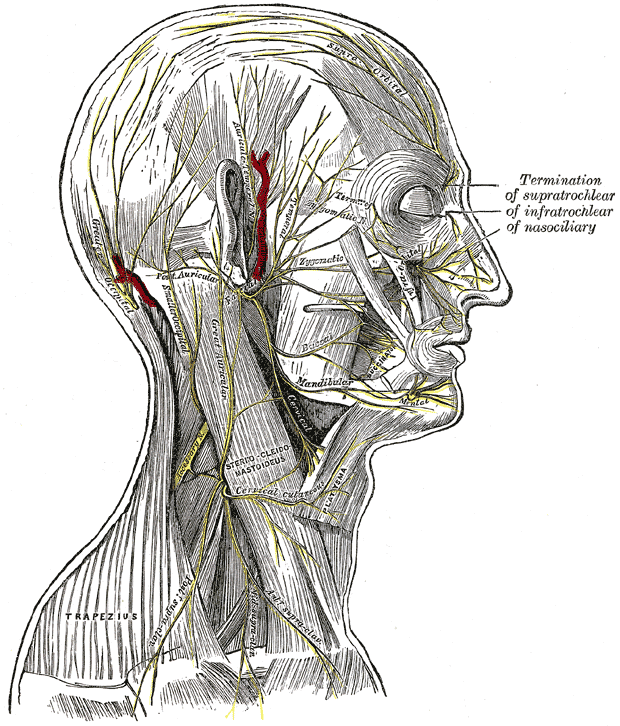
The nerves of the scalp, face, and side of neck.

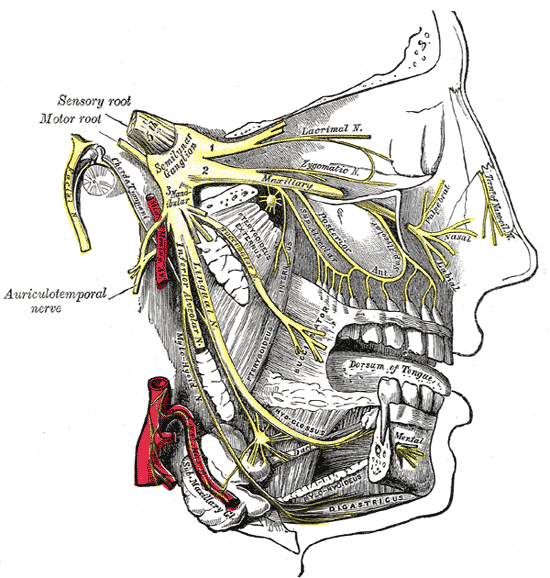
Branches of the trigeminal nerve. The zygomatic nerve is visible branching from the maxillary nerve and entering the orbit.
