= Coronoid process of the mandible =

Area of the mandible (jawbone)

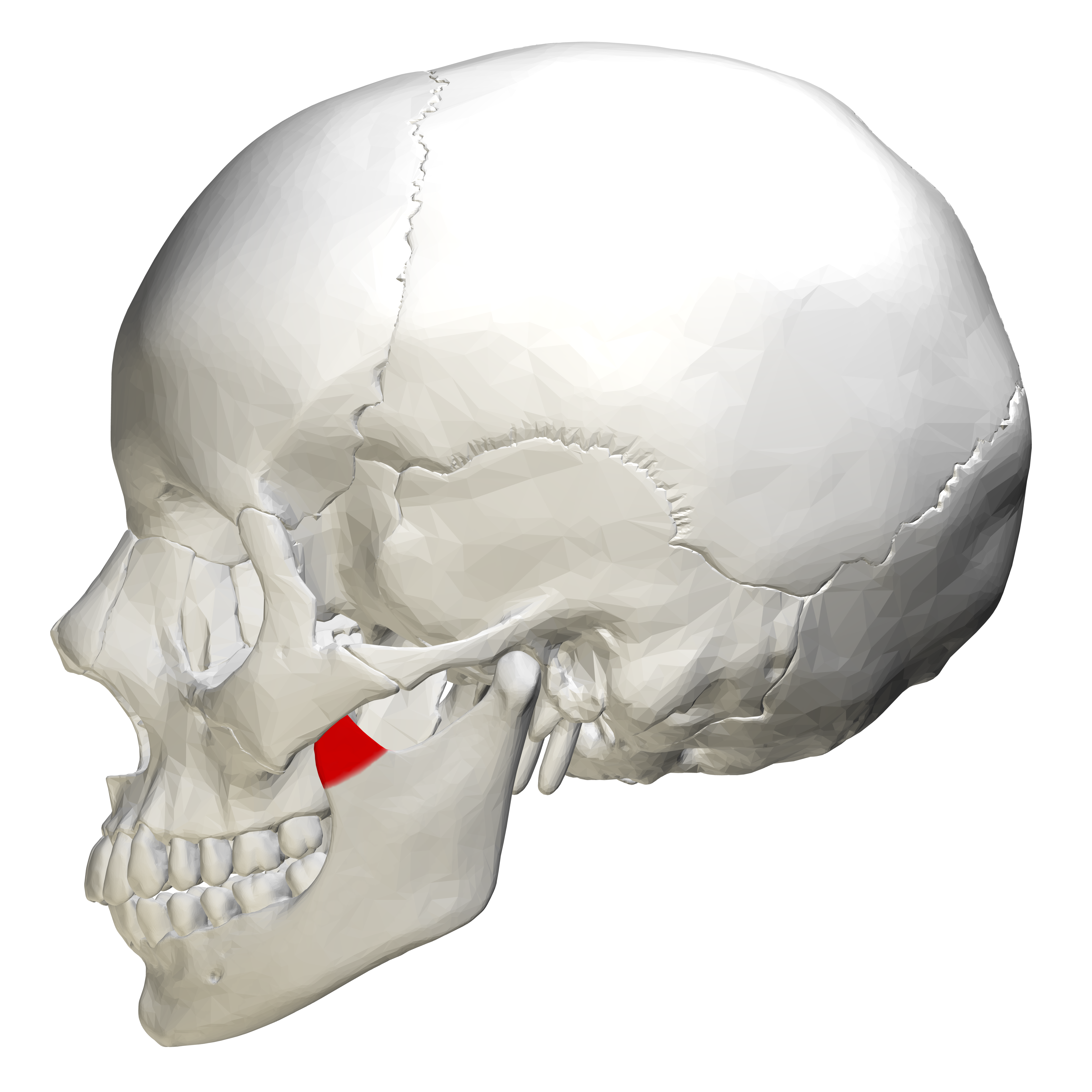
- Position of coronoid process in skull (shown in red)

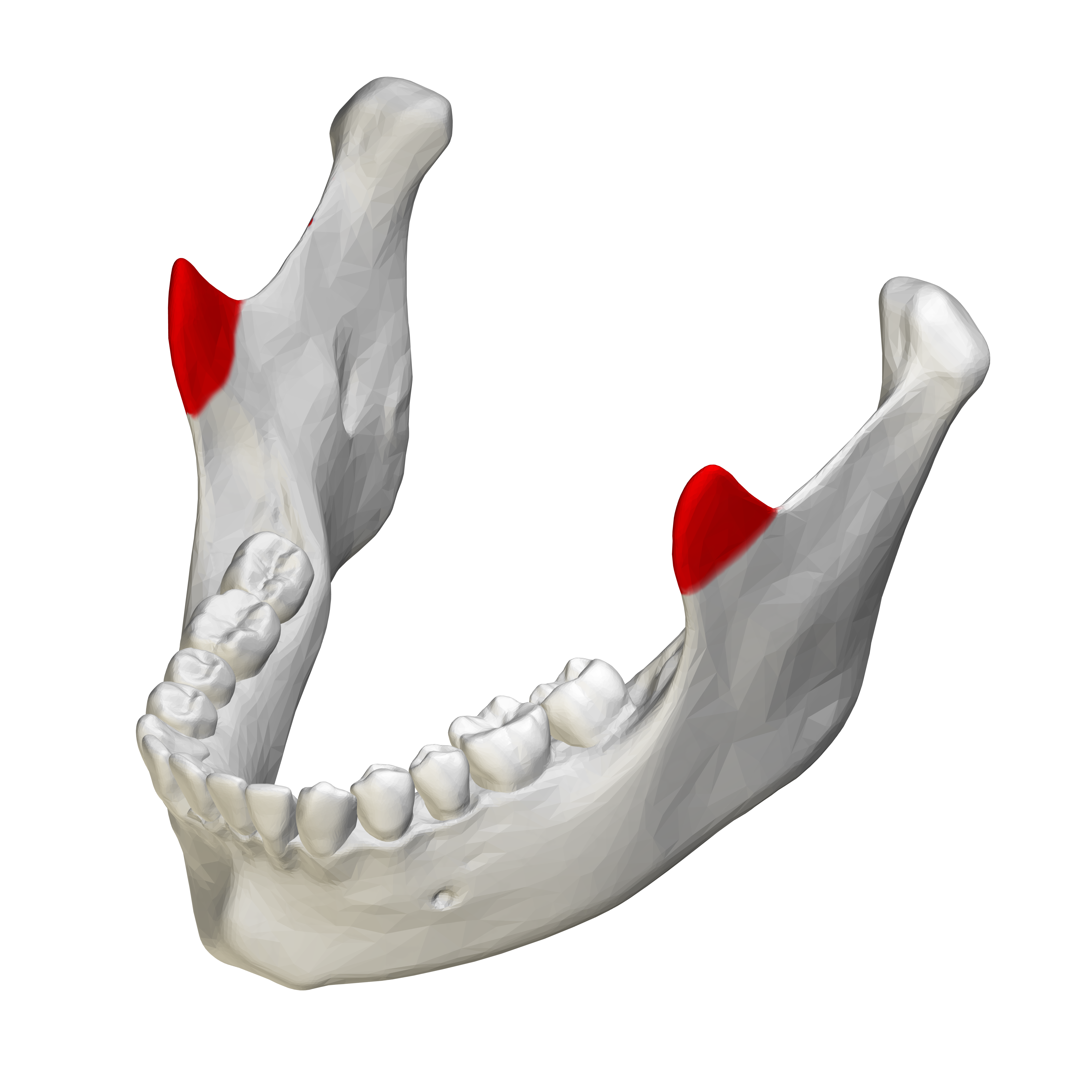
- Position of coronoid process in mandible (shown in red)

Details
- Part of: Mandible
- System: Skeletal

Identifiers
- Latin: processus coronoideus mandibulae
- TA98: A02.1.15.032
- TA2: 869
- FMA: 52833

In human anatomy, the mandible's coronoid process (from Greek korōnē 'hooked') is a thin, triangular eminence, which is flattened from side to side and varies in shape and size. Its anterior border is convex and is continuous below with the anterior border of the ramus. Its posterior border is concave and forms the anterior boundary of the mandibular notch. The lateral surface is smooth, and affords insertion to the temporalis and masseter muscles. Its medial surface gives insertion to the temporalis, and presents a ridge which begins near the apex of the process and runs downward and forward to the inner side of the last molar tooth.

Between this ridge and the anterior border is a grooved triangular area, the upper part of which gives attachment to the temporalis, the lower part to some fibers of the buccinator.

== Clinical significance ==
Fractures of the mandible are common. However, coronoid process fractures are very rare. Isolated fractures of the coronoid process caused by direct trauma are rare, as it is anatomically protected by the complex zygomatic arch/ temporo-zygomatic bone and their associated muscles. Most fractures here are caused by strokes (contusion or penetrating injuries). Conservative management of minor fractures can lead to trismus (lockjaw) that can later only be corrected by removing the coronoid process. For serious fractures, a surgery involving open reduction and internal fixation can have good outcomes.

== Additional images ==
Position of coronoid process in skull (shown in red)

Position of coronoid process in mandible (shown in red)

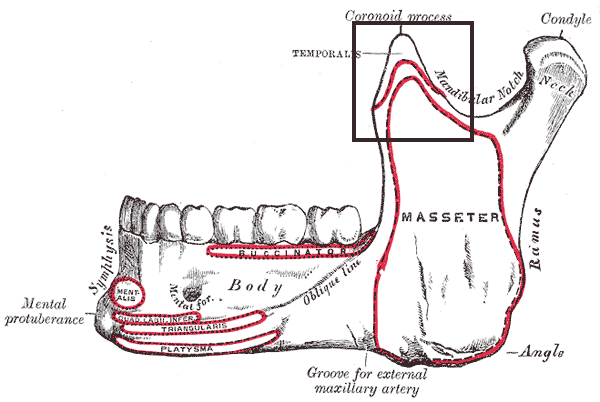
Mandible outer surface (side view; coronoid process labeled at top center)

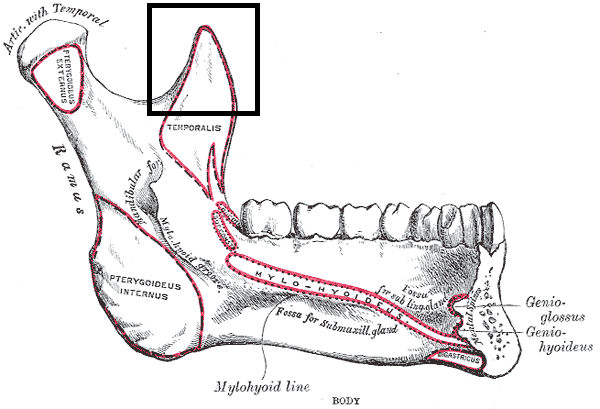
Medial surface

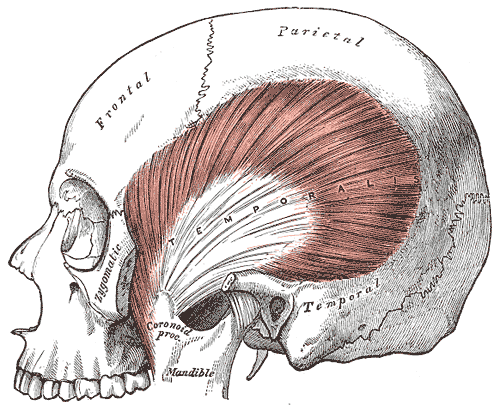
The temporalis, with the zygomatic arch and masseter removed

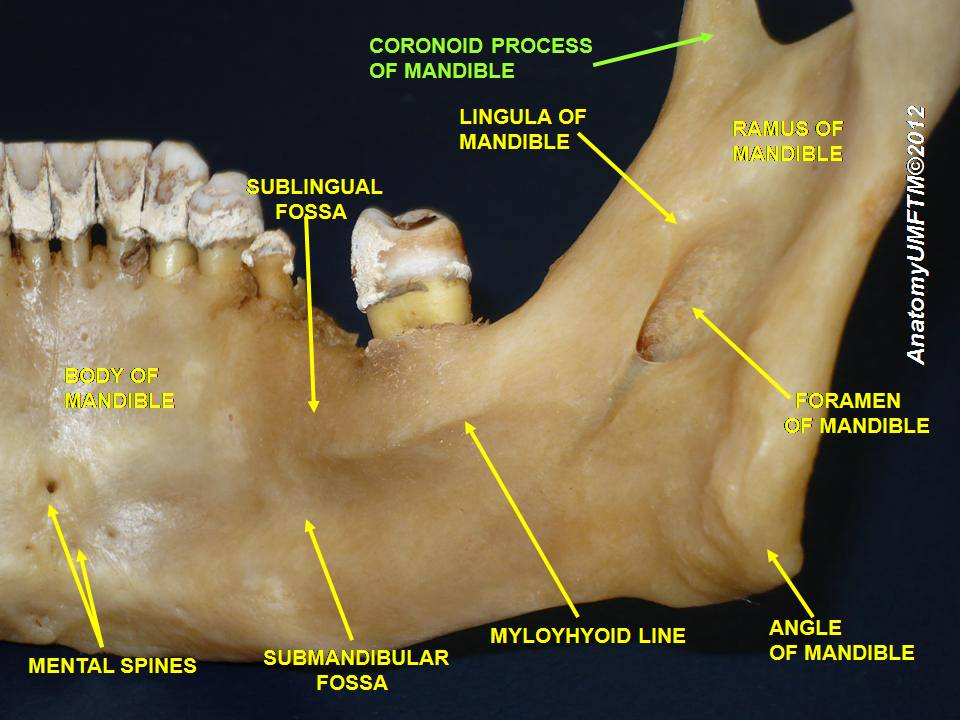
Coronoid process of mandible

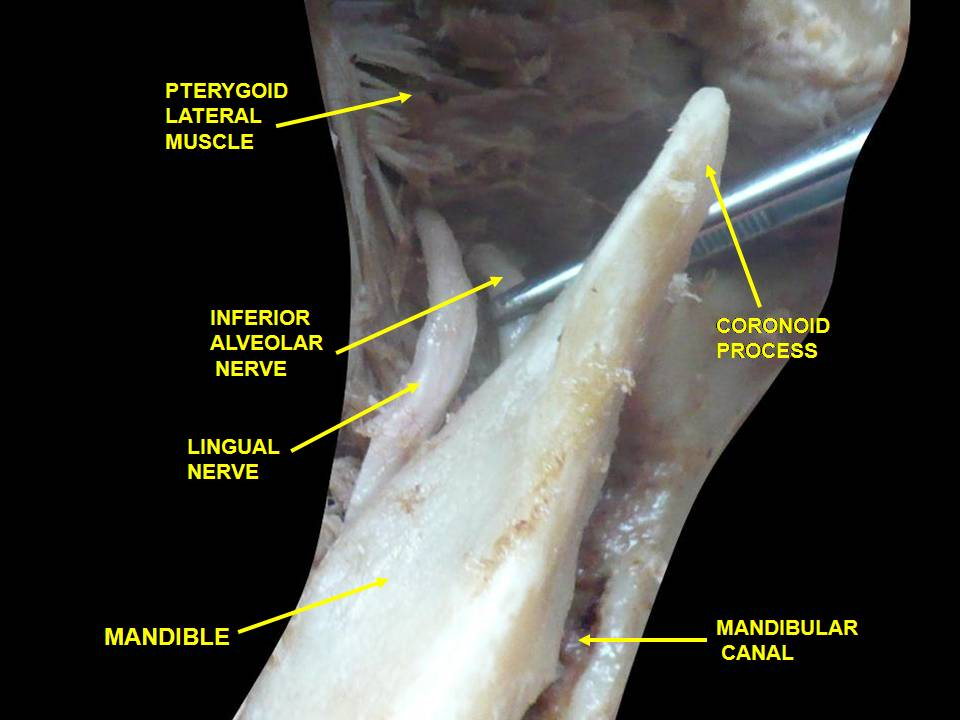
Deep dissection of the mandibular nerve and bone (anterior view)

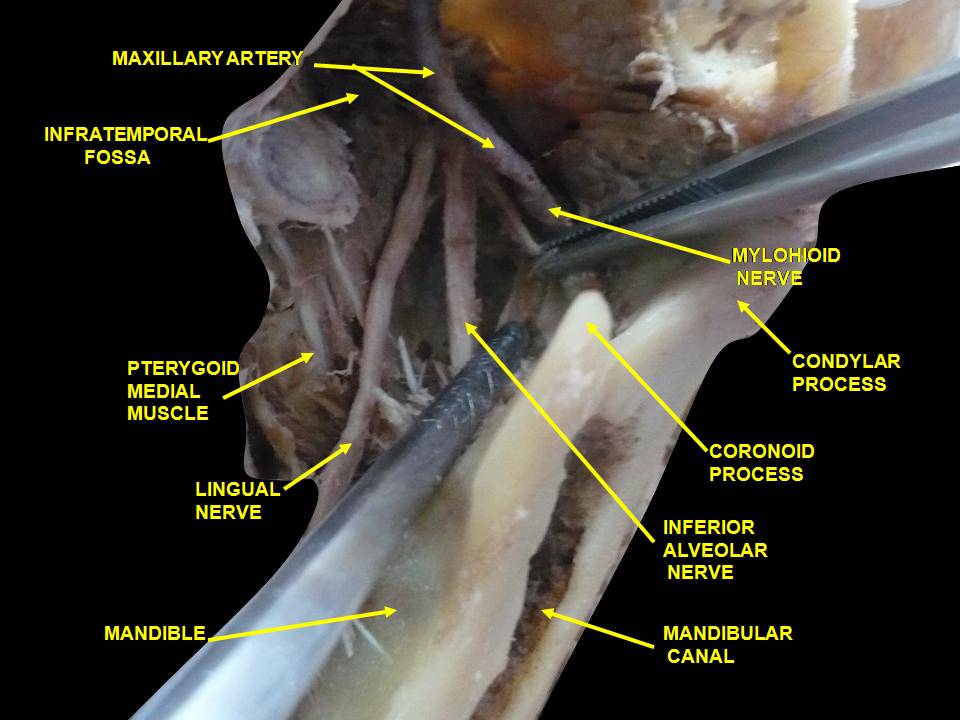
Deep dissection of the infratemporal fossa, showing the lingual and inferior alveolar nerve (anterolateral view)

== See also ==
- Ramus mandibulae
