= Mandibular notch =

Groove in the ramus of the mandible

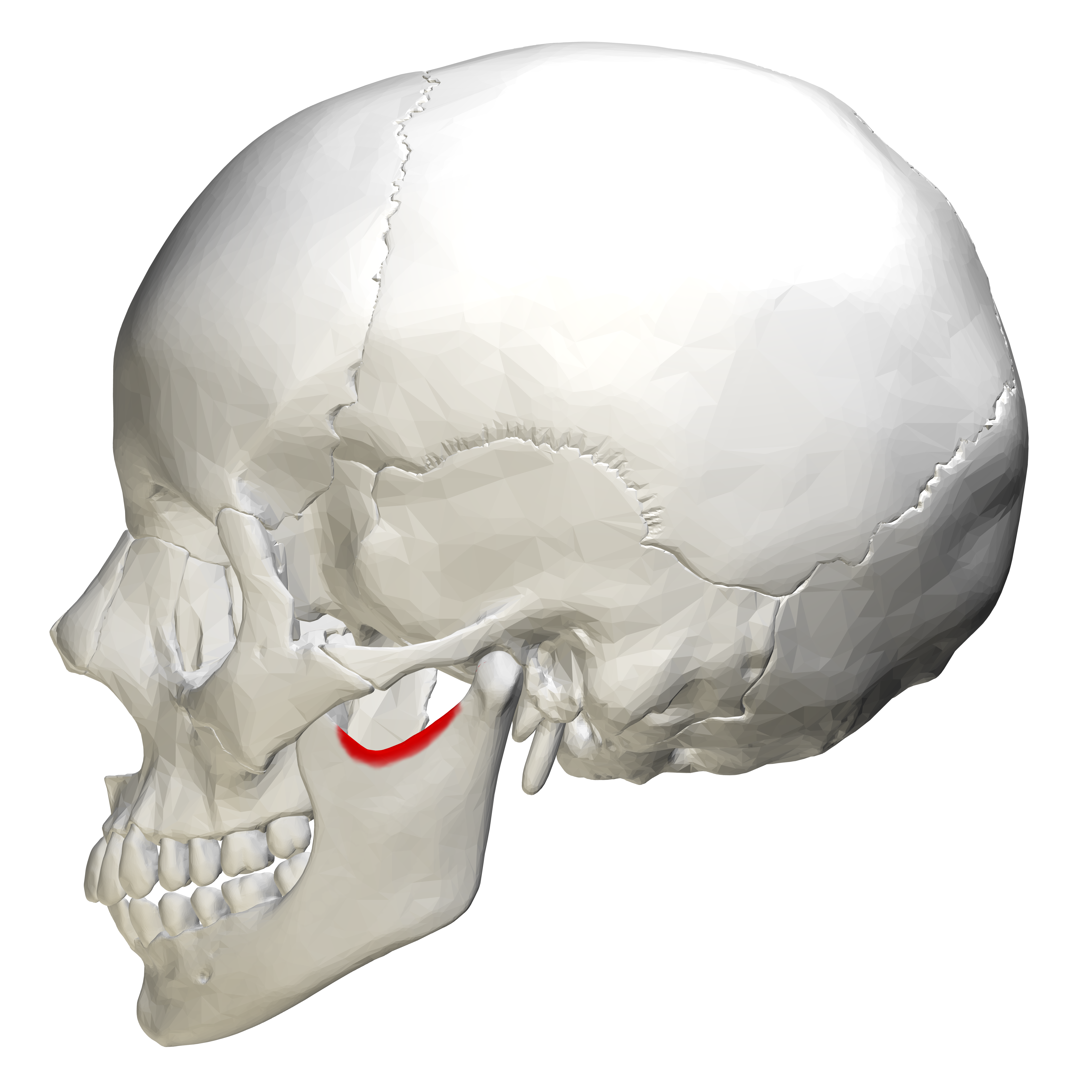
- Position of mandibular notch in skull, shown in red.

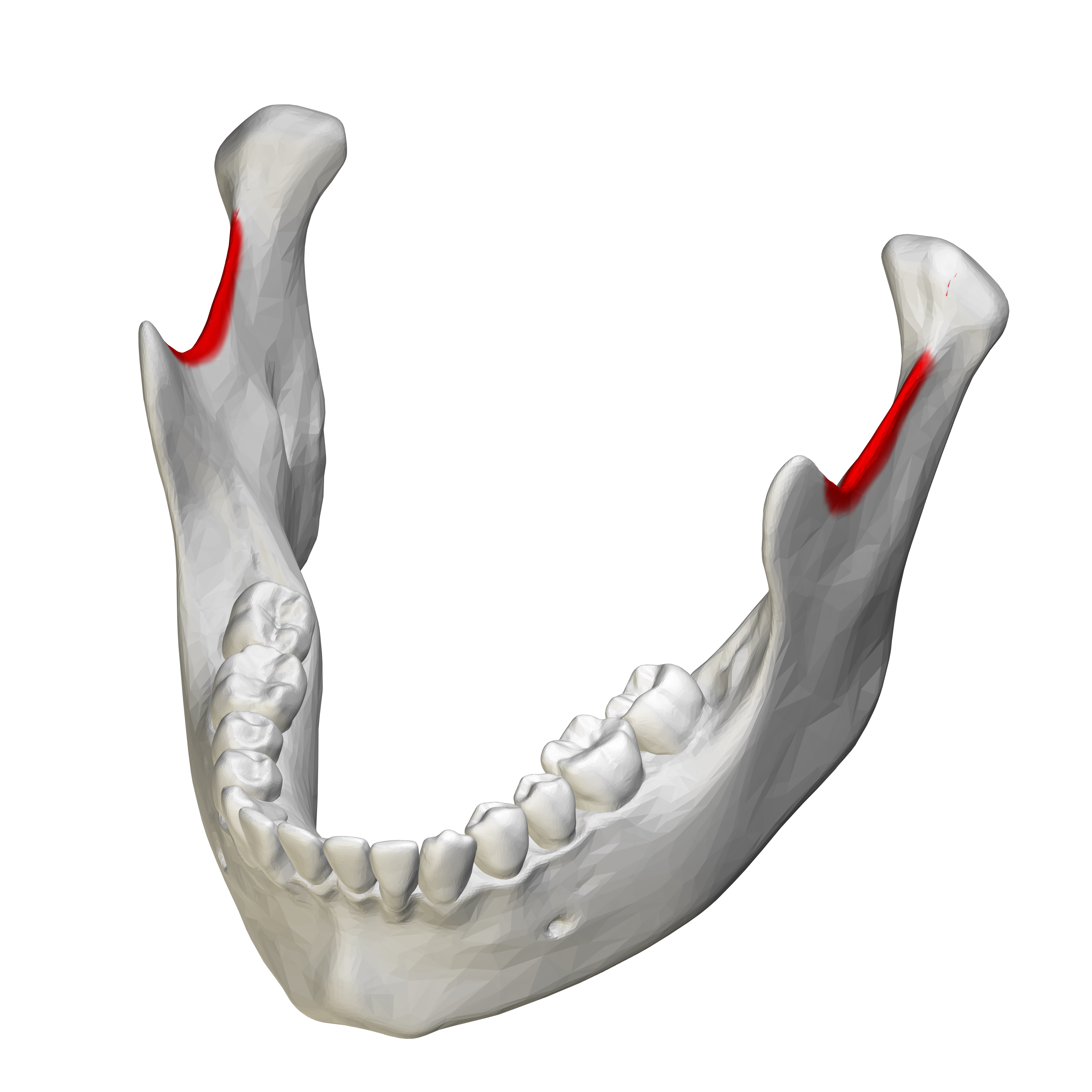
- Position of mandibular notch in mandible, shown in red.

Details
- Part of: mandible
- System: skeletal

Identifiers
- Latin: incisura mandibulae
- TA98: A02.1.15.034; A02.1.15.008
- TA2: 871
- FMA: 59481

The mandibular notch, also known as the sigmoid notch, is a groove in the ramus of the mandible. It is the gap between the coronoid process anteriorly and the condyloid process posteriorly.

== Structure ==
The mandibular notch is a concave groove at the top of the ramus of the mandible. It is the gap between the coronoid process anteriorly and the condyloid process posteriorly.

== Function ==
The mandibular notch allows for the passage of the masseteric nerve (a branch of the mandibular nerve (V3) division of the trigeminal nerve), the masseteric artery, and the masseteric vein.

== Clinical significance ==
The mandibular notch may be palpated to locate the parotid duct, the facial artery, the facial vein, and the medial pterygoid muscle.

== Other animals ==
The mandibular notch can be found in other mammals, such as dogs and cats. There can be significant variation in its shape even within the same species. Archaeological evidence shows that the mandibular notch is different in other hominidae, such as neanderthals, and may be asymmetrical.

== Additional images ==
Position of mandibular notch in skull, shown in red.

Position of mandibular notch in mandible, shown in red.

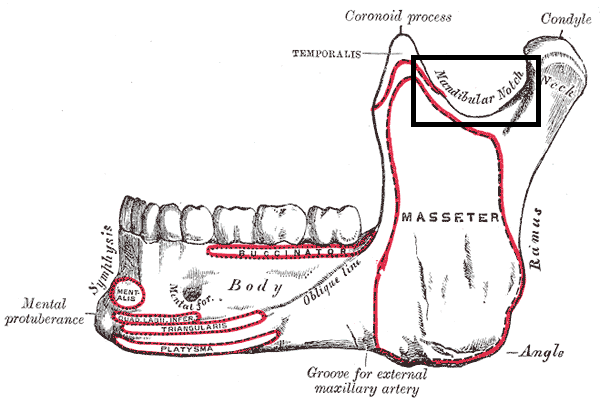
Outer surface of mandible. Mandibular notch is labelled at top right.
