= Zygomaticotemporal nerve =

Small nerve of the face

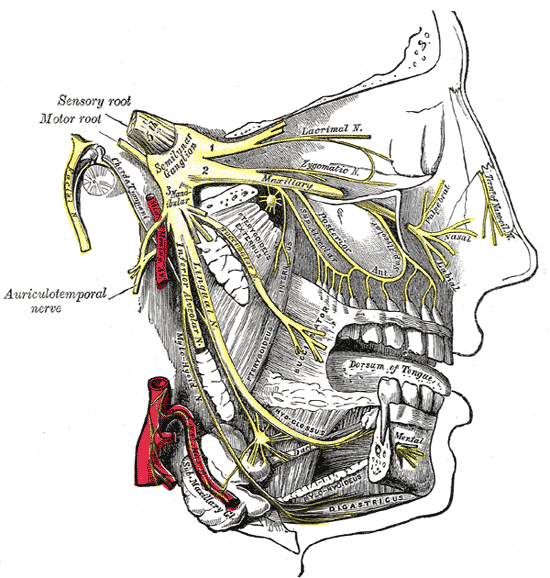
- Distribution of the maxillary and mandibular nerves and the submaxillary ganglion

Details
- From: Maxillary nerve
- Innervates: Skin on side of forehead

Identifiers
- Latin: ramus zygomaticotemporalis nervi zygomatici
- TA98: A14.2.01.057
- TA2: 6232
- FMA: 52972

The zygomaticotemporal nerve (zygomaticotemporal branch, temporal branch) is a cutaneous (sensory) nerve of the head. It is a branch of the zygomatic nerve (itself a branch of the maxillary nerve (CN V_{2})). It arises in the orbit and exits the orbit through the zygomaticotemporal foramen in the zygomatic bone to enter the temporal fossa. It is distributed to the skin of the side of the forehead. It also contains a parasympathetic secretomotor component for the lacrimal gland which it confers to the lacrimal nerve (which then delivers it to the gland).

== Structure ==
=== Origin ===
The zygomaticotemporal nerve is a branch of the zygomatic nerve.

=== Course ===
It passes along the lateral wall of the orbit in a groove in the zygomatic bone.

It passes through the zygomaticotemporal foramen of the zygomatic bone to emerge (at the anterior portion of) the temporal fossa.

In the temporal fossa, it passes superior-ward between the two layers of the temporal fascia, between the temporal bone and temporalis muscle. It pierces the temporal fascia about 2 cm superior to the zygomatic arch.

As it pierces the deep layer of temporal fascia, it issues a small branch which runs between the two layers of the temporalis fascia to the lateral angle of the orbit.

=== Distribution ===
The nerve provides sensory innervation to a small area of skin over the temple superior to the zygomatic arch.

=== Communications ===
The zygomaticotemporal nerve communicates with the facial nerve (CN VII) (in most individuals), the lacrimal nerve (a branch of the ophthalmic nerve (CN V1)), and the auriculotemporal nerve (a branch of the mandibular nerve (CN V_{3})).

- The zygomaticotemporal nerve confers a parasympathetic secretomotor communicating branch (containing post-ganglionic fibres for the lacrimal gland from the pterygopalatine ganglion) to the lacrimal nerve at the superior portion of the lateral wall of the orbit.

=== Variation ===
Sometimes, the zygomaticotemporal nerve replaces the lacrimal nerve and vice versa.
