= Lingula of mandible =

Bony ridge on the medial side of the mandible

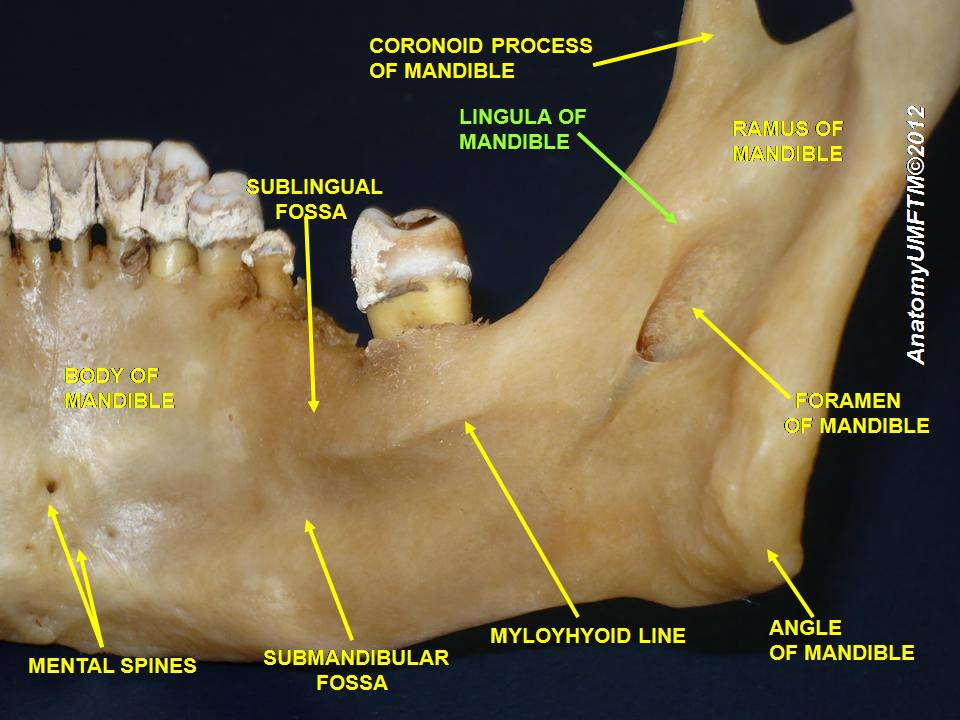
- Lingula of mandible (green color)

Details
- Part of: mandible
- System: skeletal

Identifiers
- Latin: lingula mandibulae
- TA98: A02.1.15.029
- TA2: 866
- FMA: 59470

The lingula of the mandible is a prominent bony ridge on the medial side of the mandible. It is next to the mandibular foramen. It gives attachment to the sphenomandibular ligament.

== Structure ==
The lingula of the mandible is a prominent bony ridge on the medial side of the mandible. It is next to the mandibular foramen. It has a notch from which the mylohyoid groove originates. It gives attachment to the sphenomandibular ligament.

=== Variation ===
The lingula of the mandible can take many shapes, including triangular, truncated, and nodular. In a majority of people, this shape is symmetrical.

== See also ==
- Lingula
