= Masseteric artery =

- Plan of branches of internal maxillary artery. (Masseteric visible at bottom center.)

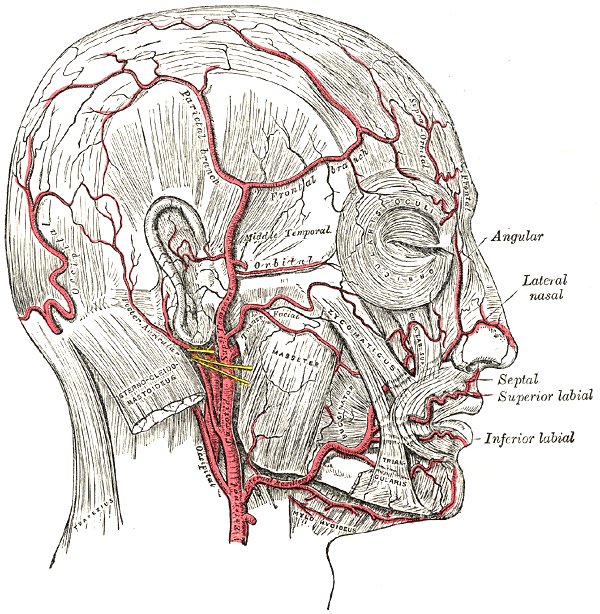
- The arteries of the face and scalp. (Masseteric artery not labeled, but masseter muscle visible near center.)

Details
- Source: Maxillary artery
- Supplies: Masseter muscle

Identifiers
- Latin: arteria masseterica
- TA98: A12.2.05.070
- TA2: 4439
- FMA: 49739

The masseteric artery is small and passes laterally through the mandibular notch to the deep surface of the masseter muscle, which it supplies.

It anastomoses with the masseteric branches of the external maxillary artery and with the transverse facial artery.

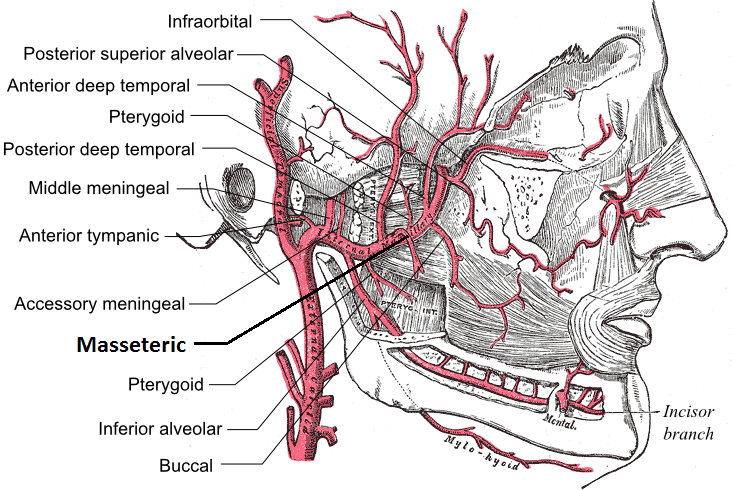
Branches of the maxillary artery

== See also ==
- Masseteric nerve
