= Lingala, Vatsavai mandal =

Lingala
- Village
- Interactive map of Lingala
- Location in Andhra Pradesh, India
- Coordinates: 16°57′12″N 80°13′14″E
- Country: India
- State: Andhra Pradesh
- District: NTR
- Mandal: Vatsavai

Government
  - Type: Panchayati raj
  - Body: Lingala gram panchayat

Area
  - Total: 678 ha (1,680 acres)

Population (2011)
  - Total: 1,763
  - Density: 260/km^{2} (673/sq mi)

Languages
  - Official: Telugu
- Time zone: UTC+5:30 (IST)
- Area code: +91–
- Vehicle registration: AP

Lingala is a village in NTR district of the Indian state of Andhra Pradesh. It is located in Vatsavai mandal of Vijayawada revenue division.
