= Lingala, Khammam district =

Lingala
- Village
- Location in Telangana, India Lingala (India)
- Coordinates: 17°09′20″N 80°30′45″E
- Country: India
- State: Telangana
- District: Khammam

Languages
  - Official: Telugu
- Time zone: UTC+5:30 (IST)
- PIN: 507209
- Telephone code: 08761
- Vehicle registration: TS
- Website: telangana.gov.in

Lingala is a village in the Khammam district, in the state of Telangana, India. It is located 6 km from its local Mandal at Kalluru

== Demographics ==
There are approximately 1000 households in the village.
