= Lacrimal nerve =

Branch of the ophthalmic nerve

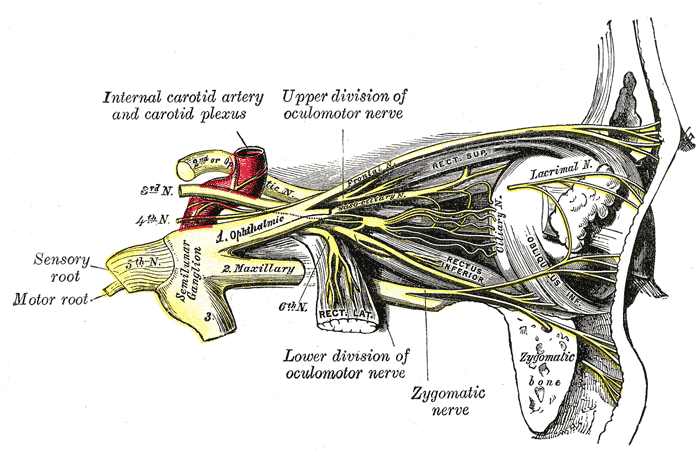
- Nerves of the orbit, the lacrimal nerve is visible, labelled over the eye.

Details
- From: Ophthalmic nerve
- Innervates: Lacrimal gland, conjunctiva, skin of lateral forehead, scalp and upper eyelid

Identifiers
- Latin: nervus lacrimalis
- TA98: A14.2.01.018
- TA2: 6198
- FMA: 52628

The lacrimal nerve is the smallest of the three main branches of the ophthalmic nerve (CN V_{1}) (itself a branch of the trigeminal nerve (CN V)).

It enters the orbit outside the common tendinous ring and passes forward along the side wall of the orbit.

It provides sensory innervation to the skin and both surfaces of conjunctiva at the lateral portion of the upper eyelid.

It also receives a parasympathetic secretomotor communicating branch for the lacrimal gland which it conveys to the gland.

== Structure ==
=== Origin ===
The lacrimal nerve branches from the ophthalmic nerve immediately before traveling through the superior orbital fissure to enter the orbit.

At the superior portion of the lateral wall of the orbit, it also receives a secretomotor communicating parasympathetic branch from the zygomaticotemporal nerve for the lacrimal gland.

=== Course ===
It enters the orbit through the superior orbital fissure outside (lateral to) the common tendinous ring, coursing lateral to the frontal nerve and trochlear nerve (CN IV). Once inside the orbit, it travels anteriorly along (the superior portion of) the lateral wall of the orbit upon the superior margin of the lateral rectus muscle; here, it receives a secretomotor branch for the lacrimal gland from the zygomaticotemporal nerve. It is accompanied by the lacrimal artery along its course through the orbit. It travels through the lacrimal gland, supplying the gland with sensory and parasympathetic branches, then continuing anteriorly as a few small sensory branches. It pierces the orbital septum to reach its terminal target tissues.

=== Distribution ===
==== Sensory ====
The lacrimal nerve provides sensory innervation to:

- the lacrimal gland
- a small area of skin over the lateral portion of the upper eyelid
- both surfaces (i.e. ocular and palpebral) of the conjunctiva at the lateral portion of the upper eyelid (i.e. the conjunctiva at the superior fornix)
- skin of the lateral forehead and scalp.

==== Parasympathetic ====
At the superior portion of the lateral wall of the orbit, the lacrimal nerve receives a secretomotor communicating parasympathetic branch (containing post-ganglionic fibres for the lacrimal gland from the pterygopalatine ganglion) from the zygomaticotemporal nerve which it conveys to the lacrimal gland.

=== Variation ===
Occasionally, the lacrimal nerve is replaced by the zygomaticotemporal nerve, and vice versa.

== Additional images ==
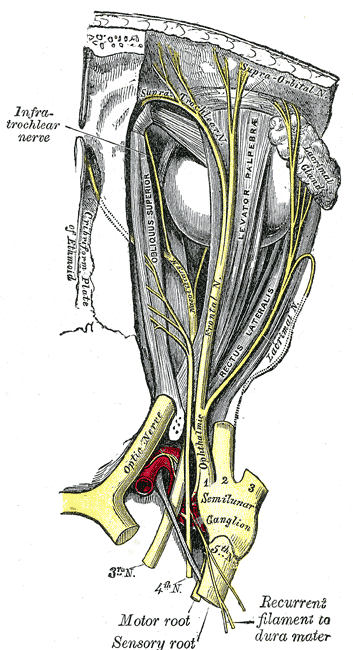
Superior view of the nerves of the orbit. The lacrimal nerve is seen branching from the ophthalmic nerve.

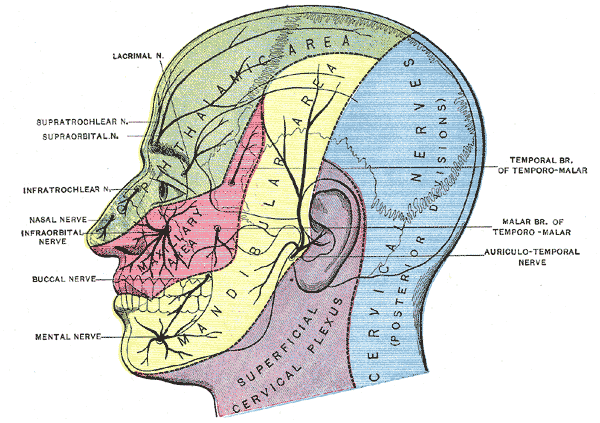
Sensory innervation to the skin of the head and neck. The cutaneous distribution of the lacrimal nerve can be seen above the eye in the green area.

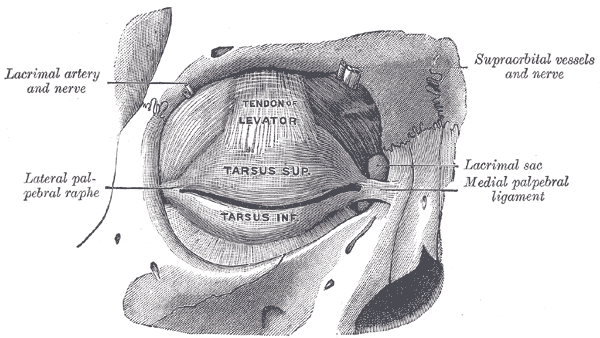
Anterior view of the orbit and tarsal plates. The lacrimal nerve can be seen exiting the orbit superolaterally after it supplies the lacrimal gland.

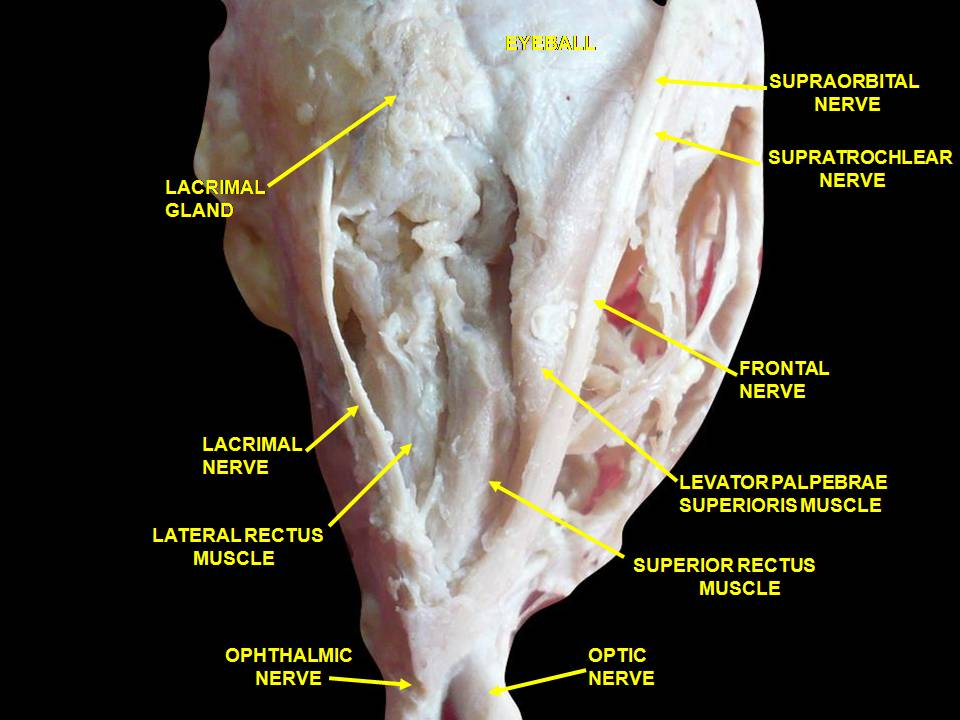
Superior view of a dissection of the left orbit. The lacrimal nerve is visible innervating the lacrimal gland.
