= Zygomaticofacial nerve =

Branch of the maxillary nerve

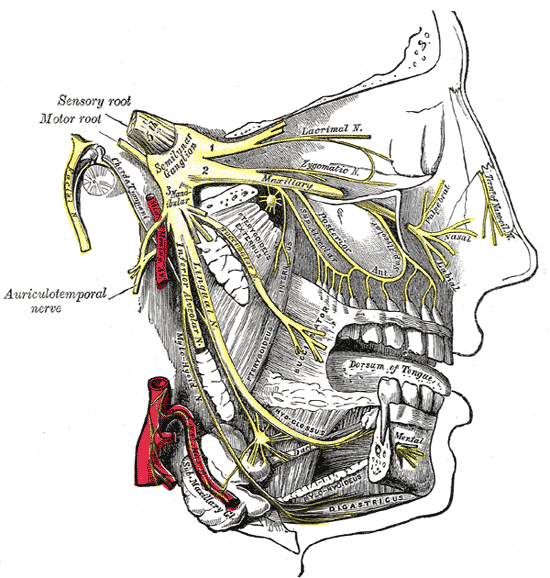
- Distribution of the maxillary and mandibular nerves, and the submaxillary ganglion (zygomaticofacial not labeled, but region visible)

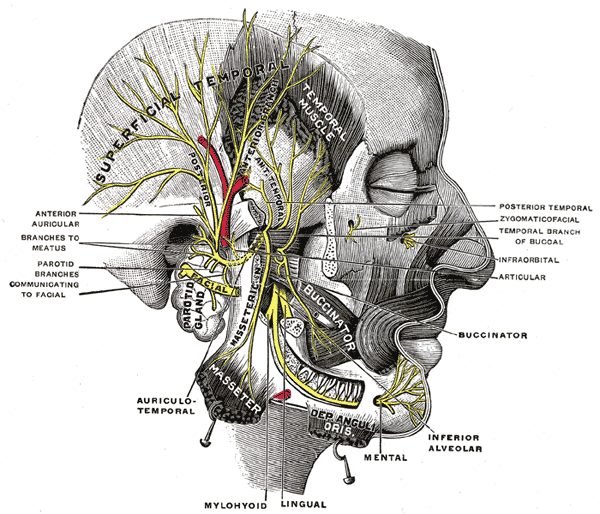
- Mandibular division of the trifacial nerve (zygomaticofacial labeled at center right)

Details
- From: Zygomatic nerve
- Innervates: Prominence of the cheek

Identifiers
- Latin: ramus zygomaticofacialis nervi zygomatici
- TA98: A14.2.01.058
- TA2: 6234
- FMA: 52973

The zygomaticofacial nerve (or zygomaticofacial branch of zygomatic nerve or malar branch of zygomatic nerve) is a cutaneous (sensory) branch of the maxillary nerve (CN V_{2}) that arises within the orbit. The zygomaticofacial nerve penetrates the inferolateral angle of the orbit, emerging into the face through the zygomaticofacial foramen, then penetrates the orbicularis oculi muscle to reach and innervate the skin of the prominence of the cheek.

== Anatomy ==
=== Communications ===
The zygomaticofacial nerve forms a nerve plexus with the zygomatic branches of facial nerve (CN VII), and the inferior palpebral branches of maxillary nerve (V_{2}).

=== Variation ===
The nerve may sometimes be absent.
