= Lingala, Mandavalli mandal =

Lingala
- Village
- Interactive map of Lingala
- Location in Andhra Pradesh, India Lingala (India)
- Coordinates: 16.4702°N 81.1502°E
- Country: India
- State: Andhra Pradesh
- District: Eluru
- Mandal: Mandavalli

Area
  - Total: 6.91 km^{2} (2.67 sq mi)

Population (2011)
  - Total: 3,088
  - Density: 447/km^{2} (1,160/sq mi)

Languages
  - Official: Telugu
- Time zone: UTC+5:30 (IST)

Lingala is a village in Eluru district of the Indian state of Andhra Pradesh. It is located in Mandavalli mandal of Gudivada revenue division.
