= Zygomaticofacial foramen =

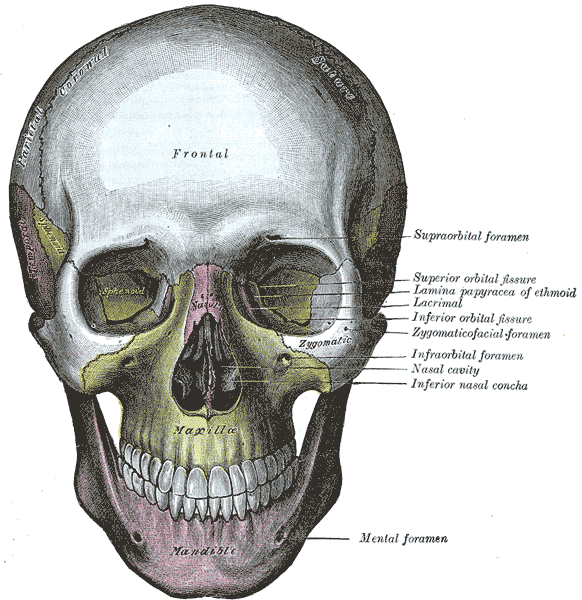
- The skull seen from front (zygomaticofacial foramen labeled at center right)

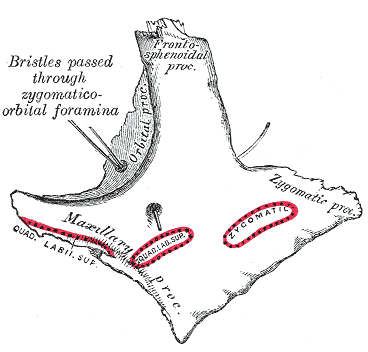
- Left zygomatic bone. Malar surface.

Details

Identifiers
- Latin: foramen zygomaticofaciale
- TA98: A02.1.14.010
- TA2: 828
- FMA: 53169

The zygomaticofacial foramen is a small opening upon the lateral (facial) surface of the zygomatic bone near the bone's orbital border. It gives passage to the zygomaticofacial nerve, artery, and vein. It is often doubled; it is sometimes absent.

Inferior to the foramen is a slight elevation which gives origin to the zygomaticus muscle.
