= Masseter muscle =

One of the masticatory muscles in mammals

Masseter
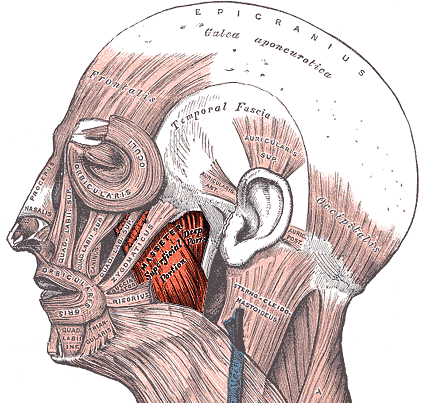
- The left masseter muscle (red highlight), partially covered by superficial muscles such as the platysma muscle (below) and both the zygomaticus major and minor muscles

Details
- Origin: Zygomatic arch and maxillary process of zygomatic bone
- Insertion: Angle surface of ramus of mandible, coronoid process
- Artery: Masseteric artery
- Nerve: Mandibular nerve (V3)
- Actions: Elevation (as in closing of the mouth) and protrusion of mandible

Identifiers
- Latin: musculus masseter
- MeSH: D008406
- TA98: A04.1.04.002
- TA2: 2105
- FMA: 48996

In anatomy, the masseter (Note: The word masseter (usually /məˈsiːtər/, sometimes /ˈmæsɪtər/) comes through Neo-Latin from Greek μασᾶσθαι masasthai, "to chew".) is one of the muscles of mastication. Found only in mammals, it is particularly powerful in herbivores to facilitate chewing of plant matter. The most obvious muscle of mastication is the masseter muscle, since it is the most superficial and one of the strongest.

== Structure ==
The masseter is a thick, somewhat quadrilateral muscle, consisting of three heads, superficial, deep and coronoid. The fibers of superficial and deep heads are continuous at their insertion.

=== Superficial head ===
The superficial head, the larger, arises by a thick, tendinous aponeurosis from the zygomatic process of the maxilla, the temporal process of the zygomatic bone and from the anterior two-thirds of the inferior border of the zygomatic arch. Its fibers pass inferior and posterior, to be inserted into the angle of the mandible and inferior half of the lateral surface of the ramus of the mandible.

=== Deep head ===
The deep head is much smaller, and more muscular in texture. It arises from the posterior third of the lower border and from the whole of the medial surface of the zygomatic arch. Its fibers pass downward and forward, to be inserted into the upper half of the ramus as high as the coronoid process of the mandible. The deep head of the muscle is partly concealed, anteriorly, by the superficial portion. Posteriorly, it is covered by the parotid gland.

=== Coronoid head ===
The coronoid head of the masseter's tendon and muscle fibers run posterolaterally from the coronoid process of the mandible towards the posterior third of the zygomatic arch. Its function is believed to be the retraction of the mandible and the stabilization of the mandibular coronoid process.

=== Innervation ===
Along with the other three muscles of mastication (temporalis, medial pterygoid, and lateral pterygoid), the masseter is innervated by the anterior division of the mandibular division (V3) of the trigeminal nerve. The innervation pathway is: gyrus precentralis > genu capsula interna > nucleus motorius nervi trigemini > nervus trigeminus > nervus mandibularis > musculus masseter.

== Function ==
The action of the muscle during bilateral contraction of the entire muscle is to elevate the mandible, raising the lower jaw. Elevation of the mandible occurs during the closing of the jaws. The masseter parallels the medial pterygoid muscle, but it is stronger and superficial fibres can cause protrusion.

== Clinical significance ==
=== Pathology ===
The masseter muscle can become enlarged in patients who habitually clench or grind (with bruxism) their teeth and even in those who constantly chew gum. This masseteric hypertrophy is asymptomatic and soft; it is usually bilateral but can be unilateral. Even if the hypertrophy is bilateral, asymmetry of the face may still occur due to unequal enlargement of the muscles. This extraoral enlargement may be confused with parotid salivary gland disease, dental infections, and maxillofacial neoplasms. However, no other signs are present except those involved in changes in occlusion intraorally such as pain, and the enlargement corresponds with the outline of the muscle. Most patients seek medical attention because of comments about facial appearance, and this situation may be associated with further pathology of the temporomandibular joint.

Finally, the muscle undergoes spasm with malignant hyperthermia as do other skeletal muscles, but this one is easily noted, since it is on the face.

Singers often experience various kinds of masseter tension, which is often treated with transdermal massages or stretches as a vocal warm-up.

== In other animals ==
The masseter muscle's positioning is a distinguishing feature of hystricognathous creatures such as mole-rats, where it passes partially through the infraorbital foramen and connects to the bone on the opposite side.

In toothed whales, the masseter muscle, made redundant due to a shift in ingesting food from chewing to swallowing, provides the tissue for acoustic fat bodies, including the melon, used for echolocation.

== Additional images ==
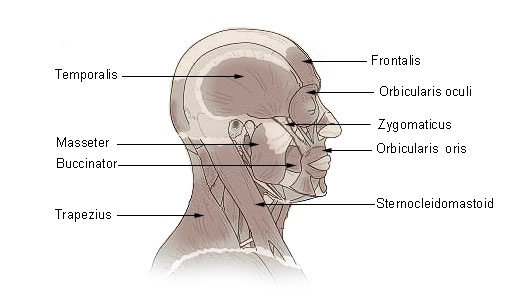
Muscles of the head and neck.

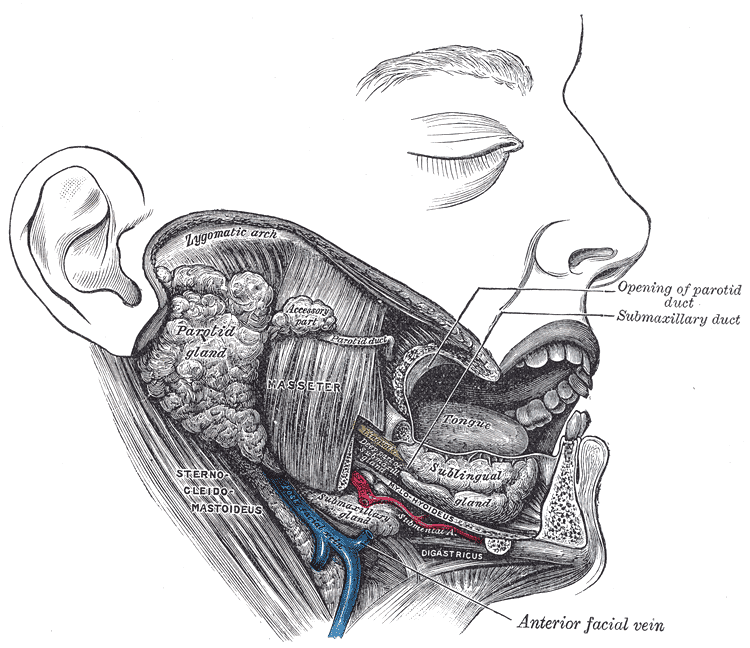
Dissection, showing salivary glands of right side (Masseter visible at center)

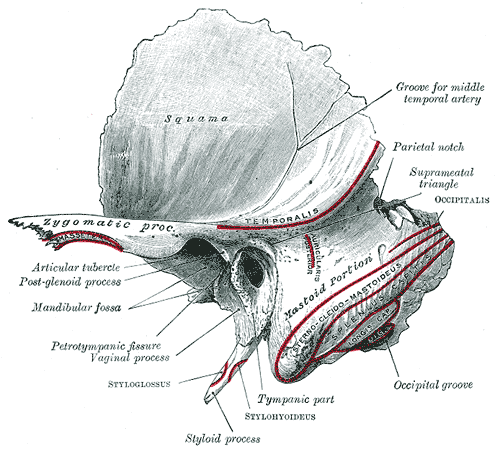
Left temporal bone, outer surface

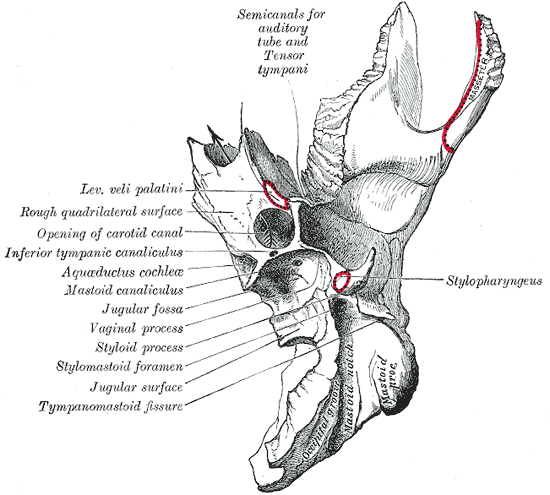
Left temporal bone, inferior surface

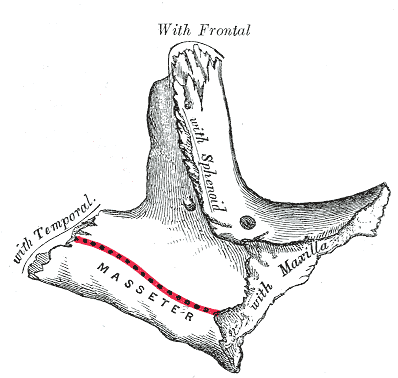
Left zygomatic bone, temporal surface

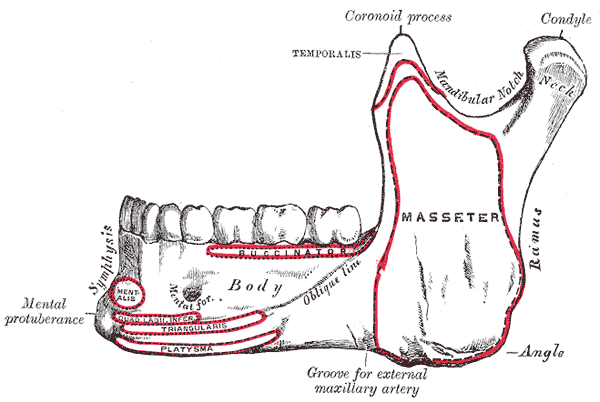
Mandible, outer surface, side view

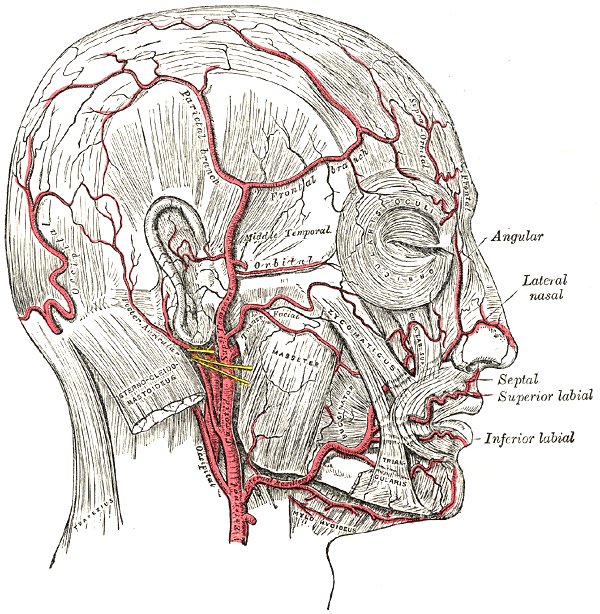
The arteries of the face and scalp.

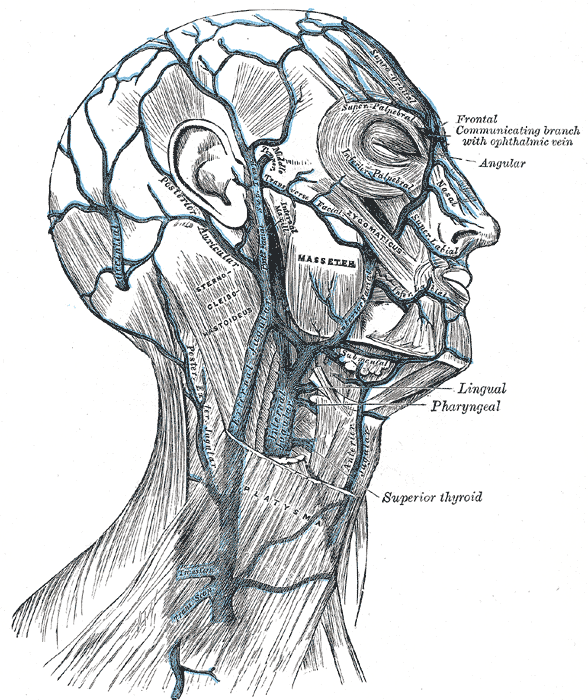
Veins of the head and neck.

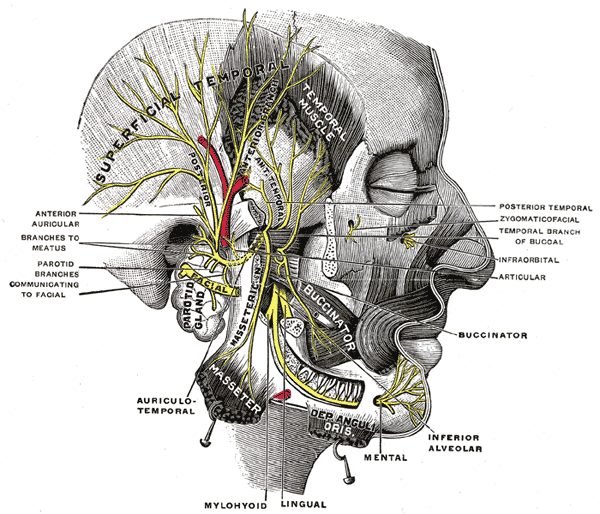
Mandibular division of the trifacial nerve.

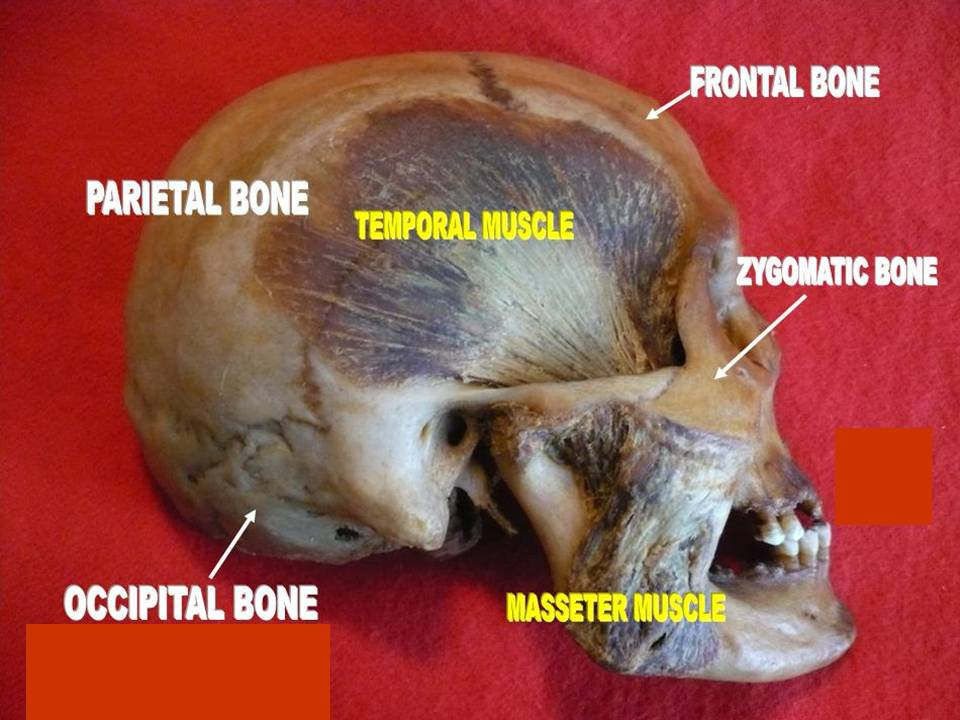
Masseter muscle. Deep dissection. Mummification process.

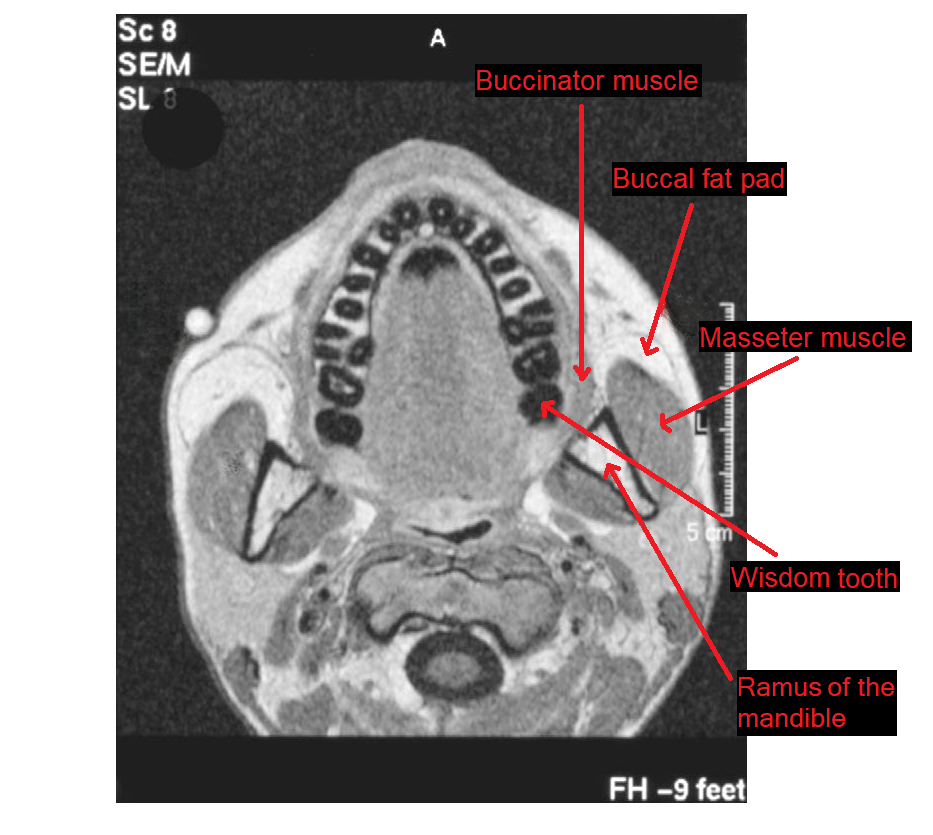
An MRI of head with captions for masseter muscle and other structures around it

== See also ==
- Zygomasseteric system
