= Zygomatic bone =

Facial bone

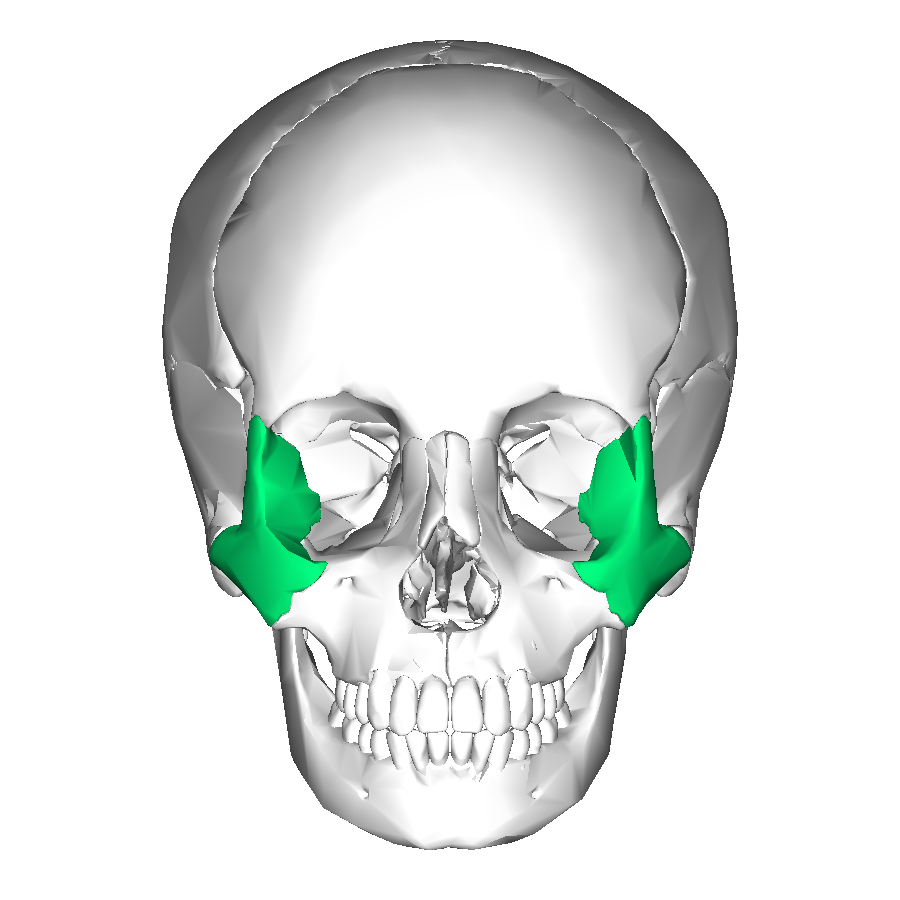
- Position of the zygomatic bone

- Animation of the zygomatic bone

Details
- Part of: Skull
- Articulations: Maxilla, temporal bone, sphenoid bone and frontal bone

Identifiers
- Latin: os zygomaticum, zygoma
- TA98: A02.1.14.001
- TA2: 818
- FMA: 52747

In the human skull, the zygomatic bone (from Ancient Greek: ζῠγόν, romanized: zugón, lit. 'yoke'), also called cheekbone or malar bone, is a paired irregular bone, situated at the upper and lateral part of the face and forming part of the lateral wall and floor of the orbit, of the temporal fossa and the infratemporal fossa. It presents a malar and a temporal surface; four processes (the frontosphenoidal, orbital, maxillary, and temporal), and four borders.

== Etymology ==
The term zygomatic derives from the Ancient Greek Ζυγόμα, zygoma, meaning "yoke". The zygomatic bone is occasionally referred to as the zygoma, but this term may also refer to the zygomatic arch.

== Structure ==
=== Surfaces ===
The malar surface is convex and perforated near its center by a small aperture, the zygomaticofacial foramen, for the passage of the zygomaticofacial nerve and vessels; below this foramen is a slight elevation, which gives origin to the zygomaticus muscle.

The temporal surface, directed posteriorly and medially, is concave, presenting medially a rough, triangular area, for articulation with the maxilla (articular surface), and laterally a smooth, concave surface, the upper part of which forms the anterior boundary of the temporal fossa, the lower a part of the infratemporal fossa. Near the center of this surface is the zygomaticotemporal foramen for the transmission of the zygomaticotemporal nerve.

The orbital surface forms the lateral part and some of the inferior part of the bony orbit. The zygomatic nerve passes through the zygomatic-orbital foramen on this surface. The lateral palpebral ligament attaches to a small protuberance called the orbital tubercle.

=== Processes ===
Each zygomatic bone is diamond-shaped and composed of three processes with similarly named associated bony articulations: frontal, temporal, and maxillary. Each process of the zygomatic bone forms important structures of the skull.

The orbital surface of the frontal process of the zygomatic bone forms the anterior lateral orbital wall, with usually a small paired foramen, the zygomaticofacial foramen opening on its lateral surface. The temporal process of the zygomatic bone forms the zygomatic arch along with the zygomatic process of the temporal bone, with a paired zygomaticotemporal foramen present on the medial deep surface of the bone. The orbital surface of the maxillary process of the zygomatic bone forms a part of the infraorbital rim and a small part of the anterior part of the lateral orbital wall.

=== Orbital process ===
The orbital process is a thick, strong plate, projecting backward and medialward from the orbital margin. Its antero-medial surface forms, by its junction with the orbital surface of the maxilla and with the great wing of the sphenoid, part of the floor and lateral wall of the orbit. On it are seen the orifices of two canals, the zygomatico-orbital foramina; one of these canals opens into the temporal fossa, the other on the malar surface of the bone; the former transmits the zygomaticotemporal, the latter the zygomaticofacial nerve.

- Its postero-lateral surface, smooth and convex, forms parts of the temporal and infratemporal fossae.
- Its anterior margin, smooth and rounded, is part of the circumference of the orbit.
- Its superior margin, rough, and directed horizontally, articulates with the frontal bone behind the zygomatic process.
- Its posterior margin is serrated for articulation, with the great wing of the sphenoid and the orbital surface of the maxilla.

At the angle of junction of the sphenoidal and maxillary portions, a short, concave, non-articular part is generally seen; this forms the anterior boundary of the inferior orbital fissure: occasionally, this non-articular part is absent, the fissure then being completed by the junction of the maxilla and sphenoid, or by the interposition of a small sutural bone in the angular interval between them.

=== Borders ===
The antero-superior or orbital border is smooth, concave, and forms a considerable part of the circumference of the orbit.

The antero-inferior or maxillary border is rough, and bevelled at the expense of its inner table, to articulate with the maxilla; near the orbital margin it gives origin to the quadratus labii superioris.

The postero-superior or temporal border, curved like an italic letter f, is continuous above with the commencement of the temporal line, and below with the upper border of the zygomatic arch; the temporal fascia is attached to it.

The postero-inferior or zygomatic border affords attachment by its rough edge to the masseter.

=== Articulations ===
The zygomatic bone articulates with the frontal bone, sphenoid bone, and paired temporal bones, and maxillary bones.

=== Development ===
The zygomatic bone is generally described as ossifying from three centers—one for the malar and two for the orbital portion; these appear about the eighth week and fuse about the fifth month of fetal life.

Mall describes it as being ossified from one center which appears just beneath and to the lateral side of the orbit.

After birth, the bone is sometimes divided by a horizontal suture into an upper larger, and a lower smaller division.

In some hominins the zygomatic bone consisted of two parts, an orbital and a malar.

== Society and culture ==
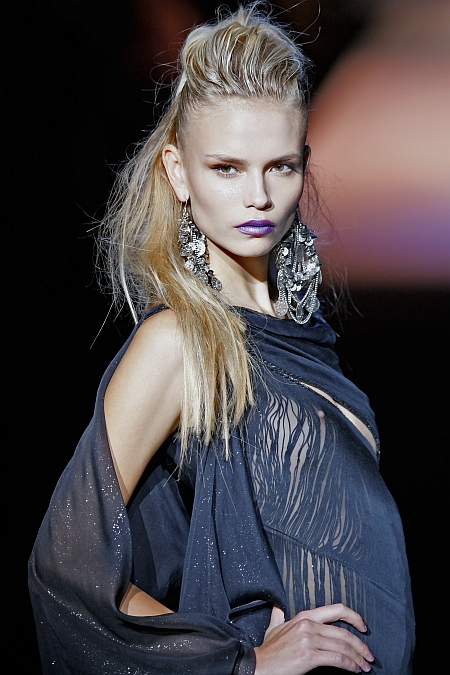
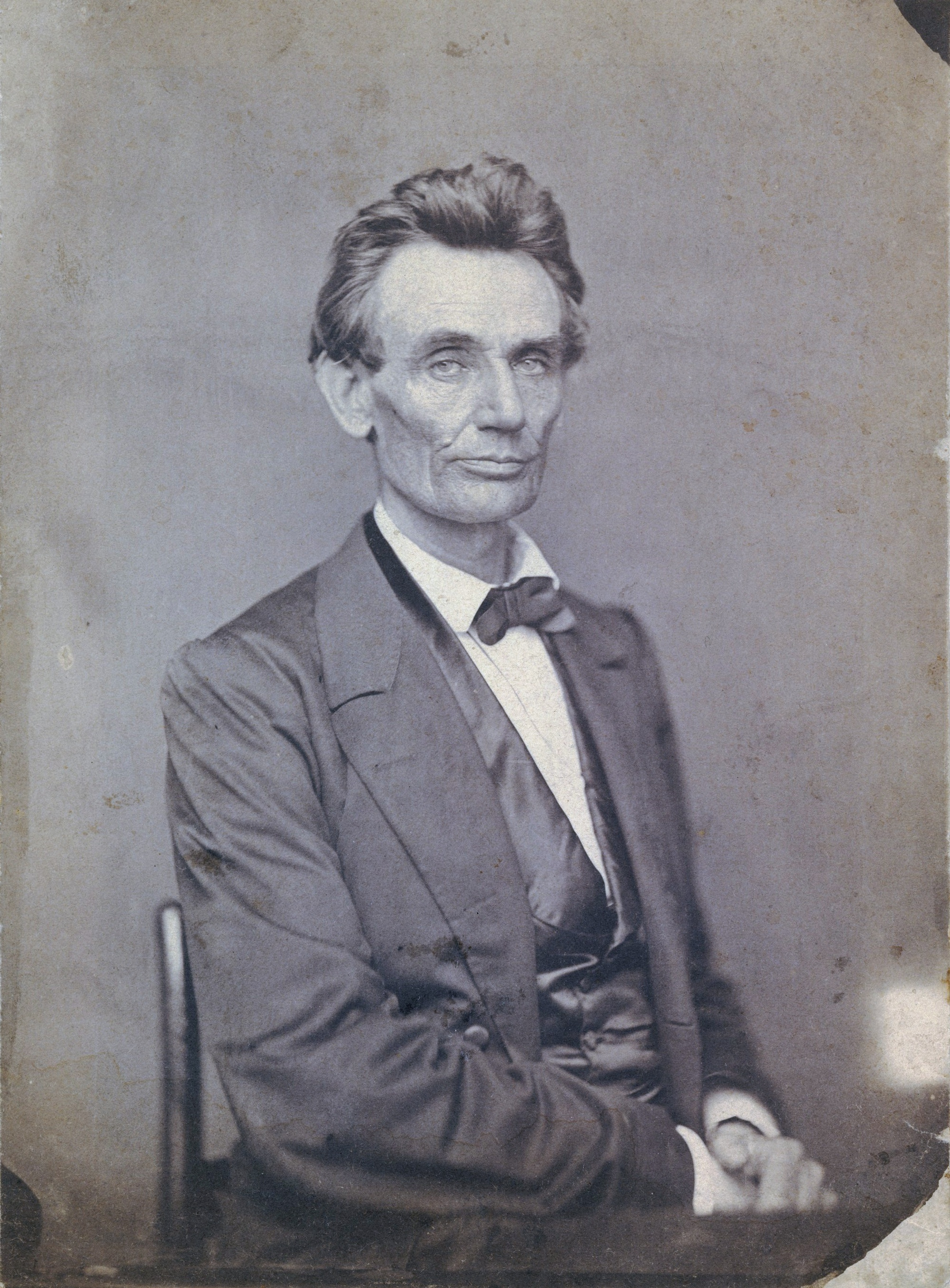
The high cheekbones of model Natasha Poly (left) and Abraham Lincoln (right)

Zygomatic arches, also known as high cheek bones, are considered physically attractive in some cultures, in both males and females.

Ancient Chinese sculptures of goddesses typically have a "broad forehead, raised eyebrows, high cheekbones, and large, sensuous mouth". Similarly, many depictions of Qin warriors in the Terracotta Army are depicted with "broad foreheads, high cheekbones, large eyes, thick eyebrows, and stiff beards."

For this reason some individuals undergo cheek augmentation, a form of cosmetic surgery.

It is also seen in curent culture being a large factor in bp.

== Animals ==
The zygomatic is homologous to the jugal bone of other tetrapods.

=== Non-mammalian vertebrates ===
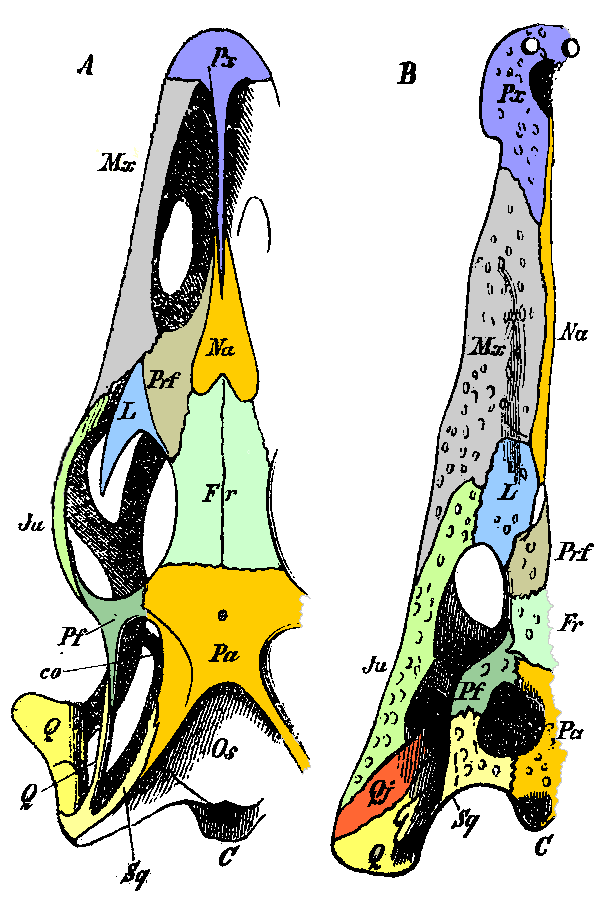
Diagram showing homologous bones of the skulls of a Monitor lizard and a Crocodile. Jugal bone labelled Ju, in pale green, at centre left.

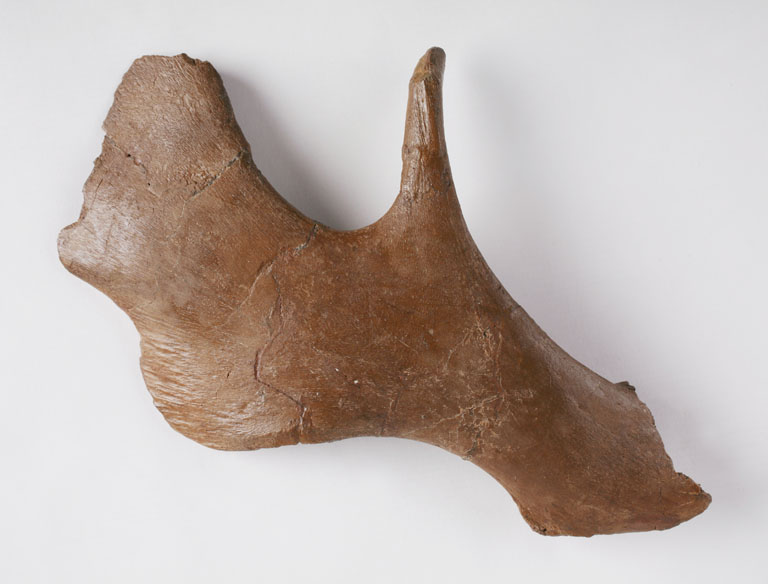
This jugal bone from an Edmontosaurus is over three feet (1 meter) long.

In non-mammalian vertebrates, the zygomatic bone is referred to as the jugal bone, since these animals have no zygomatic arch. It is found in most reptiles, amphibians, and birds. It is connected to the quadratojugal and maxilla, as well as other bones, which may vary by species.

This bone is considered key in the determination of general traits of the skull, as in the case of creatures, such as dinosaurs in paleontology, whose entire skull has not been found. In coelacanths and early tetrapods the bone is relatively large. Here, it is a plate-like bone forming the lower margin of the orbit and much of the side of the face. In ray-finned fishes it is reduced or absent, and the entire cheek region is generally small. The bone is also absent in living amphibians.

With the exception of turtles, the jugal bone in reptiles forms a relatively narrow bar separating the orbit from the inferior temporal fenestra, of which it may also form the lower boundary. The bone is similarly reduced in birds. In mammals, it takes on broadly the form seen in humans, with the bar between the orbit and fenestra vanishing entirely, and only the lower boundary of the fenestra remaining, as the zygomatic arch.

== Additional images ==
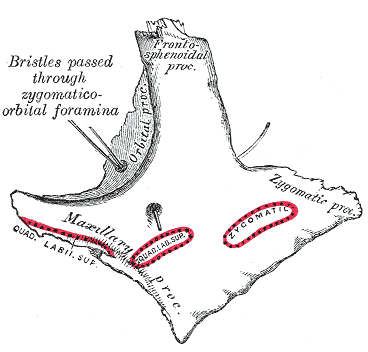
Left zygomatic bone, malar surface

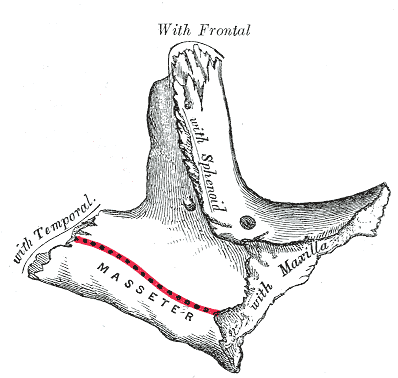
Left zygomatic bone, temporal surface

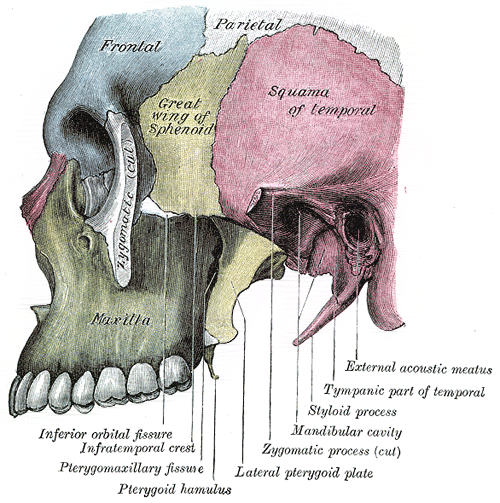
Left infratemporal fossa

== See also ==
- Treacher Collins syndrome
- Zygoma fracture
- Zygomatic arch
- Zygomatic complex fracture
- Zygomatic fossa
