= Alveolus =

General anatomical term for a concave cavity or pit

Alveolus (/ælˈviːələs/ al-VEE-ə-ləs, UK also /ˌælviˈoʊləs/ AL-vee-OH-ləs; pl. alveoli /ælˈviːəlaɪ/ al-VEE-ə-ly, UK also /ˌælviˈoʊlaɪ/ AL-vee-OH-ly; from Latin alveolus 'little cavity') is a general anatomical term for a concave cavity or pit.

== Uses in anatomy and zoology ==
- Pulmonary alveolus, an air sac in the lungs
  - Alveolar cell or pneumocyte
  - Alveolar duct
  - Alveolar macrophage
- Mammary alveolus, a milk sac in the mammary glands
- Alveolar gland
- Dental alveolus, also known as "tooth socket", a socket in the jaw that holds the roots of teeth
  - Alveolar ridge, the jaw structure that contains the dental alveoli
  - Alveolar canals
  - Alveolar process
- Arteries:
  - Superior alveolar artery (disambiguation)
    - Anterior superior alveolar arteries
    - Posterior superior alveolar artery
  - Inferior alveolar artery
- Nerves:
  - Anterior superior alveolar nerve
  - Middle superior alveolar nerve
  - Inferior alveolar nerve

== Uses in botany, microbiology and related disciplines ==
- Surface cavities or pits, such as on the stem of Myrmecodia species
- Pits on honeycombed surfaces such as receptacles of many angiosperms
- Pits on the fruiting bodies of fungi such as Boletus or the ascocarps of fungi such as typical ascomycetes
- Pits on the valves of the tests of many diatoms
- Membrane supporting vesicles of the alveolates

== Uses in linguistics ==
- Alveolar consonant, a linguistic vocalization which involves placing one's tongue against the alveolar ridge
- Alveolar stop

== See also ==
- The dictionary definition of alveolus at Wiktionary
- The dictionary definition of alveolar at Wiktionary
- The dictionary definition of alveoli at Wiktionary
- Alveolar soft part sarcoma, a very rare type of soft-tissue sarcoma,
- Acinus, considered by some (but not all) sources to be synonymous with Alveolus
