= Canalis sinuosus =

Passage in upper jaw bone

The canalis sinuosus is a passage within the maxilla through which the anterior superior alveolar nerve, artery and vein pass. The proximal opening of the canal occurs near the mid-point of the infraorbital canal.

From its proximal opening, the canalis sinuosus first passes inferolaterally within the maxillary orbital floor where it is situated lateral to the infraorbital canal. It then turns to pass inferomedially and anteriorly while passing through the anterior wall of the maxillary sinus (the canal is marked by a groove upon the internal surface of the anterior wall of the sinus). It then courses to the inferior to the infraorbital foramen (of the infraorbital canal) and anterior to the anterior extremity of the inferior nasal concha to reach the margin of the anterior nasal aperture. Thereupon, it passes along the inferior rim of the anterior nasal aperture between the nasal cavity (superiorly), and the tooth sockets (dental alveoli) of the canine and incisor teeth (inferiorly). It ends distally by opening near the nasal septum anterior to the incisive canals. The canal may be up to 55 mm in length.

The anterior superior alveolar nerve turns inferior-ward in the canal and ramifies to innervate the incisor and canine teeth.
