= Dental plexus =

Dental plexus may refer to:

- Inferior dental plexus, a nerve plexus which supplies the lower jaw
- Superior dental plexus, a nerve plexus which supplies the upper jaw
