= Inferior palpebral nerve =

Branch of the infraorbital nerve

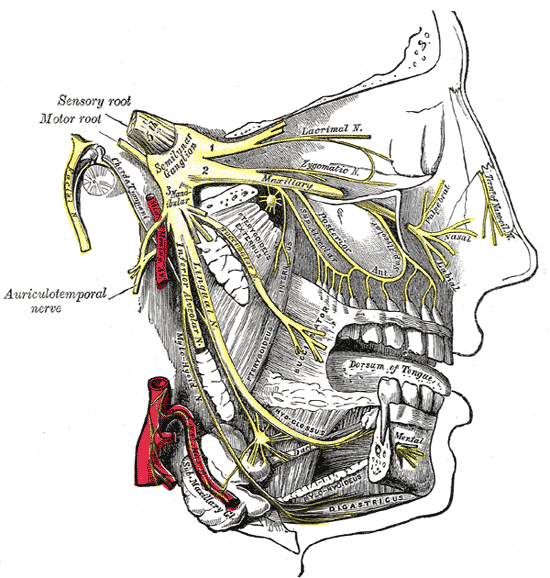
- Distribution of the maxillary and mandibular nerves, and the submaxillary ganglion.

Details
- From: Infraorbital nerve
- Innervates: Skin and conjunctiva of lower eyelid

Identifiers
- Latin: rami palpebrales inferiores nervi infraorbitalis
- TA98: A14.2.01.060
- TA2: 6242
- FMA: 52983

The inferior palpebral nerve (inferior palpebral branches) is a sensory branch of the infraorbital nerve, which arises from the maxillary nerve (CN V2). It makes its way onto the face through the infraorbital foramen and passes toward the lower eyelid. It supplies the skin and conjunctiva of the lower eyelid, joining at the lateral angle of the orbit with the facial and zygomaticofacial nerves. The nerve is relevant in facial anesthesia and in surgical procedures involving the lower eyelid and infraorbital region.
