= Canal (anatomy) =

Type of anatomical structure

In anatomy, a canal (or canalis in Latin) is a tubular passage or channel which connects different regions of the body.

== Examples ==
=== Cranial region ===
- Alveolar canals
- Carotid canal
- Facial canal
- Greater palatine canal
- Incisive canals
- Infraorbital canal
- Mandibular canal
- Optic canal
- Palatovaginal canal
- Pterygoid canal

=== Abdominal region ===
- Inguinal canal

=== Pelvic region ===
- Anal canal
- Cervical canal
- Pudendal canal

=== Upper extremities ===
- Suprascapular canal
- Carpal canal
- Ulnar canal
- Radial canal

=== Lower extremities ===
- Adductor canal
- Femoral canal
- Obturator canal

== See also ==
- Foramen
