= Superior labial nerve =

Branch of the maxillary nerve

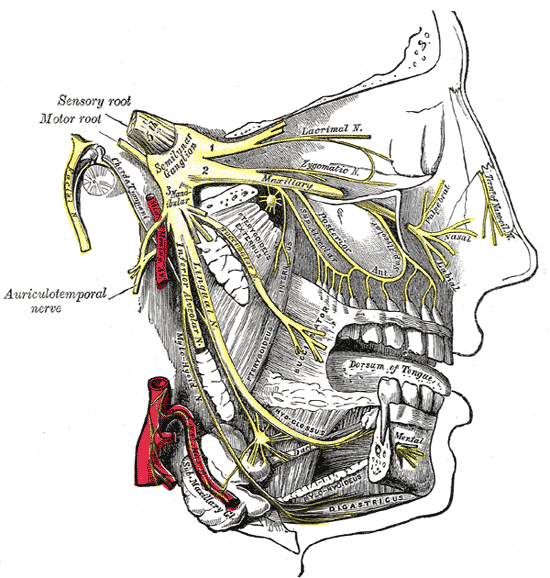
- Distribution of the maxillary and mandibular nerves, and the submaxillary ganglion

Details

Identifiers
- Latin: rami labiales superiores nervi infraorbitalis
- TA98: A14.2.01.063
- TA2: 6245
- FMA: 52986

The superior labial branches (labial branches), the largest and most numerous, descend behind the quadratus labii superioris, and are distributed to the skin of the upper lip, the mucous membrane of the mouth, and labial glands.

They are joined, immediately beneath the orbit, by filaments from the facial nerve, forming with them the infraorbital plexus.

== See also ==
- Superior labial artery
