= Dental anesthesia =

Anesthesia used in dental procedures

- Specialty: Dental anesthesiology
- MeSH: D000766

Dental anesthesia (or dental anaesthesia) is the application of anesthesia to dentistry. It includes local anesthetics, sedation, and general anesthesia.

== Local anesthetic agents in dentistry ==
In dentistry, local anesthetic medications (LA) are often used to control any potential pain that may occur with procedures. Local anesthetic injections are given in specific areas of the mouth, rather than the whole body. Although several different medications are available, the most commonly used local anesthetic to prevent pain in the area around a tooth is lidocaine (also called xylocaine or lignocaine). Lidocaine's half-life in the body is about 1.5–2 hours. The time it takes for the anesthetic medication to prevent pain in the area (speed of onset) and length of time that the area does not have painful sensations are considerations when choosing an appropriate approach to dental treatment. Other considerations include procedural considerations, the presence of inflammation, techniques used to administer the anesthetic medication, and adverse effects. In root canal treatment, for example, more Lidocaine is required than for a simple filling.

Other local anesthetic agents in current use include articaine (also called septocaine or Ubistesin), bupivacaine (a long-acting anesthetic), prilocaine (also called Citanest), and mepivacaine (also called Carbocaine or Polocaine). Different types of local anesthetic drugs vary in their potency and duration of action. A combination of these may be used depending on the situation. Some agents come in two forms: with and without epinephrine (adrenaline) or other vasoconstrictor that allow the agent to last longer. This controls bleeding in the tissue during procedures. Usually the case is classified using the ASA Physical Status Classification System before any anesthesia is given.

Drugs with a short duration of action (approximately 30 minutes of pulpal anesthesia) include Mepivacaine HCl 3%, and Prilocaine HCl 4% without vasoconstrictor.

Drugs with an intermediate duration of action (enabling pulpal anesthesia for roughly 60 minutes) include Articaine HCl 4% + epinephrin 1:100,000, Articaine HCl 4% + epinephrin 1:200,000, Lidocaine HCl 2% + epinephrine 1:50,000, Lidocaine HCl 2% + epinephrine 1:80,000; Lidocaine HCl 2% + epinephrine 1:100,000 and Prilocaine HCl 4% + epinephrine 1:200,000.

Bupivicaine HCl 0.5% + epinephrine 1:200,000 gives a long duration of action of pulpal anesthesia at more than 90 minutes.

Multiple factors affect the depth and duration of local anesthetics' action. Examples of these factors include the patients individual response to the drug, vascularity and pH of tissues at the site of drug administration, the type of injection administered etc. Hence figures citing the duration of action of local anesthetics is an approximation, as extreme variations may occur among patients.

Commercially used LA in dental practice has a low pH of 3–4, this is advantageous as it will extend the shelf life of the product and prevent early oxidation. However, low pH LA's may produce a burning sensation, have a slower onset and decrease clinical efficacy. The pH of a local anesthetic can be increased using sodium bicarbonate which reduces pain at the injection site and produces a faster onset. Buffered local anesthetics have a 2.29 times increased success rate compared with non buffered solutions.

== Maxillary anesthesia ==
Local anesthesia is deposited at the buccal (cheek) side of the maxillary alveolus which can diffuse through the thin cortical plate of the maxilla, then further into the pulp of the tooth in order to achieve dental anesthesia effect.

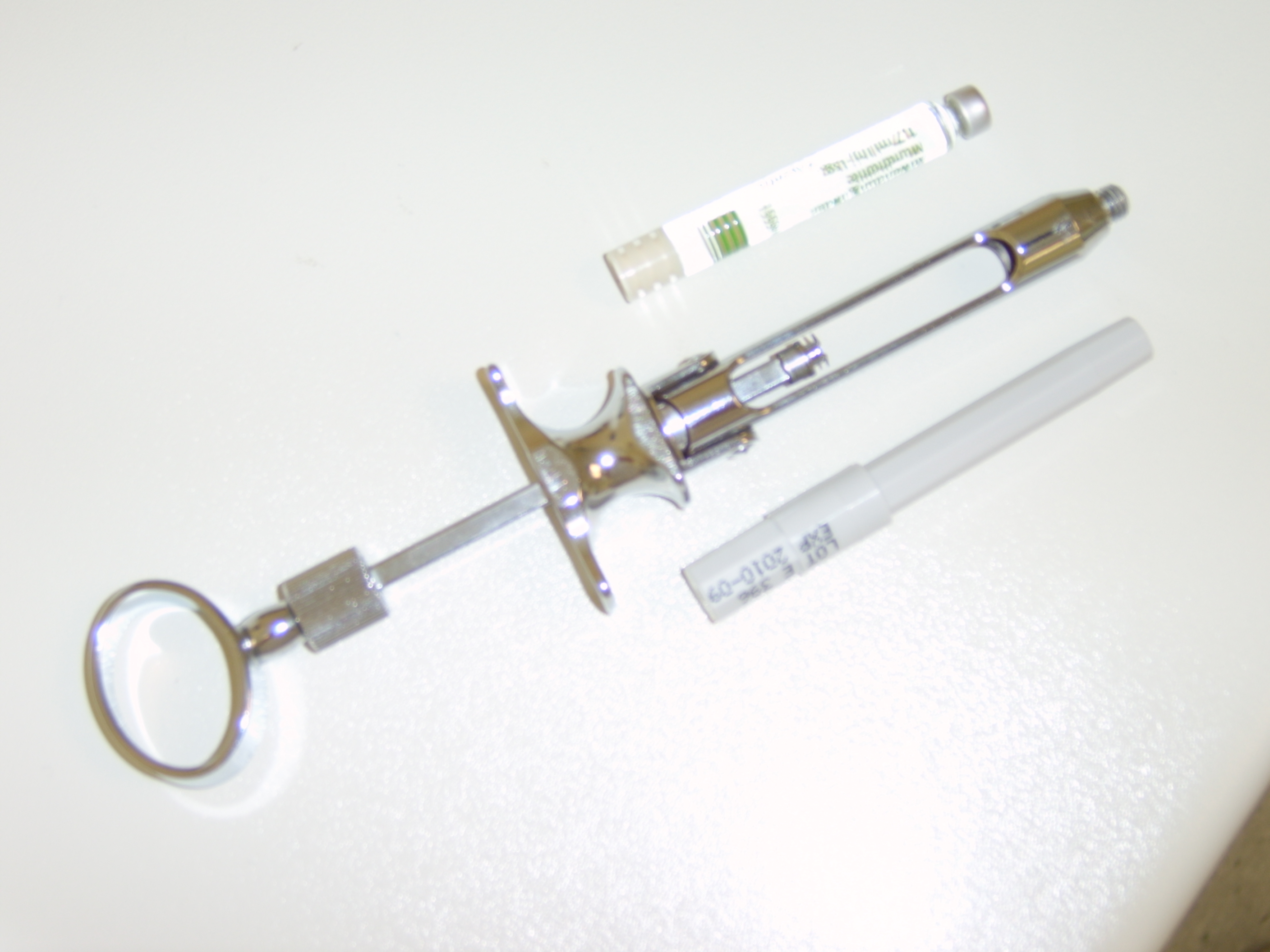

== Mandibular anesthesia ==
Both regional block and infiltration techniques are considered the first choice injections for anaesthetising the mandibular teeth.

Different techniques are chosen based on different factors:

1. Patient age
  - Infiltration anesthesia is a preferable method to anaesthetise deciduous/primary teeth in children. The method is similar to the maxillary buccal infiltration. Ensure the lip/ cheek is stretched in a lateral and inferior direction instead of superiorly and the needle is then penetrated 45' with the buccal cortical plate of the bone through the taut tissue of the muccobuccal fold.
2. Tooth to be anaesthetised
  - Infiltration anesthesia should be the first choice of method for pulpal and soft tissue anesthesia of mandibular permanent incisors in adults. Regional block injections are sometimes ineffective due to crossover innervation from the opposite side of inferior alveolar nerve. It is recommended to deposit at least 0.5mL at each buccal and lingual site in the apical region of the tooth of interest. The use of infiltration anesthesia with 4% articaine with 1:100,000 epinephrine in obtaining pulp anesthesia of the mandibular permanent first molar is getting more common these days due to its successful formulation.

=== Regional block techniques ===
==== Inferior alveolar and lingual block ====
The inferior alveolar nerve block is probably one of the most common methods used by dentist to anaesthetise the mandibular teeth in adults. This technique aims to inject the needle and deposit local anesthetic close to the nerve before it enters the mandibular foramen, which locates on the medial aspect of the mandibular ramus. This is to block the nerve transmission in the inferior alveolar nerve before entering into the bone through the mandibular foramen.

==== Long buccal nerve block ====
Results of a systematic review with meta-analysis, showed that the anesthetic efficacy of 4% articaine buccal infiltration is comparable to 2% lidocaine inferior alveolar nerve block for mandibular first molars with symptomatic irreversible pulpitis.

== Supplementary techniques ==
=== Intraosseous ===
Intraosseous anesthesia is an alternative anesthetic injection technique that was first published in 1910. Intraosseous anesthetic injection involves the deposition of anesthetic solution directly into the cancellous alveolar bone adjacent to the apex of the root of the tooth to be anaesthetised through a small hole. Additionally, more complex dental procedures like surgery or endodontic therapy (like root canals) might make use of it.

=== Intraligamentary ===
Intraligamentary or periodontal ligament anesthesia is a technique used primarily for endodontic treatment and to supplement inferior dental blocks where they may have failed. This technique involves 'the deposition of at least 0.2ml of local anesthetic solution for each root of the tooth' diffusing into the marrow spaces surrounding the teeth. Clinicians may adopt this technique due to some benefits such as: no soft tissue anesthesia, use of a smaller amount of anesthetic and single tooth anesthesia however use may be contraindicated due to claims that patients report sharp pain upon administration of interligamentary aesthetic. However the use of a high-pressure syringe and ultra fine needle provide both chemical anesthesia (by action of anesthetic agent) and mechanical anesthesia (by pressure from deposition). Interligamentary anesthetic may be complicated by poor operator technique where rapid injection and excessive volume is used; this could lead to sensitivity to biting and percussion.

Research has shown that the rate of onset of anesthesia in the patients was between 15 and 20 second; this provides an advantage compared to that of inferior alveolar dental block. Other advantages include a decrease in overall trauma in comparison to conventional blocks therefore being an ideal procedure for extractions and endodontic treatment in children.

=== Intrapulpal ===
Intrapulpal anesthesia involves the direct placement of anesthetic agent using a small needle (of 25 or 27 gauge) into the pulp chamber; it is injected under pressure leading to brief yet intense discomfort. This particular technique provides effective pulpal anesthesia as the pulpal tissue is subject to chemical action by the anesthetic agent and mechanical stimulus due to the pressure applied. This method is usually adopted when all other techniques have been unsuccessful and must include pre-operative warnings of sharp pain. However it may prove useful for pulpal extirpation or endodontic treatment on any tooth where anesthesia is difficult to achieve. Nevertheless, due to the patient discomfort associated with this technique it should not be the primary anesthetic technique used.

=== Intra-papillary ===
Intra-papillary anesthesia is used as a supplementary technique to infiltrations in order to increase comfort for the patient and is primarily used to replace palatal or lingual infiltrations. This is exceptionally successful in paediatric patients and works to replace or increase comfort for particularly uncomfortable infiltrations such as palatal or lingual infiltrations. The technique involves direct deposition of anesthetic agent into the papilla with associated tissue blanching at site of injection. The point of penetration should lie in attached gingiva 2mm apical of the papilla

=== Pressure anesthesia ===
Pressure with a cotton swab in the area to distract the nerve sensation of pain when the needle enters certain areas such as palatal tissue.

=== Electrical nerve blocks ===
Technology that involves using electric current to block the reception or generation of pain signals; the pain control can be transient.

== Jet injection ==
A jet injection aims to create a release of pressure strong enough to push a liquid medication dose through a small orifice. This is usually done with the help of an energy source which is mechanical. With this, a thin column of fluid is created which has the force to penetrate soft tissues, thus a needle is not required.

Advantages:

- Faster drug absorption at injection site
- Easy to use
- Little/no pain
- Less tissue damage

However, in dentistry, the effectiveness of this technique has been reported to be limited.

Examples of jet injections include: Syrijet, MED-JET H III and iCT injection SE by Dentium.

== Dosage ==
Drug name	UK Trade name	Concentration (%)	Maximum dose (mg/kg)
Articaine with adrenaline	Bartinest Septanest	4	7
Bupivacaine	Marcain	0.25	2.5
Lidocaine		1	3
Lidocaine		2	3
Lidocaine with adrenaline	Utilycaine Lignospan Special Xylocaine	1	7
Lidocaine with adrenaline	Utilycaine Lignospan Special Xylocaine	2	7
Mepivacaine	Scandonest	2	1.36 (3 mg per pound), less than 400 mg in adults
Mepivacaine	Scandonest	3	1.36 (3 mg per pound), less than 400 mg in adults
Prilocaine with Felypressin	Citanest	0.5	7
Prilocaine with Felypressin	Citanest	1	7
Prilocaine Plain	Citanest Plain	1	6

== Contraindications ==
When considering the use of a local anesthesia there are many factors which should be considered. In terms of contraindications associated with LA there are "absolute" and "relative" contraindications. When something is said to have an "absolute" contraindication this underlines that under no circumstance would that LA be selected to administer to that specific patient as it poses a potential life-threatening risk e.g. allergy. When the LA has a "relative" contraindication the administration of the LA is not preferable and should be avoided, but does not pose a life-threatening risk.

=== Type ===
As stated previously, local anesthesia used in dentistry can vary significantly as there are various preparations with a multitude of qualities. Each preparation has slight differences in how the anesthetic affects the body due to the use of different constituents. Local anesthetics which contain adrenaline such as Lidocaine (using 1:80,000 of adrenaline) or Articaine (using 1:100,000 of adrenaline) have a direct effect on the cardiac output by increasing the rate and contraction of the heart itself. Due to these effects, if a patient has unstable angina or severe cardiac dysrhythmia, these preparations are often discouraged as they may predispose to unfavourable side effects. Studies found that both articaine given by infiltration and lidocaine given by inferior block were equally efficient when used for routine dental treatments in pediatric patients, however, articaine injections caused less post-operative pain.

As an alternative, other preparations such as Mepivacaine Hydrochloride or Prilocaine (containing Felypressin) can be used. Prilocaine is especially suitable for a patient who wishes to avoid adrenaline or may have a latex/preservative allergy. The main contraindication of Prilocaine is that it has a short half-life and it possesses a mild cytotoxic effect, therefore should be avoided in pregnancy. This cytotoxic effect can influence the uterine tone and interfere with circulation, which can pose detrimental effects on the pregnancy. Mepivacaine Hydrochloride is then considered if Prilocaine is contraindicated. Mepivacaine is the least vasodilatory anesthetic as it has no vasoconstrictors and no preservatives added.

=== In relation to the dose ===
The dose of local anesthesia is often reduced when a patient has any systemic health implications or habits which may cause an interference. From time to time the local anesthetic itself should be reduced (therefore reducing the maximum dose). This is particularly done when alcoholism, anaemia (if using Prilocaine), anorexia, bradycardia, or GORD (Gastroesophageal reflux disease) is concerned. On other occasions the vasoconstrictor used (often adrenaline) must be reduced when an individual has angina, bradycardia, chronic bronchitis, cardiac arrhythmia, COPD (Chronic Obstructive Pulmonary Disease), or glaucoma. Other issues include drug abuse, calcium channel blocker containing medications, beta blocker medications, or liver disease as these impair metabolism of the anesthetic.

=== In relation to the technique ===
The variety of techniques associated when giving a local anesthetic can affect the success and, if done incorrectly, lead to a possible fracture of the needle tip. It is extremely rare for the needle to fracture whilst giving an injection intra-orally unless an inadequate technique is adopted. To prevent such an occurrence, especially when performing an inferior alveolar nerve block, it is recommended to not bend the needle, to use the correct needle length and to not insert the needle up to the hub.

== Most common local anesthetic procedure ==
The Inferior alveolar nerve anesthesia or block or IANB (sometimes termed "inferior dental block", or wrongly referred to as the "mandibular block") probably is anesthetized more often than any other nerve in the body. An injection blocks sensation in the inferior alveolar nerve, which runs from the angle of the mandible down the medial aspect of the mandible, innervating the mandibular teeth, lower lip, chin, and parts of the tongue, which is effective for dental work in the mandibular arch. To anesthetize this nerve, the needle is inserted somewhat posterior to the most distal mandibular molar on one side of the mouth. The lingual nerve is also anesthetized through diffusion of the agent to produce a numb tongue as well as anesthetizing the floor of the mouth tissue, including that around the tongue side or lingual of the teeth.

Several nondental nerves are usually anesthetized during an inferior alveolar block. The mental nerve, which supplies cutaneous innervation to the anterior lip and chin, is a distal branch of the inferior alveolar nerve. When the inferior alveolar nerve is blocked, the mental nerve is blocked also, resulting in a numb lip and chin. Nerves lying near the point where the inferior alveolar nerve enters the mandible often are also anesthetized during inferior alveolar anesthesia, such as affecting hearing (auriculotemporal nerve).

The facial nerve lies some distance from the inferior alveolar nerve within the parotid salivary gland, but in rare cases anesthetic can be injected far enough posteriorly to anesthetize that nerve. The result is a transient facial paralysis, with the injected side of the face having temporary loss of the use of the muscles of facial expression that include the inability to close the eyelid and the drooping of the labial commissure on the affected side for a few hours, which disappears when the anesthesia wears off.

In contrast, the superior alveolar nerves are not usually anesthetized directly because they are difficult to approach with a needle. For this reason, the maxillary arch is usually anesthetized locally for dental work by inserting the needle beneath the oral mucosa surrounding the teeth so as to anesthetize the smaller branches.

=== Dental syringe ===
A dental syringe is a syringe for the injection of a local anesthetic. It consists of a breech-loading syringe fitted with a sealed cartridge containing an anesthetic solution.

In 1928, Bayer Dental developed, coined and produced a sealed cartridge system under the registered trademark Carpule^{®}. The current trademark owner is Kulzer Dental GmbH.

The carpules have long been reserved for anesthetic products for dental use. It is practically a bottomless flask. The latter is replaced by an elastomer plug that can slide in the body of the cartridge. This plug will be pushed by the plunger of the syringe. The neck is closed with a rubber cap. The dentist places the cartridge directly into a stainless steel syringe, with a double-pointed (single-use) needle. The tip placed on the cartridge side punctures the capsule and the piston will push the product. There is therefore no contact between the product and the ambient air during use.

In the UK and Ireland, manually operated hand syringes are used to inject lidocaine in to a patient's gums.

== Other anesthetics used in dentistry ==
- Topical anesthetics such as benzocaine, eugenol, and forms of xylocaine are used topically to numb various areas before injections or other minor procedures. Topical anesthetics in dentistry act on the peripheral nerves on mucosal surfaces to reduce sensation. Topical anesthetics will contain either lidocaine or benzocaine as their active ingredient and come in a variety of forms, including solutions, creams, gels, and sprays. Anesthesia can also be used to reduce dental phobia, especially in children, by reducing discomfort and pain. Indications for topical anesthesia in dentistry include:
  - Needle insertion for infiltration anesthesia
  - Root planning or scaling
  - Dry socket
  - Rubber dam placement
  - Gingival retraction cord placement
  - Matrix or wedge placement
  - Reduction of pain in a wounded area
- Nitrous oxide (N_{2}O), also known as "laughing gas", easily crosses the alveoli of the lung and is dissolved into the passing blood, where it travels to the brain, leaving a dissociated and euphoric feeling in most cases. Nitrous oxide is used in combination with oxygen. Often (especially with children) a sweet-smelling scent, similar to vanilla or fruit, is used with the gas to encourage deep inhalation.
- General anesthesia drugs such as midazolam, ketamine, propofol and fentanyl are used to put a person in a twilight state or render them completely unconscious and unaware of pain. In the US, dentists who have completed a training program in anesthesiology may also administer general IV and inhalation anesthetic agents.
- Midazolam (Versed), a drug that represses memories of the procedure, is usually given two hours prior to the procedure in combination with Tylenol in general anesthesia so the person will go home with no memories of being in surgery.
- Sevoflurane gas in combination with nitrous oxide and oxygen is often used during general anesthesia followed by the use of isoflurane gas to maintain anesthesia during the procedure. For children, sweet or fruity scents are often used with the gases to inspire deep inhalation.
- Propofol, a drug with similar effects to Sodium Pentathol, is often used through intravenous infusion through an IV during general anesthesia after gasses are initiated. Propofol-remifentanil intravenous sedation has been shown to be effective at reducing the severity of gag reflex disorders during treatment.
- Morphine is often used to control pain during dental surgery under general anesthesia. The morphine is usually administered through IV and has analgesic effects.
- Ketorolac is an analgesic often administered through IV to suppress pain and inflammation under general anesthetic during the procedure. It is also used to control postoperative pain especially after endodontic treatment.

== Drugs used in combination with general anesthesia ==
- Decadron a steroid is often administered through IV to suppress inflammation and swelling resulting during the surgery while under general anesthesia.
- Ondansetron brand named Zofran is often administered to prevent nausea during surgery which may result from blood draining into the stomach while under general anesthesia, or it is given afterwards for nausea which may result from the anesthesia.

== Local anesthesia and the pregnant patient ==
Provided a dentist performs proper aspiration to avoid intravenous injections, local anesthetics containing epinephrine (adrenaline) are safe to use during pregnancy. lignocaine and prilocaine are assigned a category B ranking by the FDA and are therefore safe for use during pregnancy. Lignocaine and prilocaine are sold as 2% and 4% formulations, respectively. It is therefore safer to use the lignocaine so as to administer a lower concentration of the drug to the pregnant patient.

Mepivicaine, articaine, bupivicaine are given an FDA category C ranking and so should be avoided. Benzocaine, the ingredient of most topical anesthetic formulations, is also ranked as category C and should be avoided. Lignocaine should be used as topical anesthetic instead.

Epinephrine in high doses is harmful to a pregnant woman in that it affects uterine blood flow. However its use in low dose with local anesthetic administration is warranted. The epinephrine causes vasoconstriction which in turn reduces systemic distribution of the anesthetic as well as prolongs its action in addition to decreasing bleeding at the operating site. Lidocaine 2% with 1:100,000 adrenaline is the local anesthetic of choice in the treatment of pregnant women.

== Allergy to local anesthetic ==
Allergic reactions from local anesthesia have been reported in some patients. However, this occurrence is rare even in patients who had a history of adverse reactions to LA.

There are mainly 2 classes of local anesthetic agents: Amide or Ester linkages, based on their chemical structure.

- E.g. of amide LA: lidocaine, prilocaine, articaine, mepivacaine
- E.g. of ester LA: benzocaine, procaine

Genuine allergic reactions of an amide LA is very uncommon. An ester LA is more possible to result in an allergic reaction because the compound will be broken down to para-aminobenzoic acid (PABA) which is a trigger for allergic reactions. In general dentistry, only topical applications of LA contains esters (benzocaine) when applied onto area before LA is administered.

If one is allergic to an ester LA, then the use of other types of ester LA should be avoided as the breakdown of all esters will produce PABA. However, patients allergic to ester LA will usually not be affected by amide LA because PABA is not produced upon breakdown of amide LA. Unlike ester LA, allergy to an amide LA will not eliminate the use of other types of amide LA.

Some reactions are caused by administration of too much drug, usually because of the route of entry of drug (intravenously) or the quick uptake of drug into the system, or the aftereffect of the vasoconstrictor. Unfavourable reactions to LA can be classified into 3 different groups: psychogenic, allergic, toxic.

=== Differential diagnosis & management ===
- Psychogenic reactions

Unfavourable reactions to LA are commonly due to a hyperemotional response to a perceived danger within someone's mind, and it could be demonstrated in several ways. Examples are temporal loss of consciousness, sweating, flush, change in heart rate or blood pressure, panic attack, hyperventilation, of which may be mistaken as allergic reactions. When treating such patients, treat them with care and take into consideration their anxiety. During treatment if the patients feel faint or experiences a drop in blood pressure, lay them flat and keep their legs elevated in an attempt to restore their blood pressure. Loosen any tight clothing and keep the patients sugary food/drink after they regain consciousness. Reassure the patient.

It is important to ensure that children and adolescents experience less anxiety and fear to aid acceptance of future dental treatment. A study compared different methods to increase the acceptance of delivery of local anesthetics to patients aged between 2–16 years old. These methods included the use of; audiovisual distraction (using 3D video glasses), a "wand" (computerised injection device), practising hypnosis, electrical counter-stimulation (a form of distraction) and video modelling. However, the evidence was insufficient to support their use.

- Toxic reactions

This may occur when there are large amounts of anesthetic within their vascular system, which may owe to their receiving repeated LA, intravenous entry of drug or have underlying systemic conditions that do not metabolize or utilize the drug efficiently. Signs and symptoms mainly involve the nervous system e.g. aggressive behaviour, drowsiness, speech alteration, disorientation etc.

Symptoms should usually resolve in a few hours, up to 12 hours, as the body will gradually rid the bloodstream of the drug. Assure the patient that their symptoms will improve after a few hours and that such a reaction should not recur and that there is no need to abstain from that drug hereafter.

Such reactions can be minimized via practising safe injection methods using an aspirating syringe to prevent injecting in blood vessels, slow administration of drug, and avoid overprescribing LA, keeping in mind the patient's weight, age and medical history.

=== Signs & symptoms of allergic reactions to LA ===
Genuine allergy to LA will manifest either as Type 1 or Type 4 hypersensitivity. Signs and symptoms will vary depending on the type of allergy. Type 1 reactions have a rapid onset of symptoms which include swelling, redness, rashes, itchiness, chest tightness, breathing problems. A Type 4 reaction has a delayed onset of symptoms and is usually localized to the site of injection.

=== Management ===
If a genuine allergic reaction to LA should occur, the patient should be treated as an emergency for anaphylaxis, according to the guidelines in the respective areas. For the UK, the section on medical emergencies in dental practice in the "Prescribing in Dental Practice" part in the BNF should be referred to. The patient should be sent immediately to the hospital if their condition worsens.

The individual should undergo further tests to certify their allergy to the LA or for other possible causes of the adverse reaction.

== Gate control theory in painless anesthesia ==
The gate control theory explains that pain can be reduced if the touch nerve fibres are stimulated due to non-harmful stimuli.

Advancements in techniques used to deliver local anesthesia are very important. There are types of local anesthesia that apply vibrations to the skin while the injection is being placed into the skin. This uses the gate control theory to minimise pain to the patient. The high frequency vibrations coming from the device which is attached to the syringe inhibit the pain sensations coming from the needle insertion. The nerve fibres that are stimulated are the Aβ fibres which respond to pressure or vibration. Meissner's corpuscles, located in deeper tissues and bone are also affected. This closes a 'neural gate' which decreases the patient's feeling of pain.

Methods used by dentist to reduce pain during anesthesia by using the gate control theory are: Warming of the local anesthetic cartridge, Stretching the oral mucosa, Gentle rubbing of the extra-oral skin.

== Potential side effects ==
=== Myotoxicity ===
Although complications of myotoxicity in dental anesthesia are rare, myotoxic injuries are primarily mediated by disturbances in calcium homeostasis. The onset of a myotoxic episode can occur within a few hours to a few days after local anesthetic (LA) administration. A greater concentration and longer exposure to LA have been found to have a positive correlation with myotoxic effects. It can take human muscles from 4 days to a year to recover from a myotoxic insult. Local anesthetics used clinically can be ranked in increasing order of their risk of myotoxicity, this includes Lidocaine, Ropivacaine and Bupivacaine.

=== Ocular complications ===
Dental anesthesia can present with many complications such as occlusal complications. There are many forms of dental anesthesia that can cause these issues for example an Inferior Dental Block (IDB). Most commonly, ocular complications will present on the same side of the face where the injection was given. Symptoms include double vision followed by partial or full weakness in the eye muscle. Many pathophysiological processes have been discussed as a cause of these complications, including intra-arterial injection and autonomic dysregulation. Furthermore, following an incident, the patient should be reassured, and the eye should be covered with gauze to protect the eye until the corneal (blinking) reflex has returned. These symptoms usually resolve on their own but in the occurrence of persistence or deterioration, appropriate referral to an ophthalmologist should be made.

Issues can also arise with use of nitrous oxide in patients who have had pneumatic retinopexy (alone or in conjunction with a vitrectomy), commonly used to treat retinal detachments. In these procedures, a gas is injected into the vitreous cavity as a tamponade and to promote re-adhesion of the detached retina. The gas bubble causes diffusion of nitrogen out of the bloodstream and into the bubble causing it to expand. Nitrous oxide is 34 times more soluble than nitrogen and will cause an extreme expansion, raising the intraocular pressure to dangerous levels. Such high intraocular pressures cause ischemia of the central retinal artery, leading to irreversible vision loss.

== See also ==
- Dental surgery
