= Infraorbital plexus =

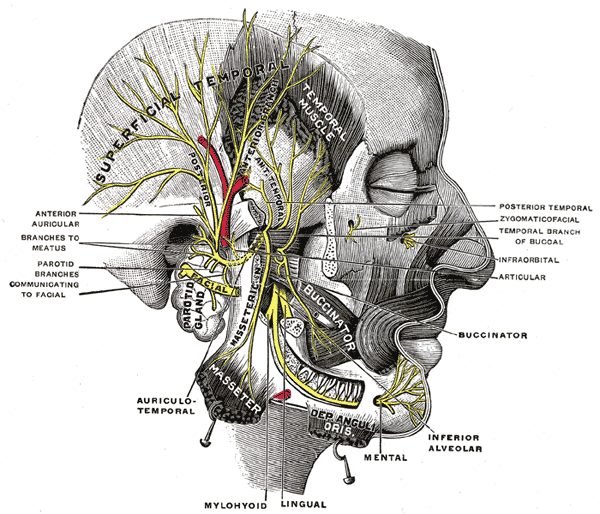
- Mandibular division of the trifacial nerve. (Infraorbital labeled at center right.)

Details
- From: Facial nerve, superior labial nerve

The superior labial branches descend behind the quadratus labii superioris, and are distributed to the skin of the upper lip, the mucous membrane of the mouth, and labial glands. They are joined, immediately beneath the orbit, by filaments from the facial nerve, forming with them the infraorbital plexus.
