= Middle superior alveolar nerve =

Branch of the infraorbital nerve

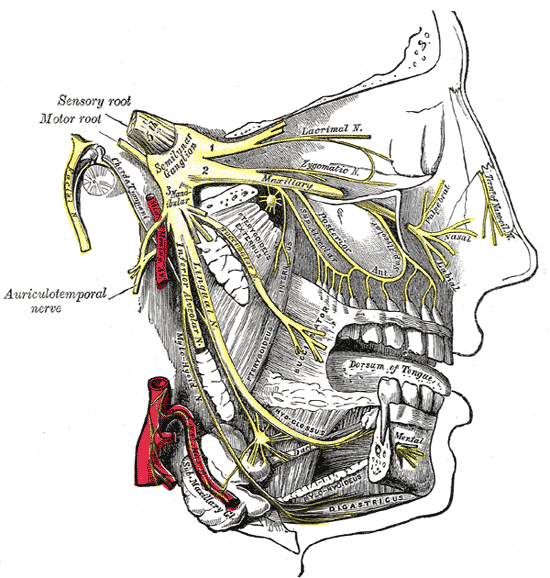
- Distribution of the maxillary and mandibular nerves, and the submaxillary ganglion.

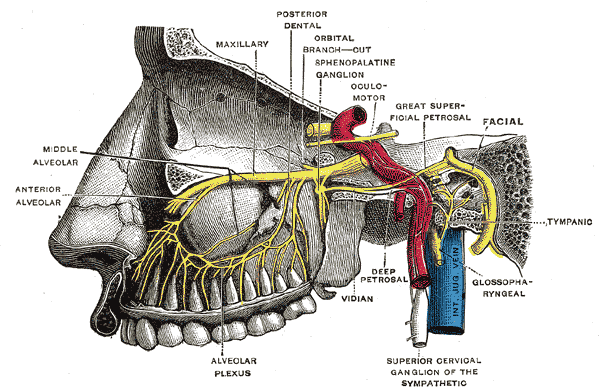
- Alveolar branches of superior maxillary nerve and sphenopalatine ganglion.

Details
- From: Infraorbital nerve
- To: Superior dental plexus
- Innervates: Maxillary premolar teeth, gingiva, mesiobuccal root of first molar

Identifiers
- Latin: ramus alveolaris superior medius nervi maxillaris
- TA98: A14.2.01.051
- TA2: 6240
- FMA: 52932

The middle superior alveolar nerve or middle superior dental nerve is a sensory branch of the infraorbital nerve, which is a branch of the maxillary nerve (CN V2). It typically arises within the infraorbital canal of the maxilla and descends along the lateral wall of the maxillary sinus. The nerve contributes to the superior dental plexus and supplies the sinus mucosa, the roots of the maxillary premolars, and the mesiobuccal root of the first maxillary molar. It is not always present; in 72% of cases it is non existent with the anterior superior alveolar nerve innervating the premolars and the posterior superior alveolar nerve innervating the molars, including the mesiobuccal root of the first molar. It is clinically relevant in dental anesthesia and in procedures involving the maxillary premolar region and maxillary sinus.

== See also ==
- Alveolar nerve (Dental nerve)

- Superior alveolar nerve (Superior dental nerve)

- Anterior superior alveolar nerve (Anterior superior dental nerve)
- Posterior superior alveolar nerve (Posterior superior dental nerve)

- Inferior alveolar nerve (Inferior dental nerve)
