= Maxillary sinus =

Largest of the paranasal sinuses, and drains into the middle meatus of the nose

- Outline of bones of face, showing position of air sinuses. Maxillary sinus is shown in blue.

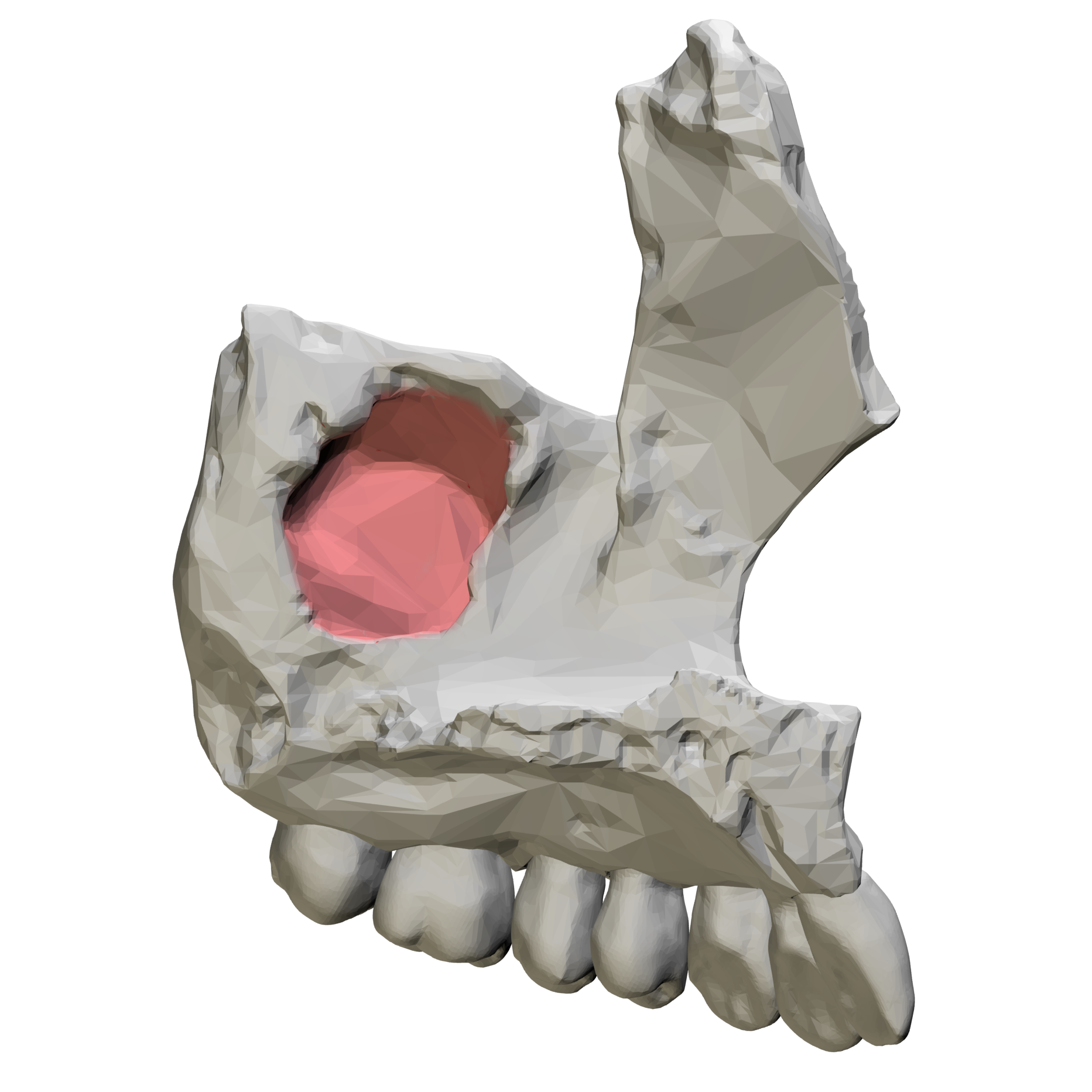
- Left maxilla, medial view. Maxillary sinus entry shown in red.

Details
- Artery: Infraorbital artery, posterior superior alveolar artery
- Nerve: Posterior superior alveolar nerve, middle superior alveolar nerve, anterior superior alveolar nerve, and infraorbital nerve

Identifiers
- Latin: sinus maxilliaris
- MeSH: D008443
- TA98: A02.1.12.023
- TA2: 780
- FMA: 57715

The pyramid-shaped maxillary sinus (or antrum of Highmore) is the largest of the paranasal sinuses, located in the maxilla. It drains into the middle meatus of the nose through the semilunar hiatus. It is located to the side of the nasal cavity, and below the orbit.

== Structure ==
It is the largest air sinus in the body. It has a mean volume of about 10 ml. It is situated within the body of the maxilla, but may extend into its zygomatic and alveolar processes when large. It is pyramid-shaped, with the apex at the maxillary zygomatic process, and the base represented by the lateral nasal wall.

It has three recesses: an alveolar recess pointed inferiorly, bounded by the alveolar process of the maxilla; a zygomatic recess pointed laterally, bounded by the zygomatic bone; and an infraorbital recess pointed superiorly, bounded by the inferior orbital surface of the maxilla. The medial wall is composed primarily of cartilage.

=== Walls ===
The nasal wall of the maxillary sinus, or base, presents, in the disarticulated bone, a large, irregular aperture that communicates with the nasal cavity. In the articulated skull this aperture is much reduced in size by the following bones:

- the uncinate process of the ethmoid above,
- the ethmoidal process of the inferior nasal concha below,
- the vertical part of the palatine behind,
- and a small part of the lacrimal above and in front.

The sinus communicates through an opening into the semilunar hiatus on the lateral nasal wall.

The medial wall is composed primarily of cartilage.

On the posterior wall are the alveolar canals, transmitting the posterior superior alveolar vessels and nerves to the molar teeth.

The floor is formed by the alveolar process, and, if the sinus is of an average size, is on a level with the floor of the nose; if the sinus is large it reaches below this level. Projecting into the floor of the antrum are several conical processes, corresponding to the roots of the first and second maxillary molar teeth; in some cases the floor can be perforated by the apices of the teeth.

The roof is formed by the floor of the orbit. It is traversed by infraorbital nerves and vessels.

=== Features ===
The infraorbital canal forms a ridge at the junction of the roof and anterior wall of the sinus; additional ridges are sometimes seen in the posterior wall of the cavity and are caused by the alveolar canals.

=== Innervation ===
The mucous membranes receive their mucomotor postganglionic parasympathetic nerve fibres from the pterygopalatine ganglion.

The superior alveolar (anterior, middle, and posterior) nerves, branches of the maxillary nerve provide sensory innervation.

=== Microanatomy ===
The sinus is lined with mucoperiosteum, with cilia that beat toward the ostia. This membranous lining is also referred to as the Schneiderian membrane, which is histologically a bilaminar membrane with pseudostratified ciliated columnar epithelial cells on the internal (or cavernous) side and periosteum on the osseous side. The size of the sinuses varies in different skulls, and even on the two sides of the same skull.

=== Relations ===
The roof of the sinus is also the floor of the orbit. Posterior to the sinus and its wall are the pterygopalatine fossa and the infratemporal fossa.

=== Variation ===
After puberty, the maxillary sinus rapidly increases in size. Its size is variable in the adult; if large, it may extend into the zygomatic process and alveolar process of the maxilla.

Extension into the maxillary alveolar process may cause the roots of the molars and even premolars to lie just beneath the floor of the sinus or even project through the floor and into the sinus; in such cases, the roots of the teeth are typically surrounded by a thin layer of bone, but may sometimes lie directly underneath the mucous membrane of the sinus. Projection of the roots into the maxillary sinus is more common in advanced age due to bone resorption. In such cases, tooth extraction can create a fistula between the oral cavity and the sinus that nevertheless usually resolves spontaneously.

An accessory maxillary ostium (found in 0% to 42% of the population) is an additional natural opening in the lateral nasal wall that provides communication between the maxillary sinus and the nasal cavity, apart from the primary or natural maxillary ostium. It is usually located in the posterior fontanelle of the lateral nasal wall, part of the middle meatus. While this ostium is listed as an anatomical variation, it has a role in the development of maxillary sinusitis.

=== Development ===
Maxillary sinus is the first paranasal sinuses to form. At birth, it is about 6 to 8 cm^{3} in volume, elongated, as is orientated in antero-posterior direction, located at the next to the medial orbital wall of the eye. The lateral wall of the maxillary sinus goes beneath the medial orbital wall during the first year of life, extends laterally pass the infraorbital groove by the age of four years, and reach the maxilla by the age of nine years. After the first permanent tooth erupted at the age of six to seven, aeration of maxillary sinus is the main growth feature. At the final phase of aeration, the floor of maxillary sinus is four to five millimetres below the floor of nasal cavity. However, timing of maxillary sinus growth is variable in different people.

The maxillary sinus can normally be seen above the level of the premolar and molar teeth in the upper jaw. This dental x-ray film shows how, in the absence of the second premolar and first molar, the sinus became pneumatized and expanded towards the crest of the alveolar process (location at which the bone meets the gum tissue).

== Clinical significance ==
=== Maxillary sinusitis ===
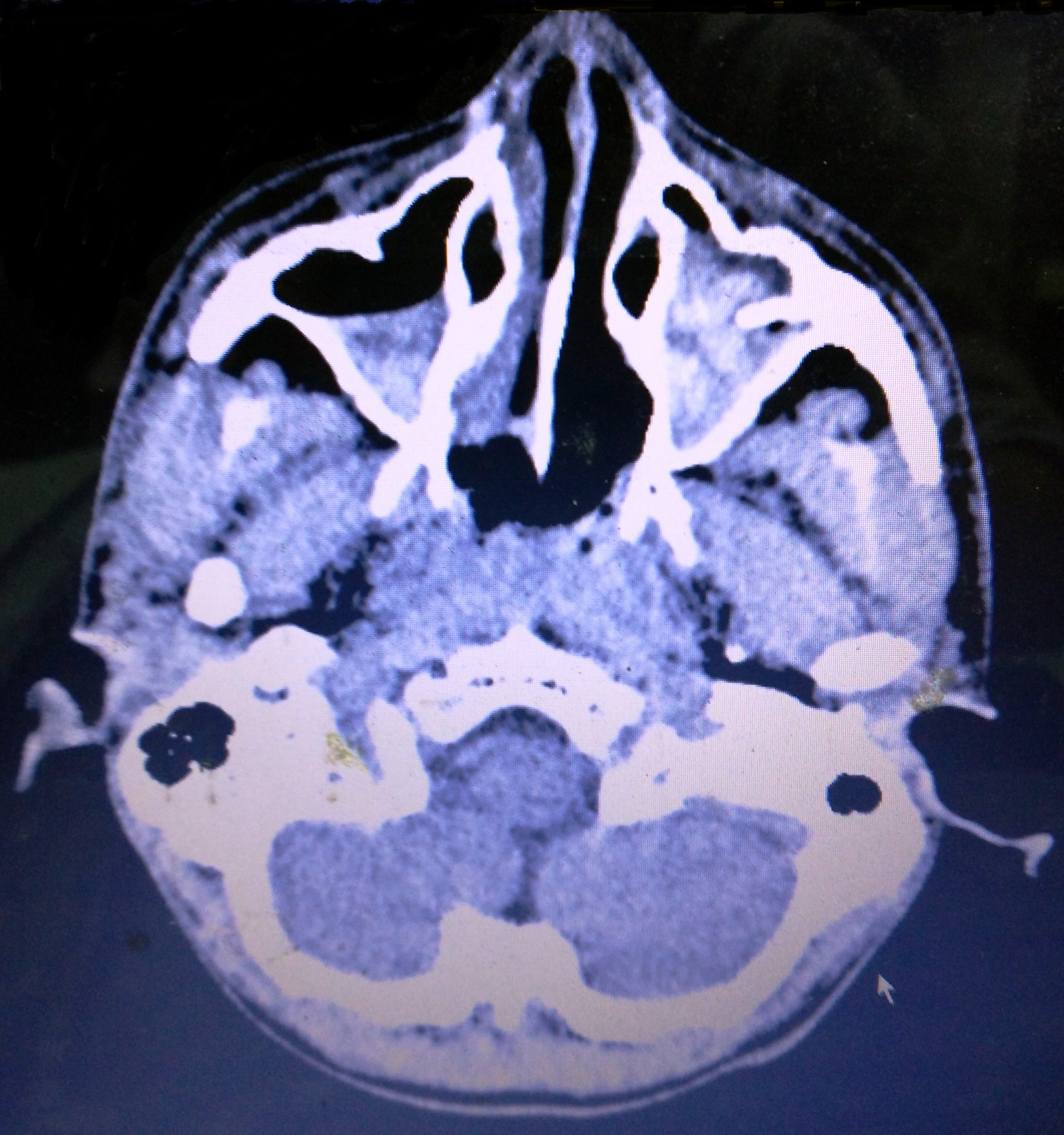
CT Brain showing air-fluid level in bilateral maxillary air sinuses post brain trauma. Maxillary sinusitis will also show similar air-fluid collection and should be ruled out from history taking.

Maxillary sinusitis is inflammation of the maxillary sinuses. The symptoms of sinusitis are headache, usually near the involved sinus, and foul-smelling nasal or pharyngeal discharge, possibly with some systemic signs of infection such as fever and weakness. The skin over the involved sinus can be tender, hot, and even reddened due to the inflammatory process in the area. On radiographs, there is opacification (or cloudiness) of the usually translucent sinus due to retained mucus.

Maxillary sinusitis is common due to the close anatomic relation of the frontal sinus, anterior ethmoidal sinus and the maxillary teeth, allowing for easy spread of infection. Differential diagnosis of dental problems needs to be done due to the close proximity to the teeth since the pain from sinusitis can seem to be dentally related. Furthermore, the drainage orifice lies near the roof of the sinus, and so the maxillary sinus does not drain well, and infection develops more easily. The maxillary sinus may drain into the mouth via an abnormal opening, an oroantral fistula, a particular risk after tooth extraction.

==== Oro-antral communication (OAC) ====
An OAC is an abnormal physical communication between the maxillary sinus and the mouth. This opening is only present when the structures that normally separates the mouth and sinus into 2 separate compartments are lost.

There are many causes of an OAC. The most common reason is following extraction of a posterior maxillary (upper) premolar or molar tooth. Other causes include trauma, pathology (e.g. tumours or cysts), infection or iatrogenic damage during surgery. Iatrogenic damage during dental treatment accounts for nearly half of the incidence of dental-related maxillary sinusitis. There is always a thin layer of mucous membrane (Schneiderian membrane) and usually bone between the roots of the upper back teeth and the floor of the maxillary sinus. However, the bone can vary in thickness in different individuals, ranging from complete absence to 12mm thick. Therefore, in certain individuals the membrane +/- the bony floor of the sinus can be perforated easily, creating an opening into the mouth when a tooth is extracted.

An OAC that is smaller than 2mm can heal spontaneously i.e. closure of the opening. Those that are larger than 2mm have a higher chance of developing into oro-antral fistula (OAF). The passage is only defined as an OAF if it is persistent and lined by epithelium. Epithelialisation happens when an OAC persist for at least 2–3 days and oral epithelial cells proliferate to line the defect. Large defects (more than 2mm) should be surgically closed as soon as possible to avoid accumulation of food and saliva which could contaminate the maxillary sinus, leading to infection (sinusitis). Various surgical techniques can be employed to manage an OAF but the most common involves pulling and stitching some soft tissue from the gum to cover the opening (i.e. soft tissue flap).

==== Sinusitis treatment ====
Traditionally the treatment of acute maxillary sinusitis is usually prescription of a broad-spectrum cephalosporin antibiotic resistant to beta-lactamase, administered for 10 days. Recent studies have found that the cause of chronic sinus infections lies in the nasal mucus, not in the nasal and sinus tissue targeted by standard treatment. This suggests a beneficial effect in treatments that target primarily the underlying and presumably damage-inflicting nasal and sinus membrane inflammation, instead of the secondary bacterial infection that has been the primary target of past treatments for the disease. Also, surgical procedures with chronic sinus infections are now changing with the direct removal of the mucus, which is loaded with toxins from the inflammatory cells, rather than the inflamed tissue during surgery. Leaving the mucus behind might predispose early recurrence of the chronic sinus infection. If any surgery is performed, it is to enlarge the ostia in the lateral walls of the nasal cavity, creating adequate drainage.

=== Cancer ===
Carcinoma of the maxillary sinus may invade the palate and cause dental pain. It may also block the nasolacrimal duct. Spread of the tumor into the orbit causes proptosis.

Maxillary sinus cancer that has spread to the brain

Maxillary sinus cancer that has spread to the lymph nodes

=== Age ===
With age, the enlarging maxillary sinus may even begin to surround the roots of the maxillary posterior teeth and extend its margins into the body of the zygomatic bone. If the maxillary posterior teeth are lost, the maxillary sinus may expand even more, thinning the bony floor of the alveolar process so that only a thin shell of bone is present.

== History ==
The maxillary sinus was first discovered and illustrated by Leonardo da Vinci, but the earliest attribution of significance was given to Nathaniel Highmore, the British surgeon and anatomist who described it in detail in his 1651 treatise.

== See also ==
- Ohngren's line
- Zygomatic complex fracture
