= Anterior superior alveolar artery =

Anterior superior alveolar arteries

Details
- Source: Infraorbital artery
- Supplies: Dental alveolus

Identifiers
- Latin: arteria alveolaris superior anterior
- TA98: A12.2.05.079
- TA2: 4451
- FMA: 71685

The anterior superior alveolar artery is one of the two or three superior alveolar arteries. It arises from the infraorbital artery. It passes through the canalis sinuosus. It provides arterial supply the upper incisor and canine teeth as well as the mucous membrane of the maxillary sinus.

== See also ==
- Anterior superior alveolar nerve
- Posterior superior alveolar artery
