= Infraorbital nerve =

Branch of the maxillary nerve supplying the face

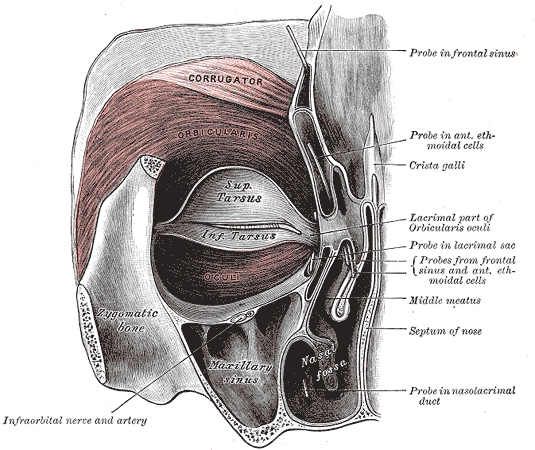
- Left orbicularis oculi, seen from behind. (Infraorbital nerve labeled at lower left.)

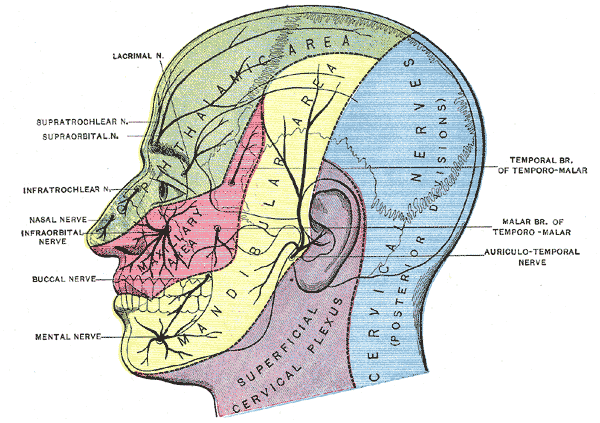
- Sensory areas of the head, showing the general distribution of the three divisions of the fifth nerve. (Infraorbital nerve labeled at center left, at the nose.)

Details
- From: Maxillary nerve
- To: Posterior superior alveolar nerve, middle superior alveolar nerve, anterior superior alveolar nerve, palpebral branches, nasal branches, superior labial branches

Identifiers
- Latin: nervus infraorbitalis
- TA98: A14.2.01.059
- TA2: 6239
- FMA: 52978

The infraorbital nerve is a branch of the maxillary nerve (itself a branch of the trigeminal nerve (CN V)). It arises in the pterygopalatine fossa. It passes through the inferior orbital fissure to enter the orbit. It travels through the orbit, then enters and traverses the infraorbital canal, exiting the canal at the infraorbital foramen to reach the face. It provides sensory innervation to the skin and mucous membranes around the middle of the face.

== Structure ==
=== Origin ===
The infraorbital nerve is a branch of the maxillary nerve (CN V_{2}), itself a branch of the trigeminal nerve (CN V); it may be considered as the terminal branch of the maxillary nerve. It arises from the maxillary nerve in the pterygopalatine fossa.

=== Course ===
It travels through the inferior orbital fissure to enter the orbit. It runs anteriorly along the floor of the orbit in the infraorbital groove to the infraorbital canal of the maxilla. Within the infraorbital canal it has three branches, the posterior superior alveolar nerve, middle superior alveolar nerve and anterior superior alveolar nerve. After traversing the canal it emerges onto the anterior surface of the maxilla through the infraorbital foramen. Here, it divides into its terminal branches; palpebral, nasal and superior labial.

=== Branches ===
Within infraorbital canal from proximal to distal:

- posterior superior alveolar nerve.
- middle superior alveolar nerve.
- anterior superior alveolar nerve.

After it exits the infraorbital foramen:

- palpebral branches.
- nasal branches.
- superior labial branches.

The palpebral branches ascend deep to the orbicularis oculi and pierce the muscle to supply the skin of the lower eyelid. The nasal branches supply the skin of the side of the nose and the moveable part of the nasal septum. The superior labial branches descend deep to the levator labii superioris to supply the skin of the anterior cheek and upper lip.

=== Relations ===
Along its course, the infraorbital nerve is accompanied by the infraorbital artery and vein.

=== Distribution ===
The infraorbital nerve provides sensory innervation to the skin of the lower eyelid, the side of the nose, the moveable part of nasal septum, the anterior cheek, and part of the upper lip. It does not provide motor supply to any muscles.

== Clinical significance ==
=== Infraorbital nerve block ===
The infraorbital nerve is often blocked with local anesthetic to induce analgesia. This may be due to chronic pain, or during dental or surgical procedures of the face such as for the management of postoperative pain associated with cleft lip correction. The needle is inserted (aiming medially) near to the infraorbital foramen, which can be palpated. The nerve may be blocked using either a transcutaneous or intraoral approach.

=== Trigeminal neuralgia ===
The infraorbital nerve can be implicated in trigeminal neuralgia, where patients have severe orofacial pain.

=== Orbital fracture ===
A fracture of the floor of the orbit can injure the infraorbital nerve resulting in anesthesia in its sensory distribution.
