= Anterior superior alveolar nerve =

Branch of the infraorbital nerve

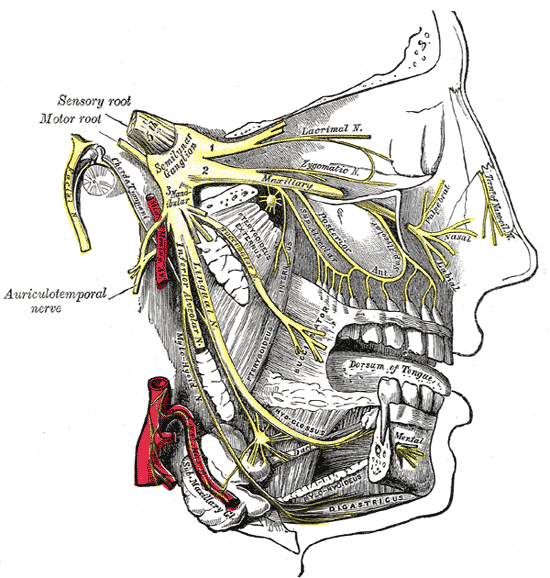
- Distribution of the maxillary and mandibular nerves, and the submaxillary ganglion.

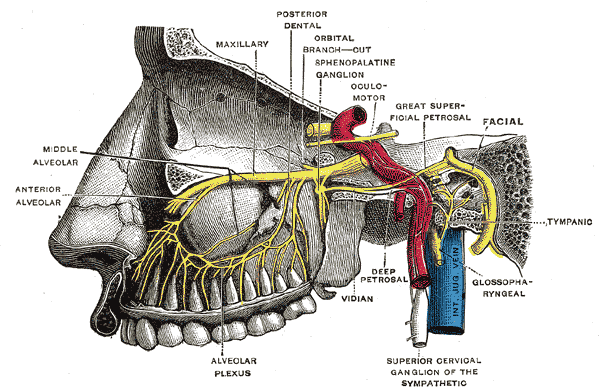
- Alveolar branches of superior maxillary nerve and sphenopalatine ganglion.

Details
- From: Infraorbital nerve
- Innervates: Dental alveolus

Identifiers
- Latin: rami alveolares superiores anteriores nervi maxillaris, ramus alveolaris superior anteriores
- TA98: A14.2.01.052
- TA2: 6241
- FMA: 52935

The anterior superior alveolar nerve (or anterior superior dental nerve) is a sensory branch of the infraorbital nerve (itself a branch of the maxillary nerve (CN V_{2})). It passes through the canalis sinuosus and descends in the anterior wall of the maxillary sinus. It contributes to the superior dental plexus and provides sensory innervation to the upper front teeth and adjacent structures. Through its nasal branch, it also innervates parts of the nasal cavity. It is clinically relevant in dental anesthesia and procedures involving the anterior maxilla.

== Anatomy ==
=== Course and distribution ===
It branches from the infraorbital nerve within the infraorbital canal at around the midpoint of this canal and enters the canalis sinuosus. It passes through towards the nose before passing inferior-ward and ramifying into branches which innervate the upper/maxillary incisor and canine teeth; it usually innervates all the anterior teeth.

==== Nasal branch ====
It issues a nasal branch which passes through a minute canal in the lateral wall of the inferior nasal meatus and innervates the mucous membrane of the floor and anterior portion of lateral wall (as far superiorly as the opening of the maxillary sinus) of the nasal cavity. It ultimately emerges close to the root of the anterior nasal spine to innervate the adjacent portion of nasal septum.

=== Communications ===
The nerve participates in the formation of the superior dental plexus by looping posterior-ward to communicate with the middle superior alveolar nerve.

The nasal branch communicates with nasal branches of the sphenopalatine ganglion.

== See also ==
- Anterior superior alveolar arteries
- Alveolar nerve (Dental nerve)

- Superior alveolar nerve (Superior dental nerve)

- Middle superior alveolar nerve (Middle superior dental nerve)
- Posterior superior alveolar nerve (Posterior superior dental nerve)

- Inferior alveolar nerve (Inferior dental nerve)
