= Inferior dental plexus =

Nerve

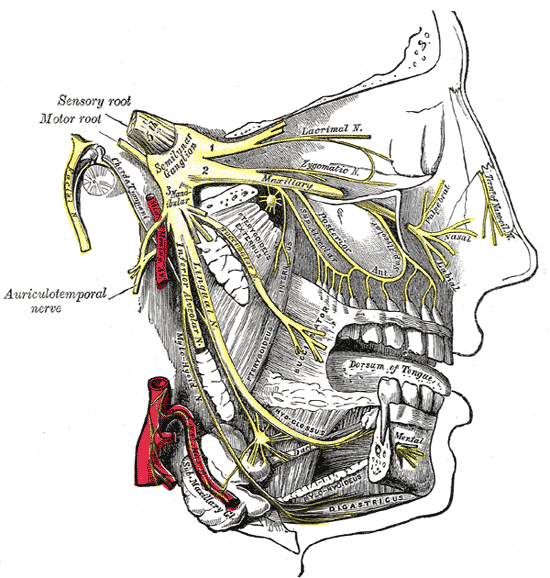
- Distribution of the maxillary and mandibular nerves, and the submaxillary ganglion.

Details
- From: inferior alveolar nerve

Identifiers
- Latin: plexus dentalis inferior
- TA98: A14.2.01.091
- TA2: 6276
- FMA: 53263

The inferior dental plexus is a nerve plexus formed by sensory branches of the inferior alveolar nerve. The plexus issues dental branches and gingival branches; the small dental branches provide sensory innervation to the lower/mandibular teeth.

Note that the lower premolar, canine and incisor teeth as well as their associated gingiva are innervated by the incisive branch of the inferior alveolar nerve (which may or may not form an incisive plexus).

== See also ==
- Superior dental plexus
