= Superior dental plexus =

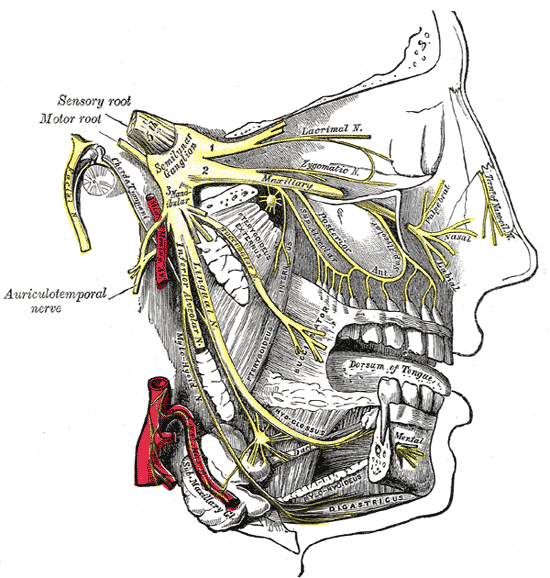
- Distribution of the maxillary and mandibular nerves, and the submaxillary ganglion.

Details

Identifiers
- Latin: plexus dentalis superior
- TA98: A14.2.01.053
- TA2: 6236
- FMA: 77528

The superior dental plexus is a nerve plexus that innervates the upper/maxillary teeth and as adjacent structures. It is formed by the anterior superior alveolar nerve (ASAN), middle superior alveolar nerve (MSAN), and the posterior superior alveolar nerve (PSAN). It issues dental branches and gingival branches.

A cadaveric study found the plexus to be situated in the alveolar process of the maxilla.

== Anatomy ==
The PSAN forms the posterior portion of the plexus and is distributed to the upper molar teeth and adjacent gingiva as well as the mucosa of the cheek.

The MSAN forms the middle portion of the plexus and is distributed to the upper premolar teeth and the lateral wall of the maxillary sinus.

The ASAN forms the anterior portion of the plexus and is distributed to the canine and incisor teeth as well as the anterior portion of the maxillary sinus.

== See also ==
- Inferior dental plexus
