= Inferior alveolar nerve anaesthesia =

Medical nerve block technique

Inferior alveolar nerve block (abbreviated to IANB, and also termed inferior alveolar nerve anesthesia or inferior dental block) is a nerve block technique which induces anesthesia (numbness) in the areas of the mouth and face innervated by one of the inferior alveolar nerves which are paired on the left and right side. These areas are the skin and mucous membranes of the lower lip, the skin of the chin, the lower teeth and the labial gingiva of the anterior teeth, all unilaterally to the midline of the side on which the block is administered. However, depending on technique, the long buccal nerve may not be anesthetized by an IANB and therefore an area of buccal gingiva adjacent to the lower posterior teeth will retain normal sensation unless that nerve is anesthetized separately, via a (long) buccal nerve block. The inferior alveolar nerve is a branch of the mandibular nerve, the third division of the trigeminal nerve. This procedure attempts to anaesthetise the inferior alveolar nerve prior to it entering the mandibular foramen on the medial surface of the mandibular ramus.

== Symptoms of anesthesia ==
Administration of anesthesia near the mandibular foramen causes blockage of the inferior alveolar nerve and the nearby lingual nerve by diffusion (includes supplying the tongue). This causes patients to lose sensation in:

- their mandibular teeth on one side (via inferior alveolar nerve block)
- their lower lip and chin on one side (via mental nerve block)
- and parts of their tongue and lingual gingival tissue on one side except on the cheek side of the mandibular molars (via lingual nerve block); a buccal block will anesthetize this later tissue area.

Another symptom is harmless numbness and tingling of the body of the tongue and floor of the mouth, which indicates that the lingual nerve, a branch of the mandibular nerve, is anesthetized. Another symptom that can occur is “lingual shock” as the needle passes by the lingual nerve during administration. The patient may make an involuntary movement, varying from a slight opening of the eyes to jumping in the chair. This symptom is only momentary, and anesthesia will quickly occur.

== Injection techniques ==
There are a number of techniques that are commonly used to achieve inferior alveolar nerve anesthesia. The most commonly used techniques involve an attempted block of an entire portion of the inferior alveolar nerve:

- Inferior alveolar nerve block or IANB - The nerve is approached from the opposite side of the mouth over the contralateral premolars. After piercing the mandibular tissue on the medial border of the mandibular ramus within the pterygomandibular space and then contacting medial surface of the alveolar bone as well as being lateral to the pterygomandibular fold and the sphenomandibular ligament, the injection is given.
- Gow-Gates technique - Invented by Australian dentist George A.E. Gow-Gates in the mid-1970s, the needle is directed at the neck of the condyle just under the insertion of the lateral pterygoid muscle. This is used for more extensive anesthesia or when there is failure of the IANB
- Vazirani-Akinosi technique - Invented by Sunder J. Vazirani in 1960 and later reintroduced in 1977 by Oyekunle J. Akinosi, a closed-mouth injection technique, the syringe is "advanced parallel to the maxillary occlusal plane at the level of the maxillary mucogingival junction." This is used when the patient cannot open his mouth enough for the IANB.

== Complications ==
- The most common adverse effect of this injection is accidental self-inflicted trauma after the procedure, either by biting the lip or tongue or by thermal burn caused by inadvertent drinking of fluid that is too hot. This classically occurs in children or those with learning disability.
- A blood vessel may be punctured accidentally and a hematoma or "blood blister" may occur that will heal over time.
- If needle is positioned too posteriorly, anesthetic may be put into parotid gland, that may cause transient facial paralysis of the facial nerve or cranial Nerve VII (7). Symptoms of this temporary loss of the use of the muscles of facial expression include the inability to close the eyelid and the drooping of the labial commissure on the affected side. The transient facial paralysis recovers after a few hours.
- Also if the needle is placed too medially the medial pterygoid muscle can be injected, resulting in trismus.
- The sphenomandibular ligament may act as a barrier to the agent if the injection is given too shallow and the lingual nerve is only anesthetized.
- This injection can rarely cause needle tract infections of the pterygomandibular space. This is because the mouth contains many types of bacteria which are normally harmless by virtue of the physical barrier that the mucosa presents. However, if they are inoculated into the tissues during an injection, they can become pathogenic (disease causing).
