= Infraorbital canal =

Canal found at the base of the orbit that opens on to the maxilla

Details

Identifiers
- Latin: canalis infraorbitalis
- TA98: A02.1.12.004
- TA2: 759

The infraorbital canal is a canal found at the base of the orbit that opens on to the maxilla. It is continuous with the infraorbital groove and opens onto the maxilla at the infraorbital foramen. The infraorbital nerve and infraorbital artery travel through the canal.

== Structure ==
One of the canals of the orbital surface of the maxilla, the infraorbital canal, opens just below the margin of the orbit, the area of the skull containing the eye and related structures. It should not be confused with the infraorbital foramen, with which it is continuous.

== Function ==
It transmits the infraorbital nerve as well as infraorbital artery, both of which enter this canal at the infraorbital groove and after coursing through the maxillary sinus exit via the infraorbital foramen. Before exiting, the anterior superior alveolar nerve, middle superior alveolar nerve and corresponding arteries will branch off.
