= Posterior superior alveolar nerve =

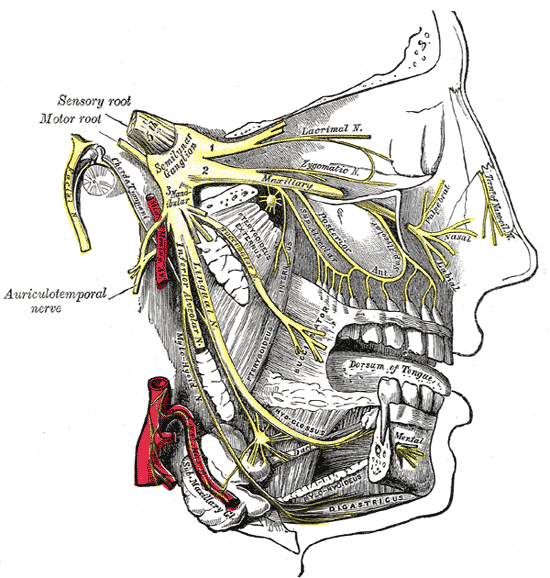
- Distribution of the maxillary and mandibular nerves, and the submaxillary ganglion. (Posterior sup. alveolar labeled at center.)

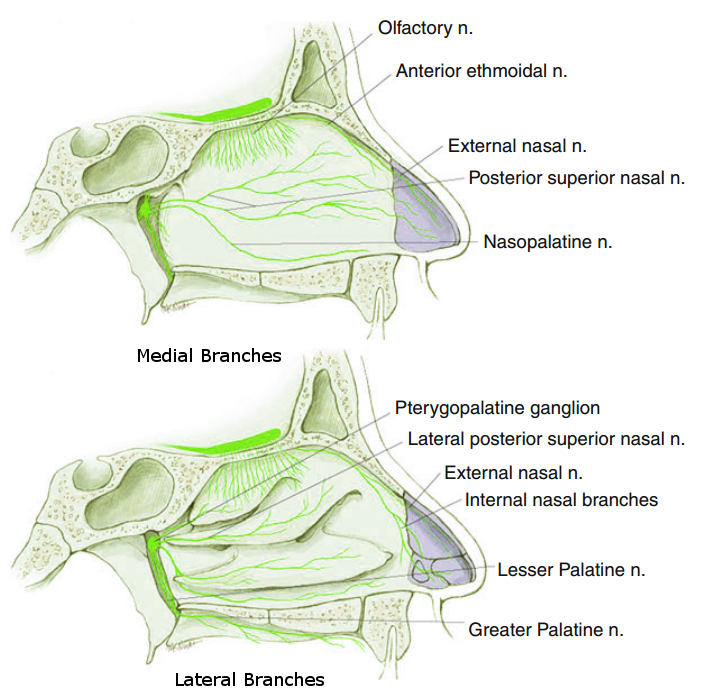
- A sketch of the posterior super nasal nerve

Details
- Innervates: Maxillary sinus, molars, dental alveolus

Identifiers
- Latin: rami alveolares superiores posteriores nervi maxillaris
- TA98: A14.2.01.050
- TA2: 6235
- FMA: 75545

The posterior superior alveolar nerves (also posterior superior dental nerves or posterior superior alveolar branches) are sensory branches of the maxillary nerve (CN V_{2}). They arise within the pterygopalatine fossa as a single trunk. They run on or in the maxilla. They provide sensory innervation to the upper molar teeth and adjacent gum, and the maxillary sinus.

== Anatomy ==
=== Origin ===
The nerves arise from the trunk of the maxillary nerve (CN V_{2}) within the pterygopalatine fossa just before it enters the infraorbital groove.

The nerve arises as a single trunk which split into 2-3 nerves within the pterygopalatine fossa.

=== Course ===
The nerves exit the pterygopalatine fossa through the pterygomaxillary fissure. They pass within or upon the posterior wall of the maxilla.

They descend on the tuberosity of the maxilla and give off several twigs to the gums and neighboring parts of the mucous membrane of the cheek.

They then enter the alveolar canals on the infratemporal surface of the maxilla, and, passing from behind forward in the substance of the bone, communicate with the middle superior alveolar nerve, and give off branches to the lining membrane of the maxillary sinus and gingival and dental branches to each molar tooth from a superior dental plexus; these branches enter the apical foramina at the roots of the teeth.

=== Distribution ===
The nerves provide sensory innervation to the upper/maxillary molar teeth and the associated gingiva of the vestibule, and the maxillary sinus.

==== Teeth ====
The nerve innervates the second and third maxillary/upper molar teeth, and two of the three roots of the maxillary/upper first molar tooth (all but the mesiobuccal root).

== Clinical significance ==
When giving a posterior superior alveolar nerve block, it will anesthetize the mesialbuccal root of the maxillary/upper first molar tooth approximately 72% of the time.

== See also ==
- Alveolar nerve (Dental nerve)

- Superior alveolar nerve (Superior dental nerve)

- Anterior superior alveolar nerve (Anterior superior dental nerve)
- Middle superior alveolar nerve (Middle superior dental nerve)

- Inferior alveolar nerve (Inferior dental nerve)

== Additional images ==
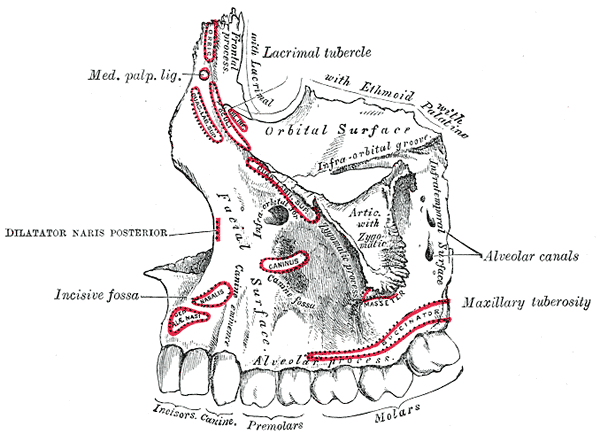
Left maxilla. Outer surface.
