= Posterior superior alveolar artery =

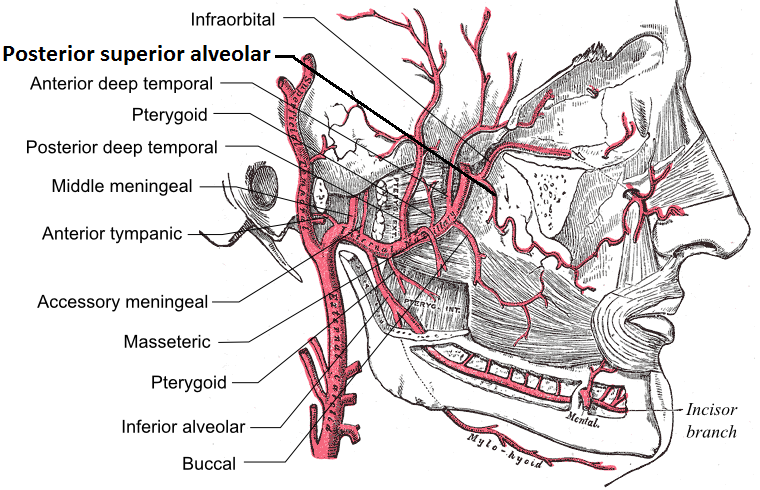
- Plan of branches of maxillary artery

- Plan of branches of maxillary artery. (Post. sup. alveolar in lower right.)

Details
- Branches: Branches to alveolar canals branches to gingiva
- Supplies: Molar and premolar teeth lining of the maxillary sinus gingiva

Identifiers
- Latin: arteria alveolaris superior posterior
- TA98: A12.2.05.075
- TA2: 4444
- FMA: 49757

The posterior superior alveolar artery (posterior dental artery) is a branch of the maxillary artery. It is one of two or three superior alveolar arteries. It provides arterial supply to the molar and premolar teeth, maxillary sinus and adjacent bone, and the gingiva.

== Anatomy ==
=== Origin ===
The artery typically arises from maxillary artery within the pterygopalatine fossa. It frequently arises in conjunction with the infraorbital artery.

=== Course ===
It passes inferior-ward upon the infratemporal surface of maxilla before ramifying.

=== Branches ===
It emits branches that pass through foramina on the posterior aspect of the maxilla alongside the posterior superior alveolar nerves.

Some branches enter the alveolar canals to supply the upper molar and premolar teeth as well as the maxillary sinus and adjacent bone.

Some branches pass anterior-ward across the alveolar process to supply the gingiva.

== See also ==
- Anterior superior alveolar arteries
- Posterior superior alveolar nerve

== Additional images ==
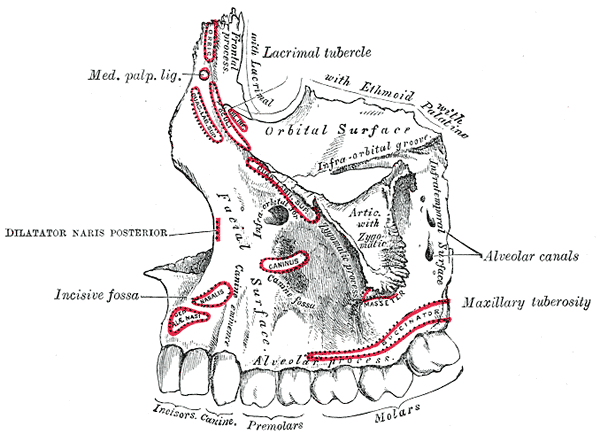
Left maxilla. Outer surface.
