= Dental alveolus =

Tooth socket

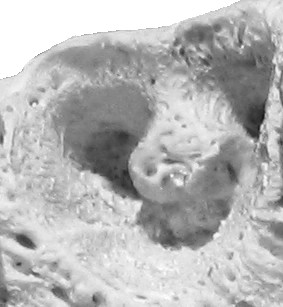
- Alveola of the second premolar tooth in a bovine maxillary bone

Details
- Artery: Anterior superior alveolar arteries, posterior superior alveolar artery, inferior alveolar artery
- Nerve: Anterior superior alveolar nerve, posterior superior alveolar nerve, inferior alveolar nerve

Identifiers
- Latin: alveolus dentalis
- MeSH: D020390
- TA98: A03.1.03.008
- FMA: 57490

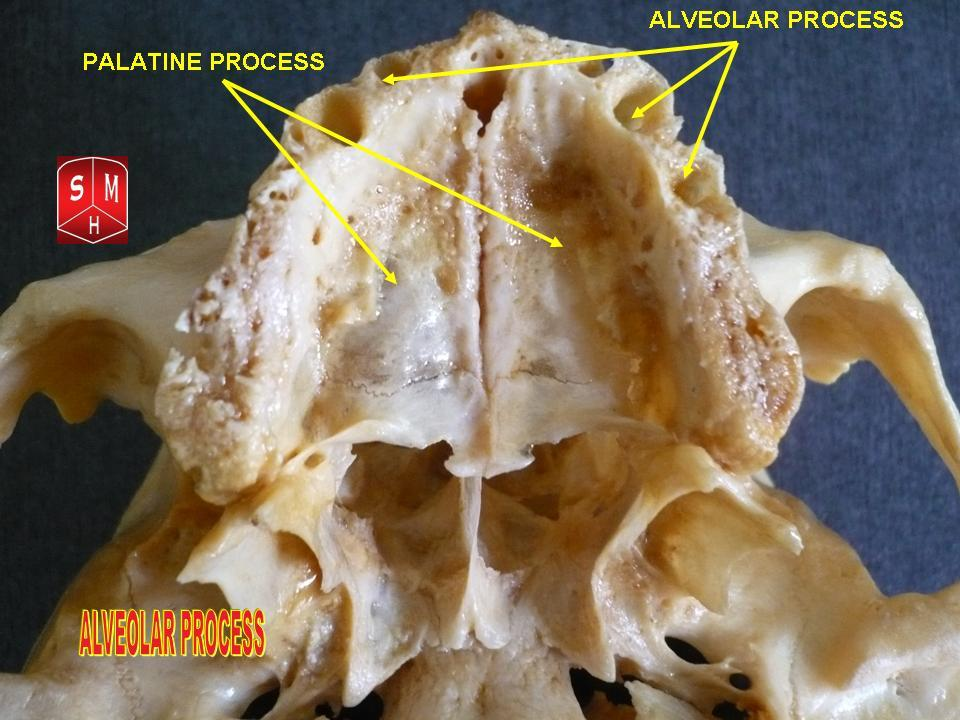
Alveolar process of maxilla, seen from below

Dental alveoli (singular alveolus) are sockets in the jaws in which the roots of teeth are held in the alveolar process with the periodontal ligament. The lay term for dental alveoli is tooth sockets. A joint that connects the roots of the teeth and the alveolus is called a gomphosis (plural gomphoses). Alveolar bone is the bone that surrounds the roots of the teeth forming bone sockets.

In mammals, tooth sockets are found in the maxilla, the premaxilla, and the mandible.

== Etymology ==
1706, "a hollow", especially "the socket of a tooth", from Latin alveolus "a tray, trough, basin; bed of a small river; small hollow or cavity", diminutive of alvus "belly, stomach, paunch, bowels; hold of a ship", from PIE root *aulo- "hole, cavity" (source also of Greek aulos "flute, tube, pipe"; Serbo-Croatian, Polish, Russian ulica "street", originally "narrow opening"; Old Church Slavonic uliji, Lithuanian aulys "beehive" (hollow trunk), Armenian yli "pregnant"). The word was extended in 19c. anatomy to other small pits, sockets, or cells.

== Socket preservation ==
Socket preservation or alveolar ridge preservation (ARP) is a procedure to reduce bone loss after tooth extraction to preserve the dental alveolus (tooth socket) in the alveolar bone. A platelet-rich fibrin (PRF) membrane containing bone growth enhancing elements can be stitched over the wound or a graft material or scaffold is placed in the socket of an extracted tooth. The socket is then directly closed with stitches or covered with a non-resorbable or resorbable membrane and sutured.

== Pathology ==
The swelling of the dental alveoli can result in alveolitis, causing pain and discomfort to the mouth.

== See also ==
- Alveolar ridge
- Polyphyodont
