= Labial glands =

Glands in the mouth

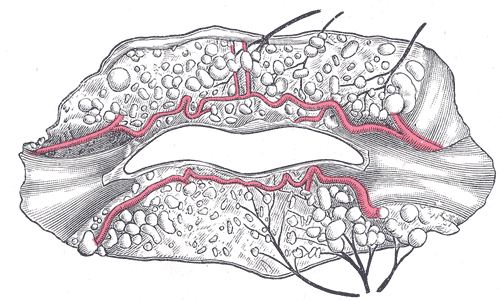
- The labial coronary arteries, the glands of the lips, and the nerves of the right side seen from the posterior surface after removal

Details
- Artery: Inferior labial

Identifiers
- Latin: glandulae labiales oris
- TA98: A05.1.02.014
- TA2: 2813
- FMA: 71613

The labial glands are minor salivary glands situated between the mucous membrane and the orbicularis oris around the orifice of the mouth.

They are circular in form, and about the size of small peas; their ducts open by minute orifices upon the mucous membrane.

Like the parotid and buccal glands, the labial glands are innervated by parasympathetic fibres that arise in the inferior salivatory nucleus, travel with the glossopharyngeal nerve and lesser petrosal nerve to the otic ganglion, where they synapse and then continue to the labial glands. Sympathetic innervation is mediated by postganglionary fibres which arise in the superior cervical ganglion and pass through the otic ganglion without synapsing.
