= Inferior alveolar nerve =

Branch of the mandibular nerve

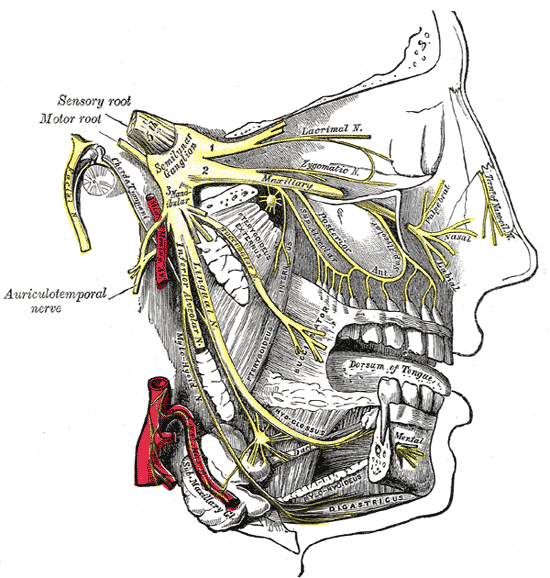
- Distribution of the maxillary and mandibular nerves, and the submaxillary ganglion. (Inferior alveolar visible at center left.)

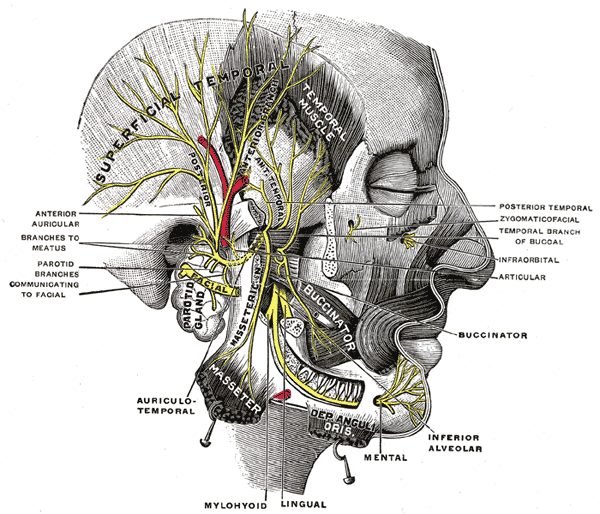
- Mandibular division of the trigeminal nerve. (Inferior alveolar labeled at bottom right.)

Details
- From: Mandibular nerve
- To: Mylohyoid, dental, incisive, and mental
- Innervates: Dental alveolus

Identifiers
- Latin: nervus alveolaris inferior
- TA98: A14.2.01.089
- TA2: 6274
- FMA: 53243

The inferior alveolar nerve (IAN) (also the inferior dental nerve) is a sensory branch of the mandibular nerve (CN V_{3}) (which is itself the third branch of the trigeminal nerve (CN V)). The nerve provides sensory innervation to the lower/mandibular teeth and their corresponding gingiva as well as a small area of the face (via its mental nerve).

== Structure ==
=== Origin ===
The inferior alveolar nerve arises from the mandibular nerve.

=== Course ===
After branching from the mandibular nerve, the inferior alveolar nerve passes posterior to the lateral pterygoid muscle. It issues a branch (the mylohyoid nerve) before entering the mandibular foramen to come to pass in the mandibular canal within the mandible. Passing through the canal, it issues sensory branches for the molar and second premolar teeth; the branches first form the inferior dental plexus which then gives off small gingival and dental nerves to these teeth themselves.

The nerve terminates distally/anteriorly (near the second lower premolar) within the mandibular canal by splitting into its two terminal branches: the mental nerve, and the incisive branch.

=== Branches ===
==== Mental nerve ====
The mental nerve emerges from the mandibular canal through the mental foramen and provides sensory innervation to the chin and lower lip.

==== Incisive branch ====
The incisive branch represents the anterior continuation of the inferior alveolar nerve. It continues to course within the mandible in the mandibular incisive canal either as a single nerve or by forming the incisive plexus. It provides sensory innervation to the lower/mandibular premolar, canine, incisor teeth as well as their associated gingiva.

=== Distribution ===
The inferior alveolar nerves supply sensation to the lower teeth, and, via the mental nerve, sensation to the chin and lower lip.

The mylohyoid nerve is a motor nerve supplying the mylohyoid and the anterior belly of the digastric.

=== Variation ===
Rarely, a bifid inferior alveolar nerve may be present, in which case a second mandibular foramen, more inferiorly placed, exists and can be detected by noting a doubled mandibular canal on a radiograph.

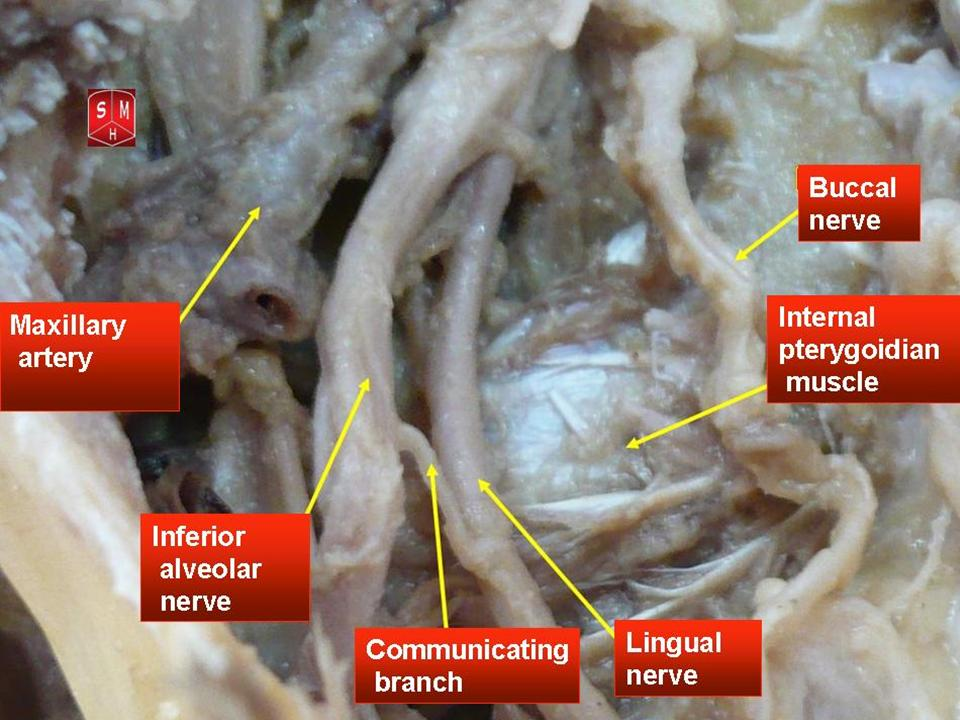
Inferior alveolar nerve

== Clinical significance ==
=== Injury ===
Inferior nerve injury most commonly occurs during surgery including wisdom tooth, dental implant placement in the mandible, root canal treatment where tooth roots are close to the nerve canal in the mandible, deep dental local anaesthetic injections or orthognathic surgery. Trauma and related mandibular fractures are also often related to inferior alveolar nerve injuries.

Trigeminal sensory nerve injuries are associated with numbness, pain, altered sensation and usually a combination of all three. This can result in a significant reduction in quality of life with functional difficulties and psychological impact.

The risk associated with wisdom tooth surgery is commonly accepted to be 2% temporary and 0.2% permanent. However, this risk assessment is not concrete as the same source is cited for lingual nerve paresthesia. It is well documented that inferior alveolar nerve injury is more common than lingual nerve injury. The percentage of injury varies significantly in different studies. Furthermore, many factors affect the incidence of nerve injury. For example, the incidence of nerve injury in teens removing third molars is much lower than the incidence in patients 25 and older. This risk increases 10 fold if the tooth is close to the inferior dental canal containing the inferior alveolar nerve (as judged on a dental radiograph). These high risk wisdom teeth can be further assessed using cone beam CT imaging to assess and plan surgery to minimise nerve injury by careful extraction or undertaking a coronectomy procedure in healthy patients with healthy teeth.

The risk of nerve injury in relation to mandibular dental implants is not known but it is a recognised risk requiring the patient to be warned. If an injury occurs urgent treatment is required. The risk nerve injury in relation deep dental injections has a risk of injury in approximately 1:14,000 with 25% of these remaining persistent. Routine preoperative warnings about these injuries should occur before surgery, and represent good practice. Inferior alveolar nerve injury secondary to orthodontic treatment is also emerging in the literature in the recent years as a rare complication and manifested as anesthesia, paresthesia, or combination of both; however full recovery was achieved in all of the reported cases when proper management was applied.

=== Anesthesia ===
During dental procedures, a local nerve block may be applied. Anaesthetic injected near the mandibular foramen to block the inferior alveolar nerve and the nearby lingual nerve (supplying the tongue). This causes loss of sensation on the same side as the block to:

- the teeth (inferior alveolar nerve block)
- the lower lip and chin (mental nerve block)
- front two-thirds of the tongue (lingual nerve block).

Studies found that oral medications of NSAIDs taken before the dental procedure increases the efficacy of the anesthesia in patients with irreversible pulpitis.

== See also ==
- Alveolar nerve (Dental nerve)

- Superior alveolar nerve (Superior dental nerve)

- Anterior superior alveolar nerve (Anterior superior dental nerve)
- Middle superior alveolar nerve (Middle superior dental nerve)
- Posterior superior alveolar nerve (Posterior superior dental nerve)

== Additional images ==
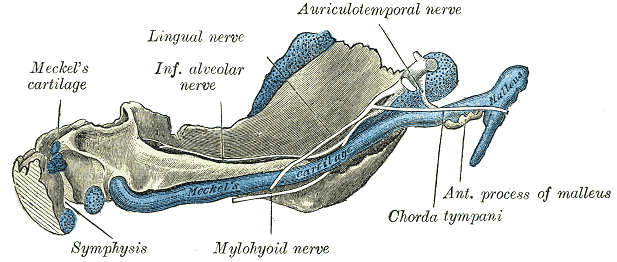
Mandible of human embryo 95 mm long. Inner aspect. Nuclei of cartilage stippled.

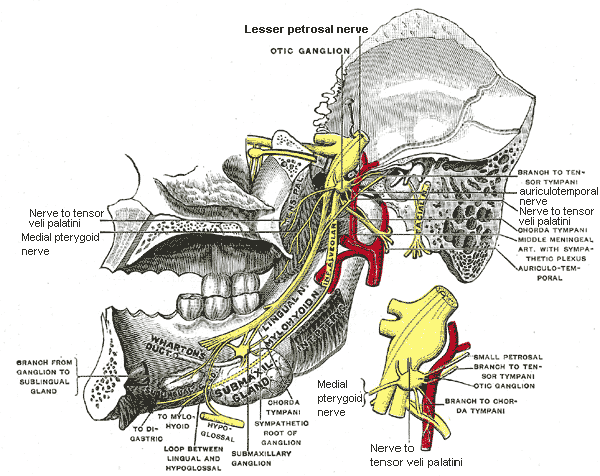
Mandibular division of trifacial nerve, seen from the middle line.

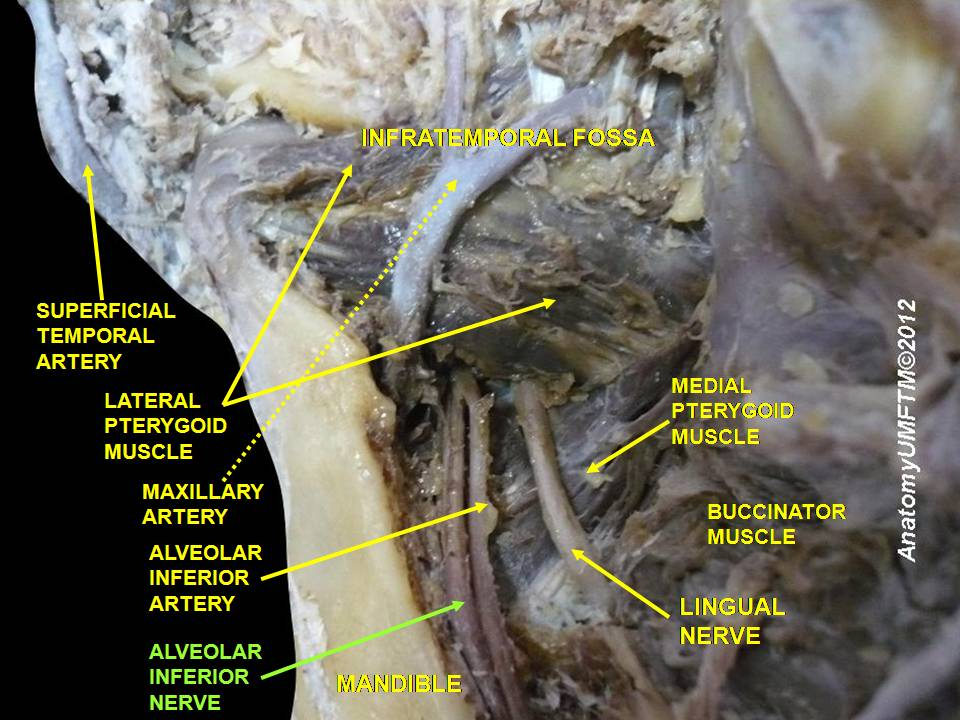
Inferior alveolar nerve

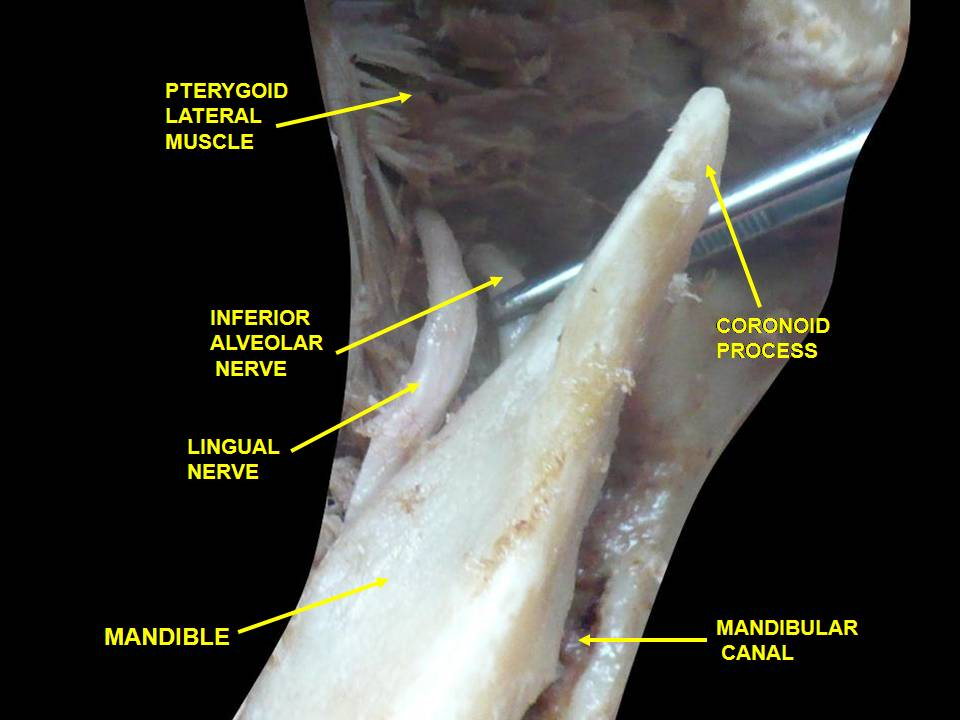
Mandibular nerve and bone. Deep dissection. Anterior view.

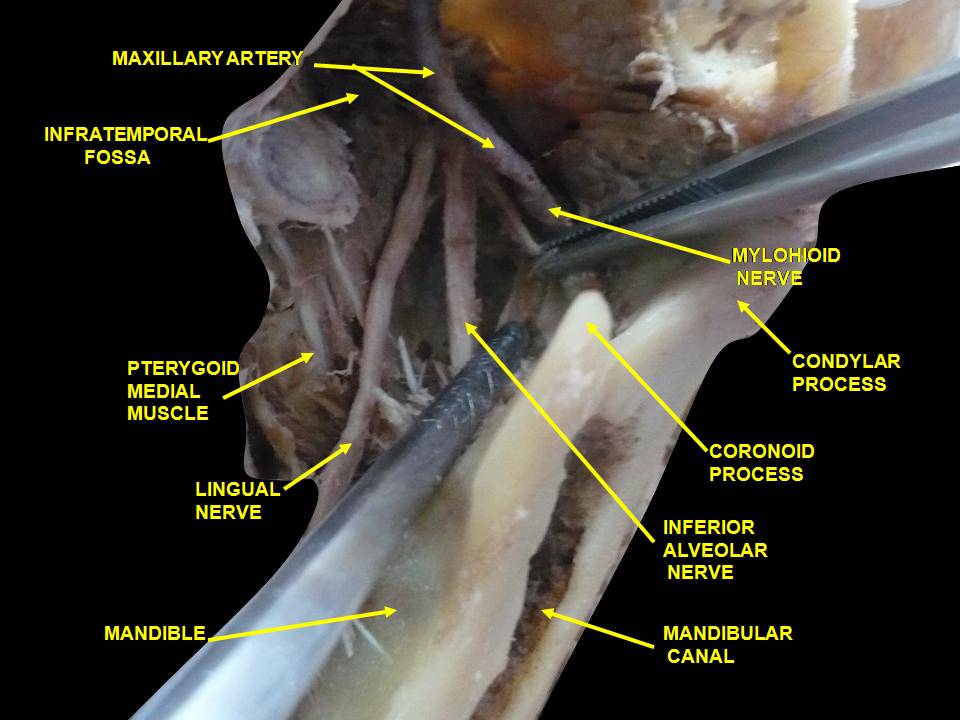
Infratemporal fossa. Lingual and inferior alveolar nerve. Deep dissection. Anterolateral view
