= Alveolar nerve =

Nerves of the face

Alveolar nerve is an anatomical and dental term for the sensory branches of the trigeminal nerve that innervate the teeth and surrounding alveolar process of the jaws. In the upper jaw, the maxillary nerve gives rise to the superior alveolar nerves, classically described as anterior, middle, and posterior, which contribute to a superior dental plexus supplying the maxillary teeth and adjacent gingiva; the anterior superior alveolar nerve commonly runs in the anterior wall of the maxillary sinus and may also supply branches to sinus mucosa.

In the lower jaw, the inferior alveolar nerve arises from the mandibular nerve and gives off a motor branch to the mylohyoid and anterior belly of the digastric muscle before entering the mandibular canal via the mandibular foramen, and supplies the mandibular teeth and lower alveolar ridge; it exits at the mental foramen as the mental nerve to supply the lower lip and chin.

The alveolar nerves are clinically important in dentistry and oral and maxillofacial surgery because they are targets for regional anesthesia and can be injured during procedures.
