= Alveolar canals =

Apertures in the maxilla

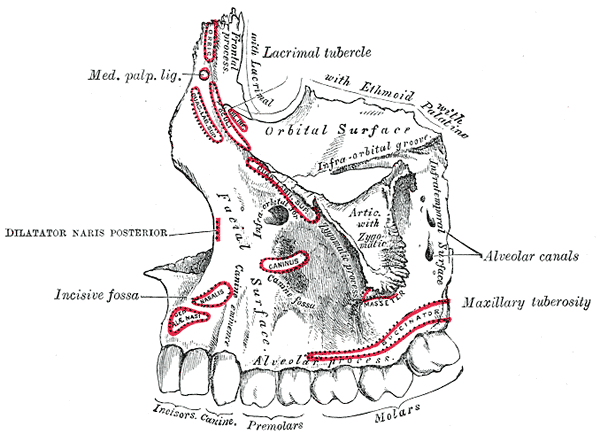
- Left maxilla. Outer surface (alveolar canals labeled at center right)

Details

Identifiers
- Latin: canales alveolares maxillae
- TA98: A02.1.12.015
- TA2: 772
- FMA: 57743

The alveolar canals are apertures in the center of the infratemporal surface of the maxilla. The alveolar canals transmit the posterior superior alveolar vessels and nerves.
