= Maxillary nerve =

Branch of the trigeminal nerve responsible for the mid-face

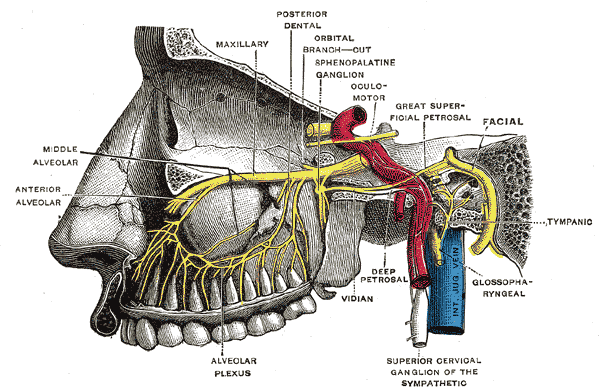
- Alveolar branches of superior maxillary nerve and pterygopalatine ganglion.

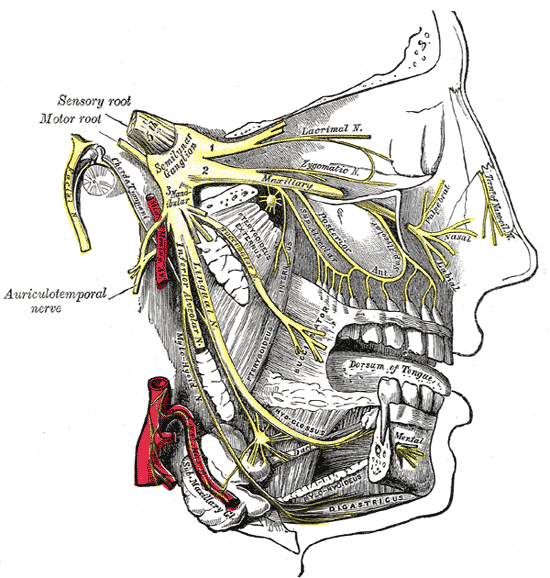
- Distribution of the maxillary and mandibular nerves, and the submaxillary ganglion.

Details
- From: Trigeminal nerve
- To: Infraorbital nerve, zygomatic nerve, palatine nerve, nasopalatine nerve, sphenopalatine ganglion

Identifiers
- Latin: nervus maxillaris
- MeSH: D008442
- TA98: A14.2.01.037
- TA2: 6216
- FMA: 52724

In neuroanatomy, the maxillary nerve (V_{2}) is one of the three branches or divisions of the trigeminal nerve, the fifth (CN V) cranial nerve. It comprises the principal functions of sensation from the maxilla, nasal cavity, sinuses, the palate and subsequently that of the mid-face, and is intermediate, both in position and size, between the ophthalmic nerve and the mandibular nerve.

== Structure ==
It begins at the middle of the trigeminal ganglion as a flattened plexiform band then it passes through the lateral wall of the cavernous sinus. It leaves the skull through the foramen rotundum, where it becomes more cylindrical in form, and firmer in texture. After leaving foramen rotundum it gives two branches to the pterygopalatine ganglion. It then crosses the pterygopalatine fossa, inclines lateralward on the back of the maxilla, and enters the orbit through the inferior orbital fissure. It then runs forward on the floor of the orbit, at first in the infraorbital groove and then in the infraorbital canal remaining outside the periosteum of the orbit. It then emerges on the face through the infraorbital foramen and terminates by dividing into inferior palpebral, lateral nasal and superior labial branches. The nerve is accompanied by the infraorbital branch of (the third part of) the maxillary artery and the accompanying vein.

=== Branches ===
Its branches may be divided into four groups, depending upon where they branch off: in the cranium, in the pterygopalatine fossa, in the infraorbital canal, or on the face.

==== In the cranium ====
- Middle meningeal nerve in the meninges

==== From the pterygopalatine fossa ====
- Zygomatic nerve (zygomaticotemporal nerve, zygomaticofacial nerve), through the Inferior orbital fissure
- Nasopalatine nerve, through the sphenopalatine foramen
- Posterior superior alveolar nerve
- Greater and lesser palatine nerves
- Pharyngeal nerve

==== In the infraorbital canal ====
- Middle superior alveolar nerve
- Anterior superior alveolar nerve
- Infraorbital nerve

==== On the face ====
- Inferior palpebral nerve
- Superior labial nerve
- Lateral nasal nerve

== Function ==
The Maxillary nerve gives cutaneous branches to the face. It also carries parasympathetic preganglionic fibers (sphenopalatine) and postganglionic fibers (zygomatic, greater and lesser palatine and nasopalatine) to and from the pterygopalatine ganglion.

== Additional images ==
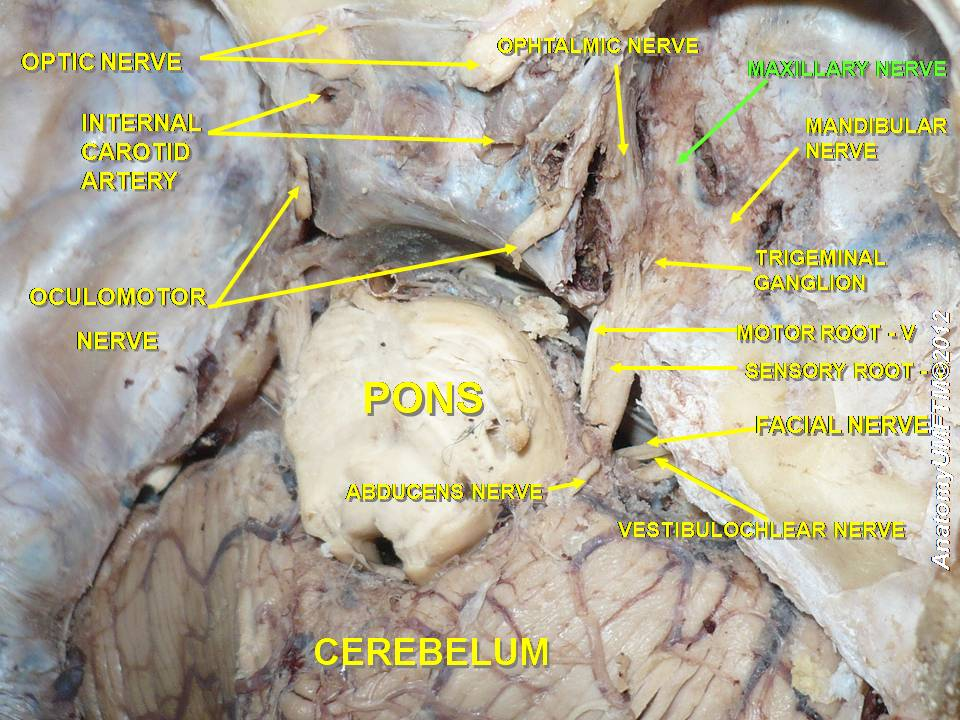
Maxillary nerve

== See also ==
- Trigeminal nerve
- Cranial nerves
- Alveolar nerve (Dental nerve)
