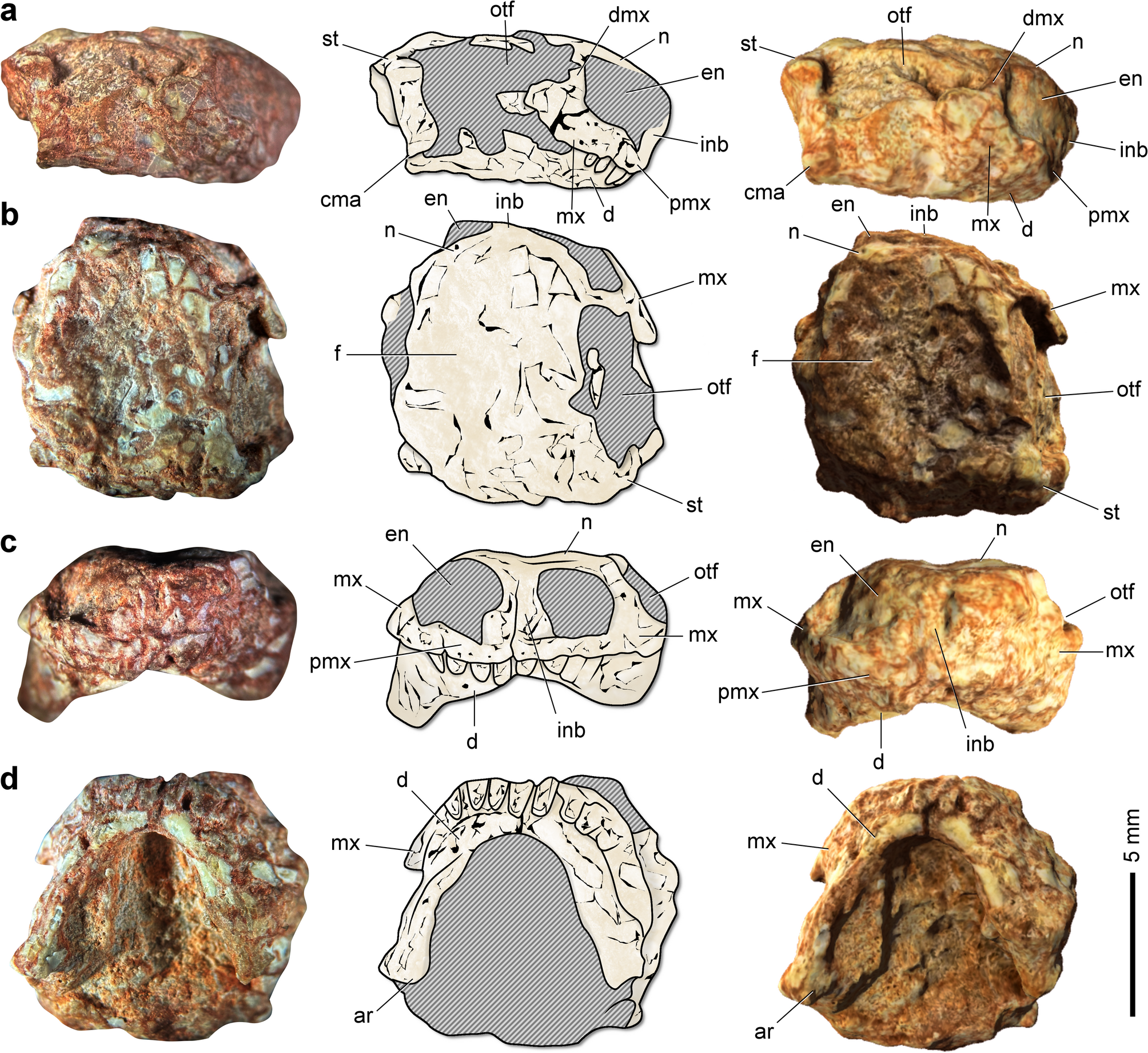
- Holotype skull in multiple views

Scientific classification
- Kingdom: Animalia
- Phylum: Chordata
- Class: Reptilia
- Family: †Procolophonidae (?)
- Genus: †Sauropia; Müller et al., 2026
- Species: †S. macrorhinus

Binomial name
- †Sauropia macrorhinus Müller et al., 2026

= Sauropia =

Sauropia Temporal range: Middle Triassic, Ladinian

Genus of procolophonoid reptile

Sauropia is an extinct genus of procolophonoid stem-reptile known from the Middle Triassic (Ladinian age) Santa Maria Formation of Brazil. The genus contains a single species, Sauropia macrorhinus, known from a very small skull and mandible. It may belong to the family Procolophonidae, but the immature nature of the only known specimen makes this identity uncertain.

== Discovery and naming ==
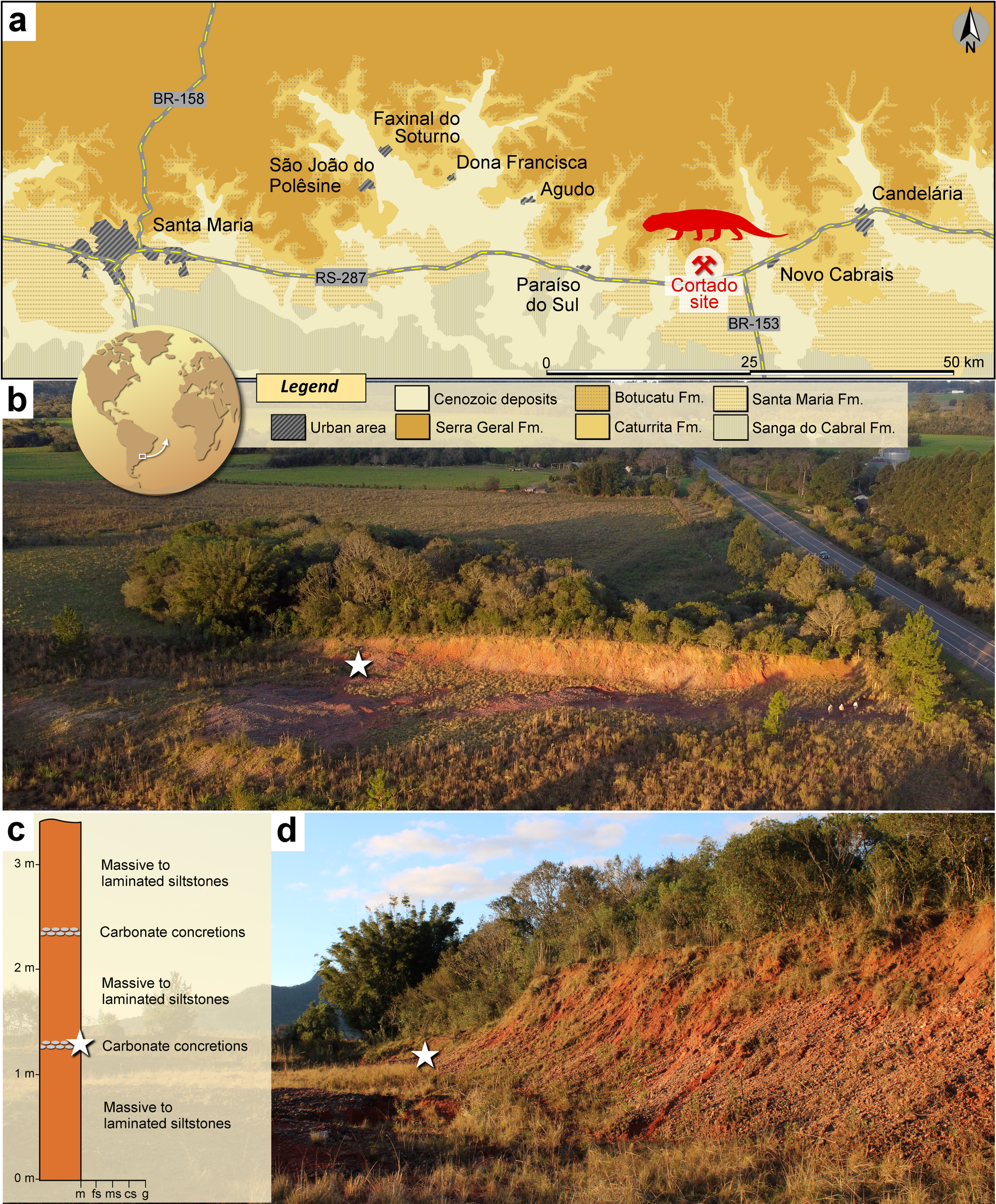
Type locality and geologic context of the S. macrorhinus holotype

The Sauropia fossil material was discovered at the 'Cortado site', representing outcrops of the Santa Maria Formation, (Pinheiros-Chiniquá Sequence, Santa Maria Supersequence) in Novo Cabrais of Rio Grande do Sul, Brazil. This locality is part of the Dinodontosaurus Assemblage Zone (AZ). The specimen, comprising nearly all of a skull, articulated with the mandible, is housed in the Centro de Apoio à Pesquisa Paleontológica, part of the Federal University of Santa Maria, where it is permanently accessioned as specimen CAPPA/UFSM 0510.

In 2026, Rodrigo T. Müller and colleagues described Sauropia macrorhinus as a new genus and species of procolophonoid 'parareptile' based on these fossil remains, establishing CAPPA/UFSM 0510 as the holotype specimen. The generic name, Sauropia, combines the Ancient Greek σαῦρος (sauros), meaning 'lizard', with the Portuguese word piá, referring to a child or young boy. This word is particularly prevalent in Gaúcho culture in the region where the holotype was found, and was chosen in reference to the likely early ontogenetic stage and especially small size of this specimen. The specific name, macrorhinus, combines the Greek word makros, meaning 'large', and rhinos, meaning 'snout' or 'nose', alluding to the large external nares of the known skull.

== Description ==
The holotype skull of S. macrorhinus is 9.5 millimetres (0.37 in) long. The skull is almost as wide as it is long, with a maximum width at the temporal region of 8.7 mm (0.34 in). As such, it is the smallest tetrapod skull known from the Middle Triassic of South America. Besides this very small size, there are no immediately apparent indicators of the specimen's ontogenetic status (age). Müller and colleagues (2026) suggested that, since all other procolophonoids have skulls at least 2.5 times longer, this strongly supports an immature status for the specimen. Like many fossils from the Dinodontosaurus AZ, much of the specimen is covered in mineral concretions, with the external bone surface poorly preserved. As such, much of the anatomy and details of CAPPA/UFSM 0510 are obscured. This is exacerbated by the specimen's tiny size.

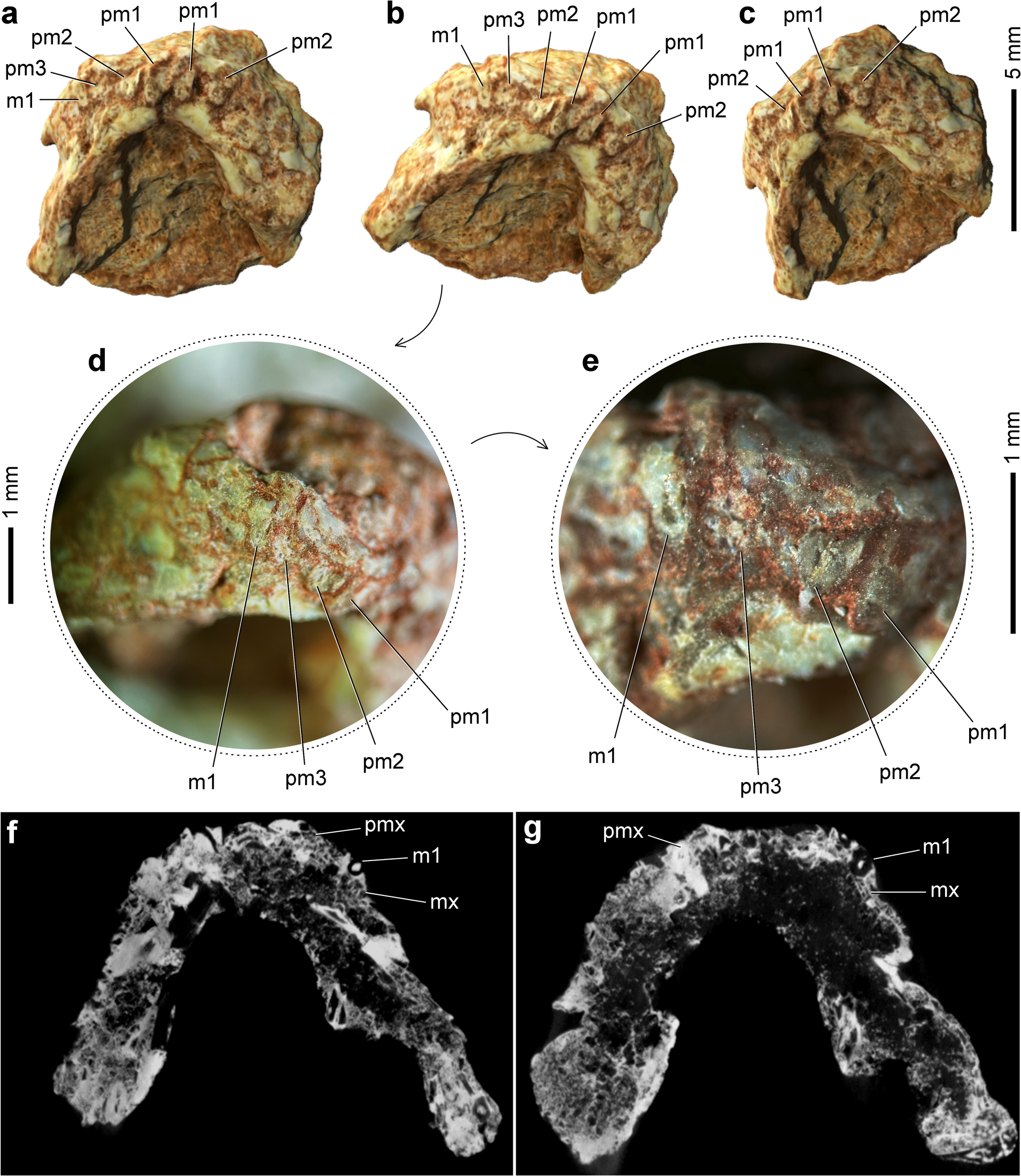
Details of the dentition of Sauropia

The holotype skull of Sauropia exhibits a unique combination of anatomical traits seen in either owenettids or procolophonids (the two distinct lineages within Procolophonoidea). When seen from above, the snout of the specimen is broad and rounded. This region comprises a comparatively short and deep part of the skull. These proportions are only seen in some procolophonids, and not in owenettids, as the latter are characterized by a longer, flatter snout. However, it is possible that snout shape is ontogenetically variable (changes through age) in procolophonoids, but the effects of ontogeny on skull architecture in these taxa are not well understood. The external nares ('nostril hole' in the skull) are especially wide and tall. When seen from the side, the external naris is elongated, similar to owenettids and basal procolophonoids, but different from procolophonids, in which it is generally more circular. The internarial bar of the premaxilla (upward-projecting part between the external nares, forming the front border of the snout) is directed anterodorsally (forward and upward), an exclusively procolophonid feature. The orbitotemporal fenestra ('eye hole' in the skull) is similarly elongate, with the rear margin almost reaching the posterior part of the skull. In owenettids, the orbit is anteroposteriorly shorter (shorter from front to back). The greatly expanded form of this fenestra may be due to its immaturity, with it becoming proportionately smaller through development.

There are three tooth positions in the premaxilla, similar to some procolophonids and in contrast to owenettids, which have at least five. These teeth in Sauropia are straight, cylindrical in cross-section, and lacking cusps. The front tip of the premaxilla projects downward. The maxilla is incomplete, missing the rear portion. The number of maxillary teeth is unclear, as only one tooth is preserved in the right maxilla. The lower part of the maxilla that contacts the premaxilla (subnarial process) is relatively long, similar to owenettids and Coletta (one of the basalmost procolophonids), but distinct from other procolophonids. The bones of the skull roof are poorly preserved and difficult to distinguish, but it likely had particularly wide frontals, a distinctive feature not seen in other procolophonoids (possibly due to the individual's young age). The mandible is generally horseshoe-shaped. Its dentition is not visible.

== Classification ==
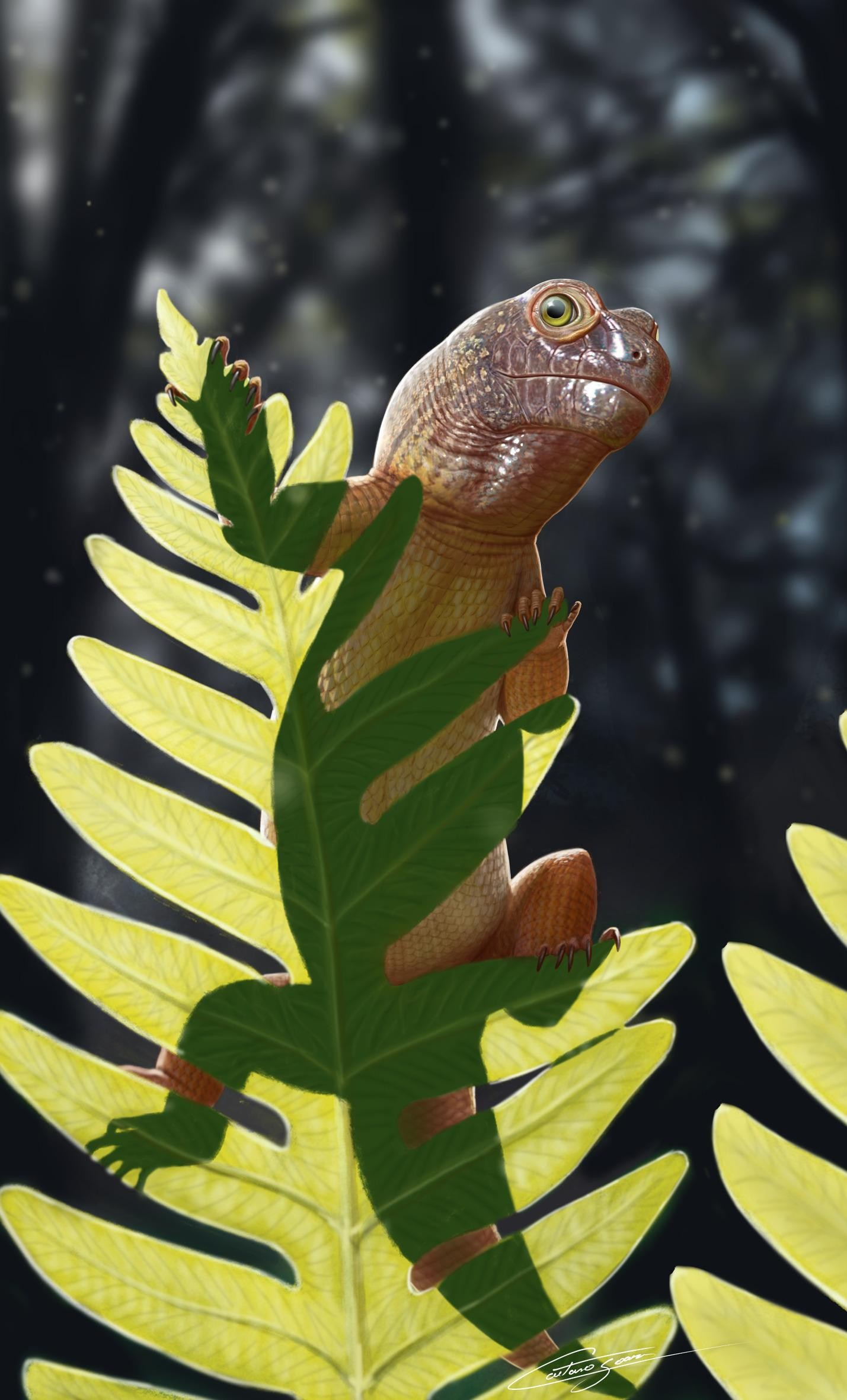
Speculative life restoration of Sauropia on a leaf

To assess the relationships of Sauropia within the Procolophonoidea, Müller and colleagues included it in an updated version of the phylogenetic matrix of Mueller et al. (2023). This analysis placed Sauropia within the family Procolophonidae, in a large uresolved polytomy with several other early-diverging taxa, one of which, Oryporan, is also from the Triassic of Brazil. These results are displayed in the cladogram below. Müller et al. cautioned that this placement for Sauropia should be regarded as tentative, due to the likely early ontogenetic stage of the holotype specimen and presence of some owenettid traits.

- †Procolophonoidea
  - Owenettidae
    ⊞
    - Barasaurus besairiei
    - Candelaria barbouri
    - Owenetta rubidgei
    - Ruhuhuaria reiszi
    - Saurodektes kitchingorum
    ⊟
  - Procolophonidae
    - Coletta seca
    - - - Kitchingnathus untabeni
        - Lasasaurus beltanae
      - - Sauropareion anoplus
        - - Pintosaurus magnidentis
          - - Eomurruna yurrgensis
            - Oryporan insolitus
            - Phaanthosaurus ignatjevi
            - Phonodus dutoitorum
            - Procolina teresae
            - Sauropia macrorhinus
            - Theledectes perforatus
            - Youngetta dongshengensis
            - - Timanophon raridentatus
              - - Tichvinskia vjatkensis
                - - Eumetabolodon bathycephalus
                  - Procolophoninae
                    ⊞
                    - Procolophon trigoniceps
                    - Teratophon spinigenis
                    - Thelerpeton oppressus
                    ⊟
                  - Leptopleuroninae
                    ⊞
                    - Pentaedrusaurus ordosianus
                    - - - "Kapes" bentoni
                        - - Anomoiodon liliensterni
                          - - Kapes majmesculae
                            - Thelephon contritus
                      - - Neoprocolophon asiaticus
                        - - Cornualbus primus
                          - - Mandaphon nadra
                            - - - Sclerosaurus armatus
                                - Scoloparia glyphanodon
                              - - Leptopleuron lacertinum
                                - - Soturnia caliodon
                                  - - Hwiccewyrm trispiculum
                                    - - Hypsognathus fenneri
                                      - - Libognathus sheddi
                                        - 'Abajo form' (MNA V9953)
                                        - 'Glen's Ferry form'
                    ⊟
