= Pentacolophon =

Pentacolophon Temporal range: Early Triassic

Scientific classification
- Kingdom: Animalia
- Phylum: Chordata
- Class: Reptilia
- Superfamily: †Procolophonoidea
- Family: †Procolophonidae
- Genus: †Pentacolophon; Pinheiro et al., 2026
- Species: †P. winterbergensis

Binomial name
- †Pentacolophon winterbergensis Pinheiro et al., 2026

Genus of procolophonid reptile

Pentacolophon is an extinct genus of procolophonoid stem-reptile known from the Early Triassic lower–middle Katberg Formation of South Africa. The genus contains a single species, Pentacolophon winterbergensis, known from a partial skeleton including a nearly complete skull.

== Discovery and naming ==
P. winterbergensis type locality in Bedford, South Africa

The Pentacolophon fossil material was discovered on May 14, 2014, by Derik Wolvaardt in outcrops of the lower–middle Katberg Formation exposed along a road between Bedford and Tarkastad, South Africa. This site is located on Upper Clifton Farm in the Baviaansrivier Valley of the Winterberg mountain range. This formation is associated with the Lystrosaurus declivis Assemblage Zone. The specimen is housed in the Iziko South African Museum in Cape Town, where it is permanently accessioned as specimen SAM-PK-K11292. It consists of a nearly complete skull and mandible preserved in partial articulation with an incomplete postcrania skeleton, including a series of articulated cervical (neck) vertebrae with cervical ribs, part of the left forelimb, most of the left hindlimb, several ribs, and some elements of the pectoral and pelvic girdles.

In 2026, Felipe L. Pinheiro and colleagues described Pentacolophon winterbergensis as a new genus and species of procolophonid based on these fossil remains, designating SAM-PK-K11292 as the holotype specimen. The generic name, Pentacolophon, combines the Greek prefix penta- (five) with the Greek κολοφών (kolophṓn), meaning 'summit', alluding to the five-pointed shape of the skull when viewed from above, as well as its affinities with the Procolophonidae. The specific name, winterbergensis, references the discovery of the holotype in the Winterberg Mountains.

The discovery of the P. winterbergensis holotype is stratigraphically significant within the Katberg Formation. As it derives from the middle strata of the formation, it fills a previously recognized procolophonid gap between isolated occurrences of Coletta and Sauropareion from the lower part of the formation and Kitchingnathus from the upper part. Procolophon is known from many fossils, the only procolophonid spanning the formation's full temporal duration.

== Description ==
Pinheiro and colleagues (2026) described the P. winterbergensis holotype as belonging to a "diminutive" procolophonid. The skull, which is pentagonal in dorsal view, with the rear portion being expanded before narrowing toward the acutely angled rostrum. Erosion and cracks on the skull make it difficult to distinguish sutures between specific cranial bones. The external nares ('nose hole' in the skull) are longer than tall, a feature comparable to owenettids (the sister group to Procolophonidae). Other procolophonids have sub-circular external nares or nares taller than long, making the condition in Pentacolophon autapomorphic (unique) within this clade. Temporal fenestration seems to be absent. The lateral surfaces of the maxillae (upper tooth-bearing bones) exhibit at least four large foramina. The upper jaw bears eleven teeth, best observable via micro-CT scans: three in the premaxilla and eight in the maxilla. The mandible is complete, preserved in occlusion with the skull. Its overall structure is very robust, though the tooth-bearing dentaries become more slender anteriorly (toward the front). This is similar to owenettids but distinct from most procolophonids, which have dentaries that deepen anteriorly. The dentary bears ten teeth, which are inset in relation to those of the upper jaw. The anterior teeth in both the upper and lower jaws are conical, with their crowns curving inwards. Those in the upper jaw are more prominent. The posterior (toward the rear) teeth are significantly more robust. Six palatal teeth are visible through the CT scan data, likely belonging to the vomers and palatines.

A bone preserved near the scapula is likely the cleithrum, representing the third known record of this bone in a procolophonid.

== Classification ==
To test the affinities of Pentacolophon, Pinheiro et al. (2026) included it in an updated version of the phylogenetic matrix of Meade et al. (2024), the latest of several iterations of a dataset focused on procolophonoid relationships. In their parsimony analyses, Pentacolophon was recovered in a large unresolved polytomy of basal procolophonids. Using a tip-dated Bayesian analysis (the first such instance published for procolophonids), relationships were substantially better-resolved, albeit with lower node support. Here, Pentacolophon was recovered as the sister taxon to the coeval Phonodus, diverging before the Theledectinae. These results are displayed in the cladogram below:

- †Procolophonidae
  - - Coletta
    - - Pintosaurus
      - Sauropareion
  - - - Phaanthosaurus
      - - Kitchingnathus
        - - Lasasaurus
          - Oryporan
    - - - Pentacolophon
        - Phonodus
      - - Theledectinae
        - - Timanophon
          - - Tichvinskia
            - - - Anomoiodon
                - - Thelephon
                  - Kapes majmesculae
              - - Leptopleuroninae
                - Procolophoninae

== See also ==
- Karoo Supergroup
