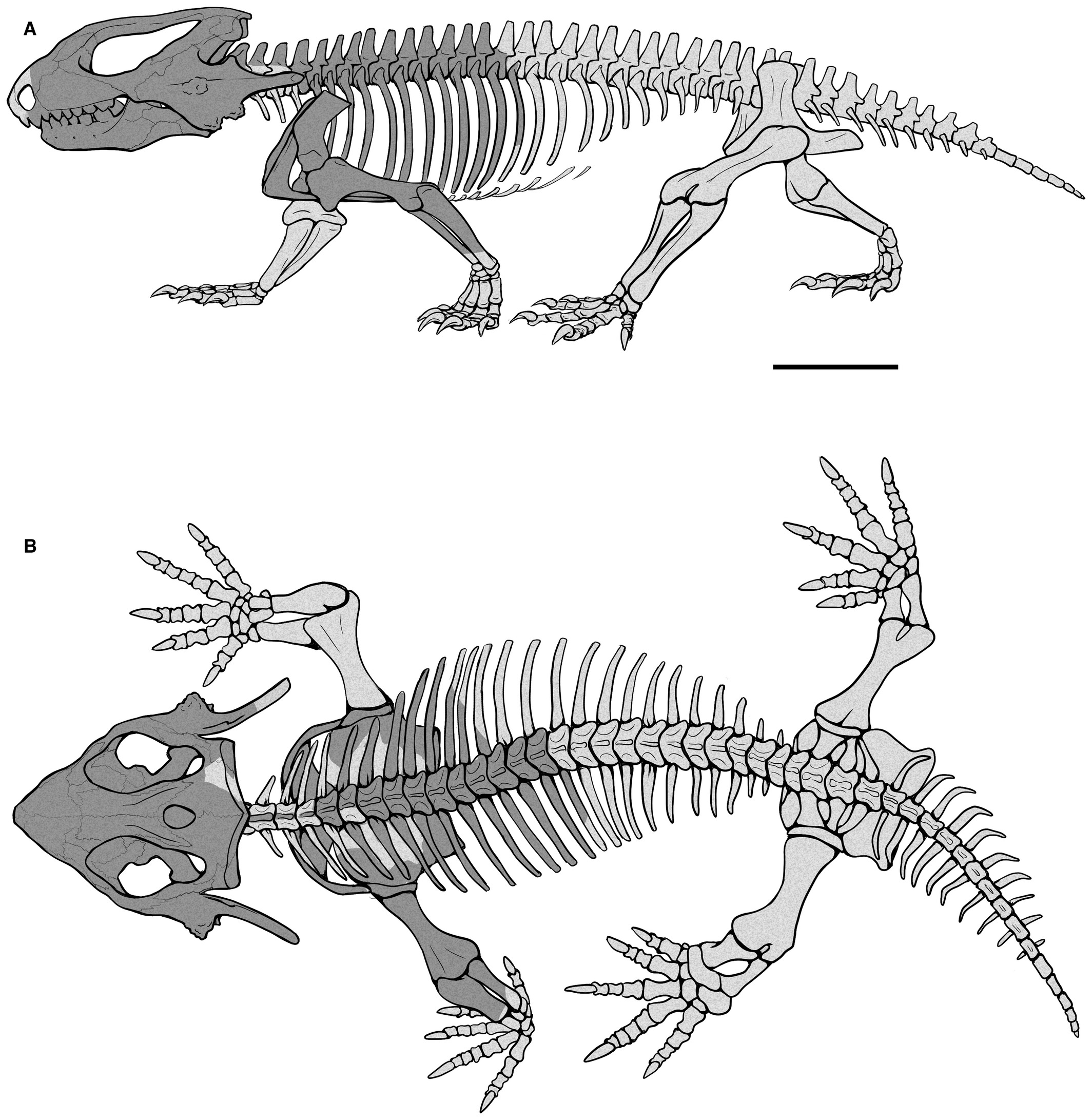
- Skeleton of Kapes bentoni

Scientific classification
- Kingdom: Animalia
- Phylum: Chordata
- Class: Reptilia
- Family: †Procolophonidae
- Subfamily: †Procolophoninae
- Genus: †Kapes; Ivakhnenko, 1975

Species
- †K. amaenus Ivakhnenko, 1975 (type); †K. komiensis Ivakhnenko, 1975 [originally Macrophon komiensis]; †K. majmesculae Ochev, 1968 [originally Tichvinskia majmesculae]; †K. bentoni Spencer and Storrs, 2002; †K. signus Riccetto et al., 2025

= Kapes (reptile) =

Kapes Temporal range: Lower - Middle Triassic 252–237 Ma

Extinct genus of reptiles

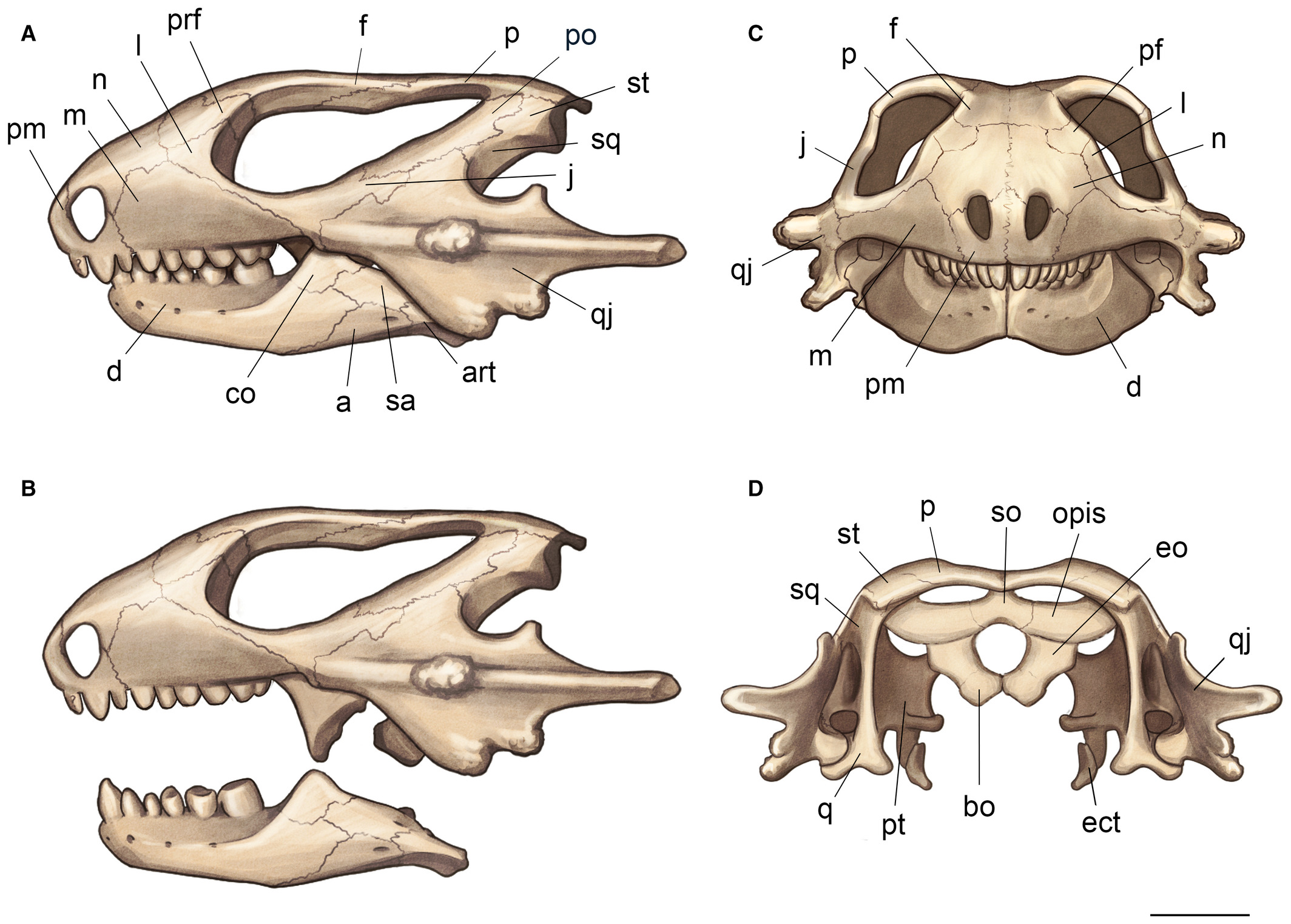
Skull of Kapes bentoni

Kapes is an extinct genus of procolophonid parareptile from the Lower and Middle Triassic of Russia, Spain and the United Kingdom. The type species K. amaenus was named in 1975 from the banks of the Vychegda River in the Komi Republic of Russia. In 1983, a new species was brought into the genus, K. majmesculae. K. majmesculae was first named in 1968 as a member of the genus Tichvinskia. A third Russian species, K. serotinus, was named in 1991. In 2002, Kapes bentoni was described from the Middle Triassic Otter Sandstone Formation of Devon, England, extending the geographic range of Kapes. In the same paper, K. serotinus was synonymized with K. majmesculae and another Russian species was assigned to Kapes called K. komiensis. K. komiensis was first named in 1975 (in the same paper K. amaenus was named in) as a member of the genus Macrophon. In 2025, Kapes signus was described from the Middle Triassic of Catalonia, Spain.

== Description ==
The validity of the genus is based mainly on dental characteristics. On the upper jaw there are four to five molariforms, one of which, placed middle, is mesial. A very large tooth located on the lower jaw. First four molariforms enlarge towards the posterior ends of the upper and lower jaws. Labial and lingual cusps on the lower teeth are almost the same height and located close to each other. Kapes differs from Tichvinskia by being larger and the number and shape of the teeth.

== Phylogeny ==
It was defined as a member of the subfamily Procolophoninae by Cisneros et al. (2008). Below is a cladogram from Ruta et al. (2011) showing the placement of Kapes within this subfamily:

- Procolophonidae
  - Coletta seca
  - Pintosaurus magnidentis
  - Sauropareion anoplus
  - Kitchingnathus untabeni
  - - Phaanthosaurus ignatjevi
    - Phaanthosaurus simus
  - - Theledectinae
      - Eumetabolodon dongshengensis
      - Theledectes perforatus
    - - Tichvinskia vjatkensis
      - - Leptopleuroninae
          - Pentaedrusaurus ordosianus
          - - Neoprocolophon asiaticus
            - - - Sclerosaurus armatus
                - Scoloparia glyphanodon
              - - Leptopleuron lacertinum
                - - Soturnia caliodon
                  - Hypsognathus fenneri
        - Procolophoninae
          - - Eumetabolodon bathycephalus
            - - Procolophon trigoniceps
              - Teratophon spinigenis
              - Thelerpeton oppressus
          - - Timanophon raridentatus
            - - Thelephon contritus
              - - Anomoiodon liliensterni
                - Kapes
                  - Kapes amaenus
                  - Kapes bentoni
                  - Kapes komiensis
                  - Kapes majmesculae

In their phylogenetic analyses, Butler et al. (2023) placed two Kapes species, K. bentoni and K. majmesculae, in Leptopleuroninae or in Procolophonidae, outside of both Leptopleuroninae and Procolophoninae.
