= Kitchingnathus =

Kitchingnathus Temporal range: Early Triassic, Olenekian

Scientific classification
- Kingdom: Animalia
- Phylum: Chordata
- Class: Reptilia
- Subclass: †Parareptilia
- Order: †Procolophonomorpha
- Family: †Procolophonidae
- Genus: †Kitchingnathus; Cisneros, 2008

Species
- †K. untabeni Cisneros, 2008 (type)

Extinct genus of reptiles

Kitchingnathus (Kitchings' mandible) is an extinct genus of basal procolophonid parareptile from Early Triassic (early Olenekian stage) deposits of Eastern Cape Province, South Africa. It is known from the holotype BP/1/1187, skull and partial postcranium, which was first assigned to the more derived Procolophon trigoniceps. It was collected by the South African palaeontologist, James W. Kitching in October 1952 from Hobbs Hill, west of Cathcart. It was found in the middle or upper part of the Katberg Formation of the Beaufort Group (Karoo Basin) and referred to the uppermost Lystrosaurus Assemblage Zone. It was first named by Juan Carlos Cisneros in 2008 and the type species is Kitchingnathus untabeni. The generic name honours James W. Kitching, and "gnathus", from Greek gnathos meaning mandible. The specific name meaning "from the hill", in isiZulu, is in reference to the locality where the fossil was found.

== Phylogeny ==
Cladogram after Cisneros, 2008:

- Procolophonidae
  - - Coletta
    - Sauropareion
  - - Kitchingnathus
    - - Phaanthosaurus
      - - Theledectinae
          - "Eumetabolodon" dongshengensis
          - Theledectes
        - - Tichvinskia
          - - Procolophoninae
            - Leptopleuroninae
