= Cynognathus Assemblage Zone =

Triassic biozone in South Africa

- Stratigraphic range: Early-Mid Triassic; ~249–244 Ma
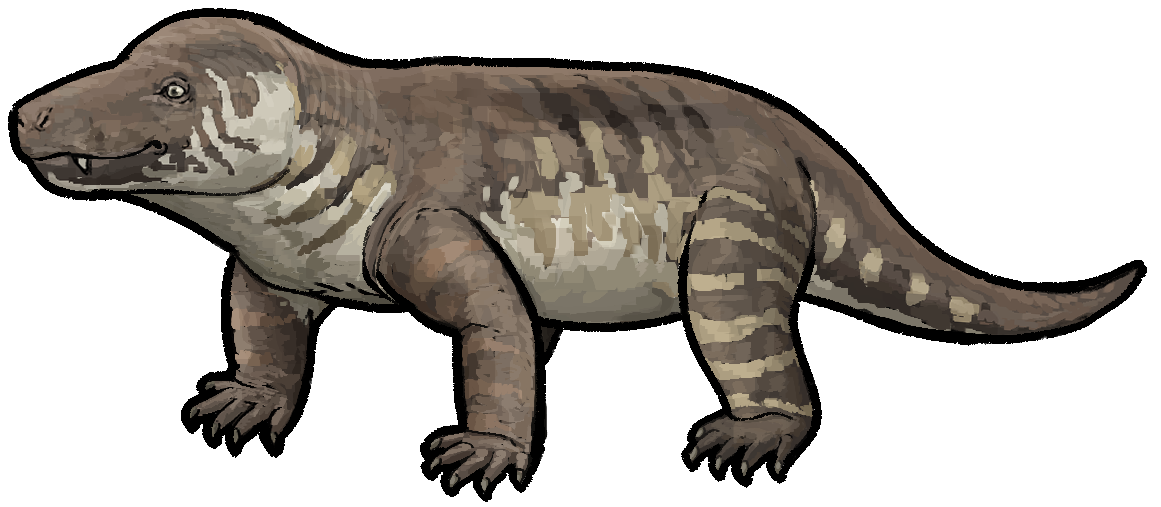
- Cynognathus crateronotus
- Type: Biozone
- Unit of: Burgersdorp Formation (Beaufort Group)
- Underlies: Molteno Formation (Stormberg Group)
- Overlies: Lystrosaurus declivis Assemblage Zone
- Thickness: up to 1,968.5 feet (600 m)

Location
- Region: Eastern Cape, Free State
- Country: South Africa
- Extent: Karoo Basin

Type section
- Named for: Cynognathus
- Named by: Harry Govier Seeley (1892); Robert Broom (1906, 1909)

The Cynognathus Assemblage Zone is a tetrapod biozone utilized in the Karoo Basin of South Africa. It is equivalent to the Burgersdorp Formation, the youngest lithostratigraphic formation in the Beaufort Group, which is part of the fossiliferous and geologically important Karoo Supergroup. The Cynognathus Assemblage Zone is the youngest of the eight biozones found in the Beaufort Group, and is considered to be late Early Triassic (Olenekian) to early Middle Triassic (Anisian) in age (around 247 Ma). The name of the biozone refers to Cynognathus crateronotus, a large and carnivorous cynodont therapsid which occurs throughout the entire biozone.

== History ==
The first fossils to be found in the Beaufort Group rocks that encompass the current eight biozones were discovered by Andrew Geddes Bain in 1856. However, it was not until 1892 that it was observed that the geological strata of the Beaufort Group could be differentiated based on their fossil taxa. The initial undertaking was done by Harry Govier Seeley who subdivided the Beaufort Group into three biozones, which he named (from oldest to youngest):

- Zone of "Pareiasaurians"
- Zone of "Dicynodonts"
- Zone of "highly specialized group of theriodonts"

Under Seeley's system, the "highly specialized theriodonts" zone corresponds to the modern Cynognathus Assemblage Zone. Seeley's proposed biozones were subdivided further by Robert Broom between 1906 and 1909. Broom proposed the following biozones (from oldest to youngest):

- Pareiasaurus beds
- Endothiodon beds
- Kistecephalus beds
- Lystrosaurus beds
- Procolophon beds
- Cynognathus beds

These biozone divisions were approved by paleontologists of the time and were left largely unchanged for several decades. James Kitching retained the name of the Cynognathus zone in his revision of the biozones in the 1970s and 1980s. In 1995, he formalized the biozone under the name "Cynognathus Assemblage Zone".

In the mid-1990s, new discoveries of additional outcrops presented the possibility that the Cynognathus Assemblage Zone could be subdivided further. A 1995 paper split it into three subzones: a lower subzone characterized by Kestrosaurus, a middle subzone characterized by the "classic" zone fauna which was already well-established, and an upper zone with reduced diversity. This informal three-part subdivision scheme was later labelled with letters (as subzones A, B, and C from oldest to youngest) until it was formalized with robust index taxa and type sections in 2020. Subzone A was formalized as the Langbergia-Garjainia Subzone, subzone B as the Trirachodon-Kannemeyeria Subzone, and subzone C as the Cricodon-Ufudocyclops Subzone.

From the late 1970s onwards, some authors argued that Cynognathus was less common than previously considered, so they instead renamed the biozone to the Kannemeyeria Assemblage Zone or Kannemeyeria-Diademodon Assemblage Zone. However, later work found that Kannemeyeria fossils were absent from Subzone A, and while Diademodon was found throughout the biozone it had been usurped as a dominant taxon by larger trirachodontids by Subzone C. This meant that these species were not ideal index taxa for the biozone. As Cynognathus fossils are found consistently throughout, the current name for the biozone was retained.

== Lithology ==
The Cynognathus Assemblage Zone correlates with the Burgersdorp Formation in the upper Tarkastad Subgroup of the Beaufort Group. The Cynognathus Assemblage Zone contains argillaceous mudstone successions varying from maroon to reddish, blueish-green, and greyish-green in colour. The mudstones are interbedded with lenticular and feldspathic sandstones which appear greenish-grey when fresh and brownish-yellow when eroded out. Clay-rich pebble conglomerates are also observed in some areas. Complete, articulated fossils are frequently found encased in calcareous nodules within the mudstone layers while complete skulls are mainly found in the sandstone. The mudstones were likely deposited in low-energy, meandering fluvial environments alongside sand-rich river channels. The environment during time of deposition was semi-arid, but with seasonal rain and flooding due to the presence of crevasse splays in the mudstone layers. A lack of well developed channel sandstones provides evidence for more lacustrine areas in the more northerly occurring outcrops of the biozone.

The thickest outcrops of the Cynognathus Assemblage Zone, reaching approximately 600 metres (2,000 ft), occur between Queenstown and Lady Frere in the Eastern Cape. Outcrops then thin out to between 200 and 100 metres (660 and 330 ft) around Aliwal North, Burgersdorp, Steynsburg, and Rouxville. Thin outcrops are also found in areas in the Free State that border Lesotho.

The Langbergia-Garjainia Subzone (Subzone A) is most well-exposed and fossiliferous in northeast Free State, between Senekal and Bethlehem. At the stratotype near Bethlehem, it reaches around 50 m in thickness. Exposures of this subzone rapidly decrease to the east, disappearing around Bergville. Although the subzone thickens further south (to up to 100 m) towards Aliwal North, fossils diminish in abundance. Sediments of Subzone A are likely present in the Eastern Cape, though a lack of sufficient fossil material prevents it from being distinguished from younger strata.

The Trirachodon-Kannemeyeria Subzone (Subzone B) is the thickest and historically the most well-studied portion of the Assemblage Zone. It is primarily exposed in the Eastern Cape south of Lesotho. Subzone B reaches up to 500 m thick at the stratotype between Queenstown and Lady Frere, thinning northwards until it disappears east of Thaba 'Nchu. The Cricodon-Ufudocyclops Subzone (Subzone C) has limited exposures in the vicinity of Molteno and Sterkstroom in the Eastern Cape. It reaches up to 150 m at its stratotype in Sterkstroom.

== Biostratigraphy ==
The Cynognathus Assemblage Zone holds a rich diversity of fossil species, of which it is most renowned for its cynodont fossils. Cynognathids, diademodontids, and trirachodontids are found throughout the Assemblage Zone. In Subzone B, the diademodontid Diademodon is far more common than trirachodontids. However, by the contact with Subzone C, trirachodontids had become the dominant taxa. Cynognathus is the common denominator, with its fossils found throughout Subzones A – C, confirming its place as the index taxon of the biozone as a whole. The large dicynodont Kannemeyeria simocephalus appears in Subzone B alongside other anomodonts, and therocephalian species can be found throughout the biozone. Apart from synapsids, the biozone is rich in other fossil fauna, including procolophonid parareptiles and archosauromorph reptiles. Plant fossils such as Dicroidium, Dadoxylon, and Schizoneura have been uncovered from limited areas corresponding to Subzones B - C. Aquatic life is well represented: numerous species of temnospondyl amphibian, fishes, rare occurrences of molluscs, and ichnofossils of arthropod trackways and vertebrate burrows have been discovered.

=== Subzone A ===
The Langbergia-Garjainia Subzone (Subzone A) is the oldest subzone in the Cynognathus Assemblage Zone. Its base is defined by the first appearance of Cynognathus crateronotus, as well as the trirachodontid cynodont Langbergia modisei and the erythrosuchid archosauriform Garjainia madiba. The temnospondyl amphibians Kestrosaurus and Parotosuchus haughtoni are also common and distinctive fossils of the Langbergia-Garjainia Subzone. Dicynodonts are absent, unlike every other zone and subzone in the Beaufort Group.

=== Subzone B ===
The Trirachodon-Kannemeyeria Subzone (Subzone B) corresponds to traditional conceptions of the Cynognathus Assemblage Zone. Alongside abundant fossils of Cynognathus crateronotus, the base of Subzone B sees the first appearance of fellow cynodonts Diademodon tetragonus and Trirachodon berryi. Dicynodonts reappear with Kannemeyeria simocephalus, while Xenotosuchus africanus is the most common temnospondyl in this subzone. The Trirachodon-Kannemeyeria Subzone also has the highest diversity of fish, plants, and archosauromorph reptiles in the entire Assemblage Zone. The erythrosuchid Erythrosuchus africanus is a common component of the fauna, living alongside its smaller relative Euparkeria capensis and several species of early rhynchosaurs (Howesia browni, Eohyosaurus wolvaardti, Mesosuchus browni).

=== Subzone C ===
The Cricodon-Ufudocyclops Subzone (Subzone C) is the youngest subzone, and has the most restricted exposures and fossil content. Its base is defined by the first appearance of the trirachodontid Cricodon metabolus and the dicynodont Ufudocyclops mukanelai, the only species which are common in this subzone. Cynognathus and Diademodon still persist, though they are far more rare than in the previous subzone. Other species with utility for correlation include the temnospondyl Paracyclotosaurus morganorum and the dicynodont Shansiodon sp., which co-occur in the lower part of the subzone.

== Paleobiota ==
Color key: Taxon / Reclassified taxon / Taxon falsely reported as present / Dubious taxon or junior synonym / Ichnotaxon / Ootaxon / Morphotaxon	Notes; Uncertain or tentative taxa are in small text; ~~crossed out~~ taxa are discredited.

=== Temnospondyls ===
Temnospondyls of the Burgersdorp Formation
Genus / Taxon	Species	Subzone	Notes	Image
Bathignathus	B. poikilops	Langbergia-Garjainia Subzone (A)	A brachyopid	
Batrachosuchus	B. browni	Trirachodon-Kannemeyeria Subzone (B)	A brachyopid	
Jammerbergia	J. formops	Trirachodon-Kannemeyeria Subzone (B)	A mastodonsaurid	
Kestrosaurus	K. dreyeri	Langbergia-Garjainia Subzone (A)	A mastodonsaurid	
Kestrosaurus	K. kitchingi	Langbergia-Garjainia Subzone (A)	A mastodonsaurid	
Laidleria	L. gracilis	Trirachodon-Kannemeyeria Subzone (B)	A laidleriid	
Microposaurus	M. casei	Trirachodon-Kannemeyeria Subzone (B)	A trematosaurid	
Paracyclotosaurus	P. morganorum	Cricodon-Ufudocyclops Subzone (C)	A mastodonsaurid	
Parotosuchus	P. haughtoni	Langbergia-Garjainia Subzone (A)	A mastodonsaurid	
Trematosuchus	T. sobeyi	Langbergia-Garjainia Subzone (A)	A trematosaurid	
Vanastega	V. plurimidens	Trirachodon-Kannemeyeria Subzone (B)	A brachyopid	
Xenotosuchus	X. africanus	Trirachodon-Kannemeyeria Subzone (B)	A mastodonsaurid	

=== Synapsids ===
==== Cynodonts ====
Cynodonts of the Burgersdorp Formation
Genus	Species	Subzone	Notes	Image
Bolotridon	B. frerensis	Trirachodon-Kannemeyeria Subzone (B)	An epicynodontian cynodont	
Cricodon	C. kannemeyeri	Trirachodon-Kannemeyeria Subzone (B)	A trirachodontid cynodont	
Cricodon	C. metabolus	Cricodon-Ufudocyclops Subzone (C)	A trirachodontid cynodont	
Cynognathus	C. crateronotus	Langbergia-Garjainia Subzone (A), Trirachodon-Kannemeyeria Subzone (B), Cricodon-Ufudocyclops Subzone (C)	A basal cynognathian cynodont	
Diademodon	D. tetragonus	Trirachodon-Kannemeyeria Subzone (B), Cricodon-Ufudocyclops Subzone (C)	A diademodontid cynodont	
Guttigomphus	G. avilionis	Cricodon-Ufudocyclops Subzone (C)	A trirachodontid cynodont	
Impidens	I. hancoxi	Cricodon-Ufudocyclops Subzone (C)	A trirachodontid cynodont	
Langbergia	L. modisei	Langbergia-Garjainia Subzone (A)	A trirachodontid cynodont	
Lumkuia	L. fuzzi	Trirachodon-Kannemeyeria Subzone (B)	A eucynodontian cynodont	

==== Dicynodonts ====
Dicynodonts of the Burgersdorp Formation
Genus	Species	Subzone	Notes	Image
Kannemeyeria	K. simocephalus	Trirachodon-Kannemeyeria Subzone (B)	A kannemeyeriiform dicynodont	
Kombuisia	K. frerensis	Trirachodon-Kannemeyeria Subzone (B)	A kingoriid dicynodont	
Shansiodon	S. sp.	Cricodon-Ufudocyclops Subzone (C)	A shansiodontid dicynodont	
Ufudocyclops	U. mukanelai	Cricodon-Ufudocyclops Subzone (C)	A stahleckeriid dicynodont	

==== Therocephalian ====
Therocephalians of the Burgersdorp Formation
Genus	Species	Subzone	Notes	Image
Bauria	B. cynops	Trirachodon-Kannemeyeria Subzone (B)	A bauriid therocephalian	
Microgomphodon	M. oligocynus	Langbergia-Garjainia Subzone (A), Trirachodon-Kannemeyeria Subzone (B)	A bauriid therocephalian	

=== Reptiles ===
Reptiles of the Burgersdorp Formation
Genus / Taxon	Species	Subzone	Notes	Image
Eohyosaurus	E. wolvaardti	Trirachodon-Kannemeyeria Subzone (B)	A basal rhynchosaur	
Erythrosuchus	E. africanus	Trirachodon-Kannemeyeria Subzone (B)	An erythrosuchid archosauriform	
Euparkeria	E. capensis	Trirachodon-Kannemeyeria Subzone (B)	A euparkeriid archosauriform	
Garjainia	G. madiba	Langbergia-Garjainia Subzone (A)	An erythrosuchid archosauriform	
Howesia	H. browni	Trirachodon-Kannemeyeria Subzone (B)	A basal rhynchosaur	
Mesosuchus	M. browni	Trirachodon-Kannemeyeria Subzone (B)	A basal rhynchosaur	
Myocephalus	M. crassidens	Trirachodon-Kannemeyeria Subzone (B)	A procolophonid parareptile	
Palacrodon	P. browni	Langbergia-Garjainia Subzone (A), Trirachodon-Kannemeyeria Subzone (B)	An indeterminate diapsid	
Procolophonidae	indet.	Langbergia-Garjainia Subzone (A)	Indeterminate procolophonid parareptiles	
Teratophon	T. spinigenis	Trirachodon-Kannemeyeria Subzone (B)	A procolophonine procolophonid parareptile	
Theledectes	T. perforates	Trirachodon-Kannemeyeria Subzone (B)	A theledectine procolophonid parareptile	
Thelephon	T. contritus	Trirachodon-Kannemeyeria Subzone (B)	A procolophonine procolophonid parareptile	
Thelerpeton	T. oppressus	Trirachodon-Kannemeyeria Subzone (B)	A procolophonine procolophonid parareptile	

== Age and correlations ==
Based on tentative biostratigraphic correlations, the Cynognathus Assemblage Zone is considered to have been emplaced from approximately 249 to 244 Ma, in the later part of the Early Triassic and early part of the Middle Triassic. Based on the presence of Garjainia and Parotosuchus, the Langbergia-Garjainia Subzone is correlated with the Yarenskian Gorizont ("Parotosuchus fauna") of Russia. The "Parotosuchus fauna", exemplified by the Petropavlovskya Svita (a local lithological unit), is assigned to the late Olenekian Stage (latest Early Triassic, about 249-247 Ma) based on correlation with nearby marine fauna.

The classic faunal assemblage of the Trirachodon-Kannemeyeria Subzone is correlated with a wide variety of geological formations. Similar cynodont and dicynodont species are known from the Lower Omingonde Formation of Namibia, the Lower Ntawere Formation of Zambia, and the lower Lifua Member of the Tanzanian Manda Beds. These correlations can be extended beyond Africa, as far as the Fremouw Formation of Antarctica, Donguz Formation ("Eryosuchus fauna") of Russia, and Lower Ermaying Formation of China. Cynognathus and Diademodon fossils have even been found in the Río Seco de la Quebrada Formation of Mendoza Province, Argentina. These formations are often considered early Anisian in age (earliest Middle Triassic, about 247 Ma). However, there is some debate over their age; one ash bed below the Rio Seco de la Quebrada Formation was radiometrically dated to around 236 Ma (early Carnian), much younger than previously suggested purely based on tetrapod biostratigraphy. The classic Cynognathus Assemblage Zone has been equated with the Nonesian Land Vertebrate Faunachron, part of a heavily debated global system of Triassic tetrapod biostratigraphy.

The Cricodon-Ufudocyclops Subzone may be correlated with the upper parts of the Omingonde, Ntawere, and Manda Formations in Africa. Paracyclotosaurus is also known from the Yerrapalli Formation and Upper Denwa Formation of India, while Shansiodon is found in the Upper Ermaying Formation ("Sinokannemeyeria fauna") of China. Shansiodon defines the base of the Perovkan Land Vertebrate Faunachron, which has been applied in a global context. These formations may be late Anisian in age, a suggestion supported by radiometric dating which positions the Upper Ermaying Formation at around 244 Ma.

== See also ==
- Geology of Lesotho
- Geology of Namibia
- Geology of South Africa
- Santa Maria Formation
- Triassic land vertebrate faunachrons
