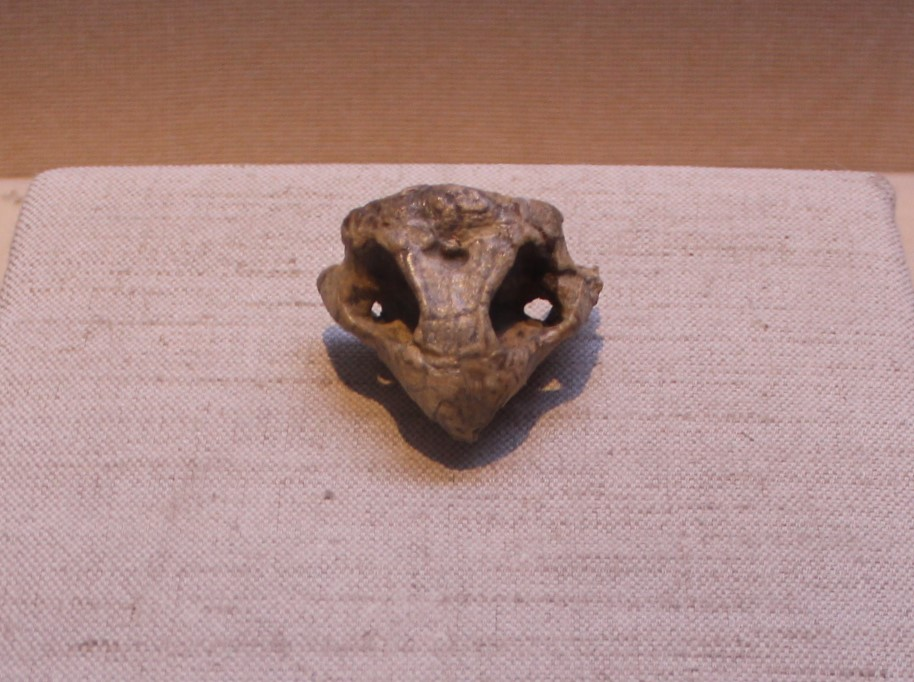
- Cast of holotype, Paleozoological Museum of China

Scientific classification
- Kingdom: Animalia
- Phylum: Chordata
- Class: Reptilia
- Family: †Procolophonidae
- Subfamily: †Procolophoninae
- Genus: †Eumetabolodon; Li, 1983

Species
- †E. bathycephalus Li, 1983 (type)

= Eumetabolodon =

Eumetabolodon Temporal range: Early-?Middle Triassic, 251–244 Ma

Extinct genus of reptiles

Eumetabolodon is an extinct genus of procolophonid 'parareptile' from early and middle Triassic (Induan to earliest Anisian stages) deposits of Nei Mongol, northern China. J. L. Li named two species of Eumetabolodon in 1983: the type species, Eumetabolodon bathycephalus, and a second species, E. dongshengensis, which has since been placed in the distinct genus Youngetta.

== Discovery ==
The type species, E. bathycephalus is known from the holotype IVPP V6064, a nearly complete skull which was collected in the Zhuengeerqi locality, from the upper Heshanggou Formation (Olenekian and earliest Anisian stages), Ordos Basin. A second specimen, IVPP V6070 was collected in the Zhuengeerqi locality, from the Ermaying Formation (upper Olenekian stage), Ordos Basin. An additional 17 specimens, IVPP V6065-69, V6166 (1&2), V6167, V6168 (1&2), V6169-75, were collected in the Gucheng locality, from the upper Heshanggou Formation, Ordos Basin.

The second species, "E." dongshengensis is known only from the holotype IVPP V6073, a partial skull including right frontal, prefrontal, lacrimal, maxilla with seven teeth and the right ramus of lower jaw. It was collected in the Wusilangou locality near Dongsheng (also in Nei Mongol), from the Early Triassic Shihtienfeng Formation. In 2020, Hamley and colleagues placed it in a new genus,Youngetta, forming the new combination Youngetta dongshengensis.

== Phylogeny ==
The cladogram below follows the topology from a 2012 analysis by Cisneros.

- Procolophonidae
  - Coletta
  - Pintosaurus
  - Sauropareion
  - - Phaanthosaurus
    - - Theledectinae
        - "Eumetabolodon" dongshengensis (=Youngetta)
        - Theledectes
      - - Tichvinskia
        - - Leptopleuroninae
          - Procolophoninae
            - - Timanophon
              - - Kapes
                - Thelephon
            - - Eumetabolodon bathycephalus
              - - Procolophon
                - Teratophon
                - Thelerpeton
