= Pintosaurus =

Pintosaurus Temporal range: Late Permian or Early Triassic

Scientific classification
- Kingdom: Animalia
- Phylum: Chordata
- Class: Reptilia
- Subclass: †Parareptilia
- Order: †Procolophonomorpha
- Family: †Procolophonidae
- Genus: †Pintosaurus; Piñeiro, Rojas & Ubilla, 2004

Species
- †P. magnidentis Piñeiro et al., 2004 (type)

Extinct genus of reptiles

Pintosaurus is an extinct genus of basal procolophonid parareptile from Late Permian to Early Triassic deposits of northeastern Uruguay. It is known from the holotype FC-DPV 1181, a partial skull. It was collected from the Buena Vista Formation of the Paraná Basin, in Colonia Orozco, Cerro Largo Department. It was first named by Graciela Piñeiro, Alejandra Rojas and Martín Ubilla in 2004 and the type species is Pintosaurus magnidentis. The generic name honours Dr. Iraja Damiani Pinto. The specific name means "with a large tooth" in Latin, a reference to the large palatal tooth pair.

== Phylogeny ==
Cladogram after Cisneros, 2008:

- Procolophonidae
  - Coletta
  - Pintosaurus
  - Sauropareion
  - - Phaanthosaurus
    - - Theledectinae
        - "Eumetabolodon" dongshengensis
        - Theledectes
      - - Tichvinskia
        - - Procolophoninae
          - Leptopleuroninae
