= Vakhnevo, Nikolsky District, Vologda Oblast =

Vakhnevo Вахнево
- Village
- Location within Vologda Oblast Location within Russia
- Coordinates: 59°47′N 45°10′E
- Country: Russia
- Region: Vologda Oblast
- District: Nikolsky District
- Time zone: UTC+3:00

Vakhnevo (Russian: Вахнево) is a rural locality (a village) and the administrative center of Vakhnevskoye Rural Settlement, Nikolsky District, Vologda Oblast, Russia. The population was 175 as of 2002.

== Geography ==
Vakhnevo is located 37 km northwest of Nikolsk (the district's administrative centre) by road. Turino is the nearest rural locality.

== Paleontology ==
Fossils of tetrapods were found in the Lower Triassic (Rybinskian horizon of Lower Olenekian) deposits of Vakhnevo. A parareptile Tichvinskia jugensis is known by the skull fragment with lower jaw. In addition, temnospondyl amphibians Benthosuchus sushkini (one specimen is also assigned to Rhinesuchus wolgo-dwinensis) and Thoosuchus sp. were found in these deposits of Vakhnevo. A specimen of reptiliomorph Dromotectus spinosum (sic) is collected from the same sites.
