= Theledectes =

Theledectes Temporal range: Middle Triassic, 245–241 Ma

Scientific classification
- Kingdom: Animalia
- Phylum: Chordata
- Class: Reptilia
- Subclass: †Parareptilia
- Order: †Procolophonomorpha
- Family: †Procolophonidae
- Subfamily: †Theledectinae
- Genus: †Theledectes; Modesto & Damiani, 2003

Type species
- †Theledectes perforatus (Gow, 1977a [originally Thelegnathus perforatus])

Extinct genus of reptiles

Theledectes is an extinct genus of theledectine procolophonid parareptile from middle Triassic (early Anisian stage) deposits of Free State Province, South Africa.The type species, Theledectes perforatus, is based on the holotype BP/1/4585, a flattened skull. This skull was collected by the South African palaeontologist, James W. Kitching from Hugoskop in the Rouxville District and referred to subzone B of the Cynognathus Assemblage Zone of the Burgersdorp Formation, Beaufort Group (Karoo Basin). The genus was first named by Sean P. Modesto and Ross J. Damiani in 2003. However, the species was initially assigned to the genus Thelegnathus (now considered to be a nomen dubium) by C.E. Gow in 1977, as the species Thelegnathus perforatus.

== Description ==
Most of the skull is poorly preserved, with the exception of the tooth-bearing elements. Theledectes is the only known parareptile with more than one row of marginal teeth (teeth along the edge of the mouth). The only other reptiles with multiple marginal tooth rows are rhynchosaurs and some captorhinids. The lower jaw has two large incisor-like teeth, akin to Scoloparia. However, the dentition is also distinctly inset from the rest of the face by a large curved area, a trait also known in Hypsognathus. The teeth are large and blunted cones, with circular bases, in contrast to most procolophonids which have teeth that are wider than long. Similar teeth are also observed in "Eumetabolodon" dongshengensis, a Chinese procolophonid previously considered a species of Eumetabolodon. In 2008, Juan Carlos Cisneros named the subfamily Theledectinae to encompass Theledectes and "E." dongshengensis.

== Classification ==
Cladogram after Cisneros, 2008:

- Procolophonidae
  - Coletta
  - Pintosaurus
  - Sauropareion
  - - Phaanthosaurus
    - - Theledectinae
        - "Eumetabolodon" dongshengensis
        - Theledectes
      - - Tichvinskia
        - - Procolophoninae
          - Leptopleuroninae
