= Gomphiosauridion =

Gomphiosauridion Temporal range: Late Triassic

Scientific classification
- Domain: Eukaryota
- Kingdom: Animalia
- Phylum: Chordata
- Clade: †Parareptilia
- Order: †Procolophonomorpha
- Family: †Procolophonidae
- Genus: †Gomphiosauridion
- Species: †G. baileyae

Binomial name
- †Gomphiosauridion baileyae Sues & Olsen, 1993

Extinct genus of reptiles

Gomphiosauridion is an extinct genus of procolophonid that inhabited Virginia during the Late Triassic. It was described by Hans-Dieter Sues and Paul E. Olsen and consists of the species G. baileyae.
