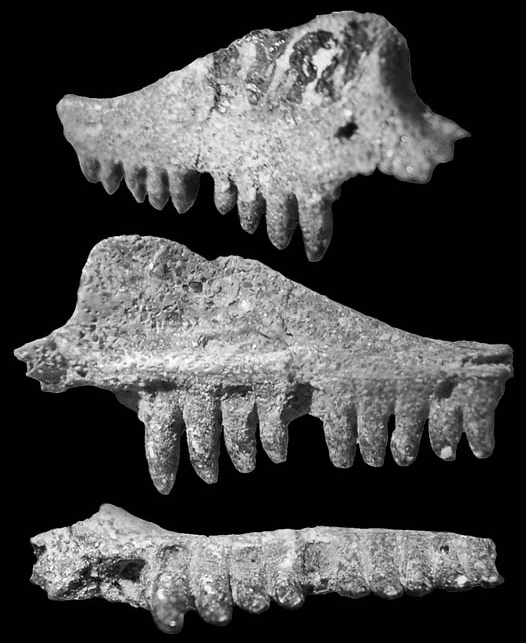
- Right maxilla

Scientific classification
- Domain: Eukaryota
- Kingdom: Animalia
- Phylum: Chordata
- Clade: †Parareptilia
- Order: †Procolophonomorpha
- Family: †Procolophonidae
- Genus: †Suchonosaurus; Tverdokhlebova and Ivakhnenko, 1994

Type species
- †Suchonosaurus minimus Tverdokhlebova and Ivakhnenko, 1994

= Suchonosaurus =

Suchonosaurus Temporal range: Late Permian, 265–252 Ma

Extinct genus of reptiles

Suchonosaurus is an extinct genus of procolophonid reptile from the Late Permian of Russia. It is monotypic, including the species Suchonosaurus minimus, which is itself known only from a single fragment of the upper jaw. Suchonosaurus is currently considered the oldest member of the family Procolophonidae, as it is the only procolophonid known from the Permian period.
