= Smilodonterpeton =

Smilodonterpeton Temporal range: Late Triassic

Scientific classification
- Domain: Eukaryota
- Kingdom: Animalia
- Phylum: Chordata
- Clade: †Parareptilia
- Order: †Procolophonomorpha
- Family: †Procolophonidae
- Genus: †Smilodonterpeton; Skinner, Whiteside & Benton, 2020

Type species
- †Smilodonterpeton ruthinensis Skinner, Whiteside & Benton, 2020

Extinct genus of reptiles

Smilodonterpeton is an extinct genus of procolophonid from the Late Triassic of the United Kingdom. It contains a single species, Smilodonterpeton ruthinensis.
