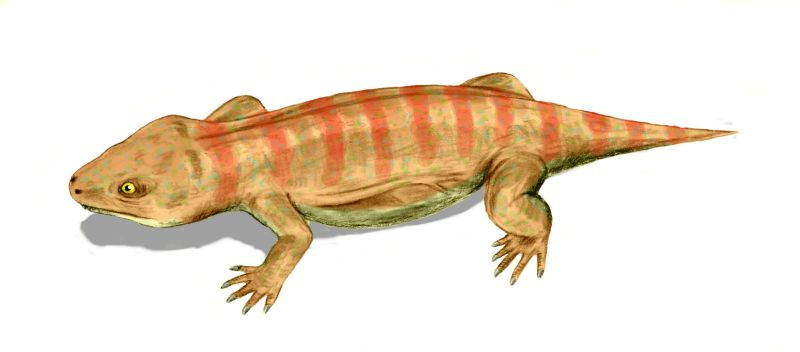
- Procolophon pricei from the Olenekian of South Africa

Scientific classification
- Kingdom: Animalia
- Phylum: Chordata
- Class: Reptilia
- Family: †Procolophonidae
- Subfamily: †Procolophoninae; Lydekker, 1890

Subgroups
- †Anomoiodon; †Burtensia; †Eumetabolodon; †Insulophon?; †Lestanshoria?; †Orenburgia; †Kapes; †Procolina; †Procolophon; †Samaria?; †Teratophon; †Timanophon; †Thelephon; †Thelerpeton

= Procolophoninae =

Procolophoninae Temporal range: Early-Middle Triassic, 249.7–237 Ma

Extinct subfamily of reptiles

Procolophoninae is an extinct subfamily of procolophonid parareptiles from the late Early Triassic to the early Middle Triassic (Olenekian and Anisian stages) of Africa, Antarctica, Asia, Europe and South America. Currently, the oldest-known procolophonine is Procolophon from the earliest Olenekian stage.

== Phylogeny ==
Procolophoninae was named in 1890 by Richard Lydekker. It is a stem-based taxon defined phylogenetically for the first time by Modesto et al. (2002) as "all taxa more related to Procolophon trigoniceps Owen, 1876 than to Leptopleuron lacertinum Owen, 1851". The cladogram below follows Ruta et al. 2011.

- Procolophonidae
  - Coletta
  - Pintosaurus
  - Sauropareion
  - - Phaanthosaurus
    - - Theledectinae
        - "E." dongshengensis
        - Theledectes
      - - Tichvinskia
        - - Leptopleuroninae
          - Procolophoninae
            - - E. bathycephalus
              - - Procolophon
                - Teratophon
                - Thelerpeton
            - - Timanophon
              - - Thelephon
                - - Anomoiodon
                  - Kapes

Below are two cladograms that follow phylogenetic analyses by Butler et al. (2023):

Analyses 1 and 3: Strict consensus of 760 and 18 most parsimonious trees (MPTs).

- - Procolophoninae
    - Teratophon
    - Thelerpeton
    - Procolophon

Analysis 2: Single MPT.

- - Procolophoninae
    - Eumetabolodon bathycephalus
    - - Thelerpeton
      - - Teratophon
        - Procolophon
