= Youngetta =

Youngetta Temporal range: Early Triassic

Scientific classification
- Domain: Eukaryota
- Kingdom: Animalia
- Phylum: Chordata
- Clade: †Parareptilia
- Order: †Procolophonomorpha
- Family: †Procolophonidae
- Genus: †Youngetta; Hamley, Cisneros & Damiani, 2020

Type species
- †Eumetabolodon dongshengensis Hamley, Cisneros & Damiani, 2020 (Li 1983)

Synonyms
- Eumetabolodon dongshengensis Li 1983

Extinct genus of reptiles

Youngetta is an extinct genus of procolophonid from the Early Triassic of China. It contains a single species, Youngetta dongshengensis.
