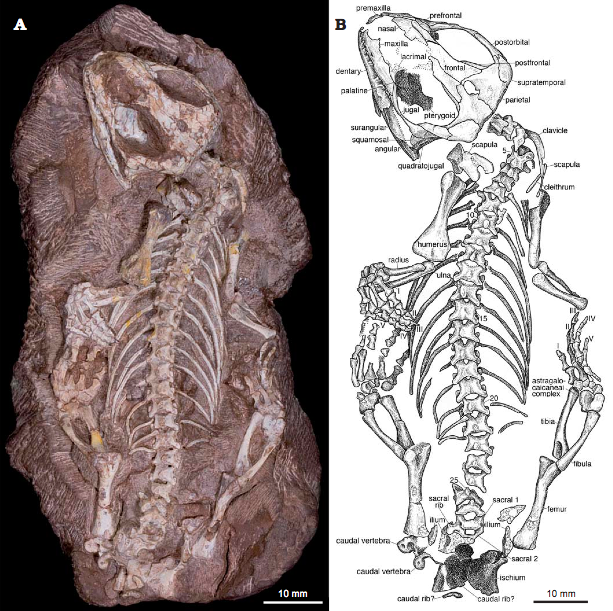
- Sauropareion skeleton NMQR 3602

Scientific classification
- Kingdom: Animalia
- Phylum: Chordata
- Class: Reptilia
- Subclass: †Parareptilia
- Order: †Procolophonomorpha
- Family: †Procolophonidae
- Genus: †Sauropareion; Modesto, Sues & Damiani, 2001

Species
- †S. anoplus Modesto, Sues & Damiani, 2001 (type)

= Sauropareion =

Sauropareion Temporal range: Early Triassic, Induan

Extinct genus of reptiles

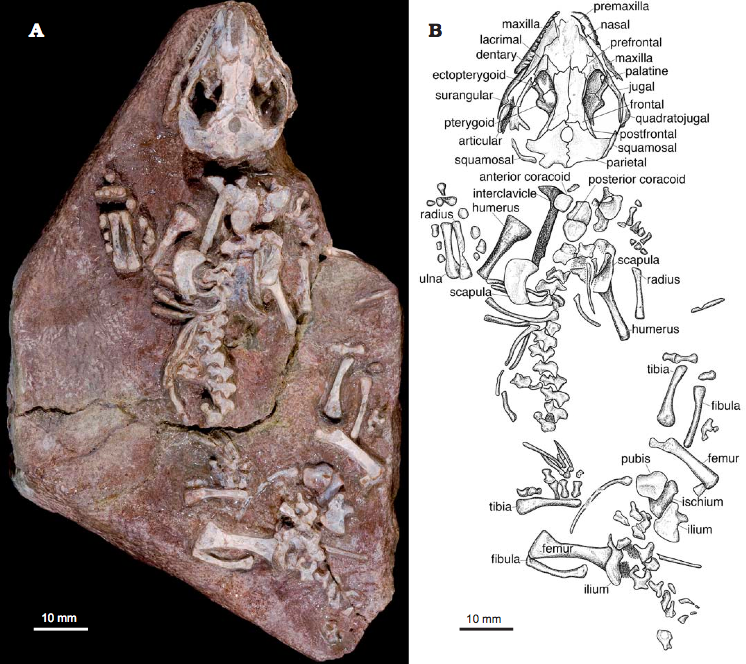
The mostly complete specimen NMQR 3556

Sauropareion (meaning "lizard cheek") is an extinct genus of basal procolophonid parareptile from earliest Triassic (early Induan stage) deposits of Eastern Cape Province, South Africa. It is known from the holotype SAM PK-11192, skull and partial postcranium. It was collected by the late L. D. Boonstra in 1935 from Barendskraal in the Middelburg District and referred to the Lystrosaurus Assemblage Zone of the Beaufort Group (Karoo Basin). It was first named by Sean P. Modesto, Hans-Dieter Sues and Ross J. Damiani in 2001 and the type species is Sauropareion anoplus. The generic name means "lizard", sauros, and "cheek", pareion from Greek in reference to the lizard-like appearance of the temporal region. The specific name comes from the Greek word anoplos, meaning "without arms or armour".

== Phylogeny ==
Cladogram after Cisneros, 2008:

- Procolophonidae
  - Coletta
  - Pintosaurus
  - Sauropareion
  - - Phaanthosaurus
    - - Theledectinae
        - "Eumetabolodon" dongshengensis
        - Theledectes
      - - Tichvinskia
        - - Procolophoninae
          - Leptopleuroninae
