= Graciela Piñeiro =

Uruguayan biologist and paleontologist

Graciela Helena Piñeiro Martínez is a Uruguayan biologist and paleontologist.

Her work led to the discovery of Mesosaurus fossils in Uruguay. She has also been an associate editor of the Swiss Journal of Palaeontology.
