= Anomoiodon =

Anomoiodon Temporal range: Early Triassic, 249–247 Ma

Scientific classification
- Kingdom: Animalia
- Phylum: Chordata
- Class: Reptilia
- Subclass: †Parareptilia
- Order: †Procolophonomorpha
- Family: †Procolophonidae
- Subfamily: †Procolophoninae
- Genus: †Anomoiodon von Huene, 1939

Type species
- †Anomoiodon liliensterni von Huene, 1939

Extinct genus of reptiles

Anomoiodon is an extinct genus of procolophonine procolophonid parareptile from early Triassic deposits of Thuringia, Germany. It is known only from the holotype MB.R.3539B and paratype MB.R.3539A, two articulated, three-dimensionally preserved partial skeletons on one block which represent two individuals. The holotype includes nearly complete skull and lower jaw. The block was collected from the lowest layer of the Chirotherium Sandstone Member (Middle Bundsandstein) of the Solling Formation, dating to the early Olenekian faunal stage of the Early Triassic, about 249-247 million years ago. It was first named by Friedrich von Huene in 1939 and the type species is Anomoiodon liliensterni. Laura K. Säilä, who redescribed Anomoiodon in 2008, found it to be a leptopleuronine using a phylogenetic analysis. The most recent analysis, performed by Ruta et al. (2011) found it to be a procolophonine instead. However, both analyses found that it is most closely related to the Russian procolophonid Kapes.
