= Juan Carlos Cisneros =

Argentine footballer (born 1977)

Personal information
- Date of birth: 17 May 1987 (age 39)
- Place of birth: Buenos Aires, Argentina
- Height: 1.69 m (5 ft 7 in)
- Position: Midfielder

Senior career*
Years	Team	Apps	(Gls)
1997–1999	Deportivo Español	21	(1)
1999–2000	Cipolletti	15	(5)
2000	Colo-Colo	3	(0)
2001	San Martín de San Juan	15	(2)
2001–2002	Guaraní		
2002–2003	Ferro Carril Oeste	3	(0)
2004–2007	Jorge Wilstermann		
2008	Argentino de Rosario	7	(1)
2012–2013	Atlético Concepción	7	(0)
- * Club domestic league appearances and goals

Juan Carlos Cisneros (born 18 May 1977) is an Argentine former professional footballer who played as a midfielder for Clubs of Argentina, Chile, Bolivia and Paraguay.
