= Oryporan =

Oryporan Temporal range: Early Triassic

Scientific classification
- Domain: Eukaryota
- Kingdom: Animalia
- Phylum: Chordata
- Clade: †Parareptilia
- Order: †Procolophonomorpha
- Family: †Procolophonidae
- Genus: †Oryporan; Pinheiro, Silva-Neves & Da-Rosa, 2021

Type species
- †Oryporan insolitus Pinheiro, Silva-Neves & Da-Rosa, 2021

Genus of reptiles (fossil)

Oryporan is an extinct genus of procolophonid from the Early Triassic Sanga do Cabral Formation of Brazil. The type species is Oryporan insolitus.
