= Thelerpeton =

Thelerpeton Temporal range: Middle Triassic, 245–241 Ma

Scientific classification
- Domain: Eukaryota
- Kingdom: Animalia
- Phylum: Chordata
- Clade: †Parareptilia
- Order: †Procolophonomorpha
- Family: †Procolophonidae
- Subfamily: †Procolophoninae
- Genus: †Thelerpeton; Modesto & Damiani, 2003

Type species
- †Thelerpeton oppressus (Gow, 1977 [originally Thelegnathus oppressus])

Extinct genus of reptiles

Thelerpeton is an extinct genus of procolophonine procolophonid parareptile from middle Triassic (early Anisian stage) deposits of Free State Province, South Africa. It is known from the holotype BP/1/4538, a nearly complete skull. It was collected by the South African palaeontologist, James W. Kitching from Hugoskop in the Rouxville District and referred to subzone B of the Cynognathus Assemblage Zone of the Burgersdorp Formation, Beaufort Group (Karoo Basin). It was first named by Sean P. Modesto and Ross J. Damiani in 2003 and the type species is Thelerpeton oppressus. It was first assigned to a species of Thelegnathus (now considered to be a nomen dubium), Thelegnathus oppressus.

== Phylogeny ==
In their phylogenetic analyses, Butler et al. (2023) defined Thelerpeton as a sister taxon to Teratophon and Procolophon or as a sister taxon to clade consisting of Teratophon and Procolophon within Procolophoninae. The results are shown in two cladograms below:

Analyses 1 and 3: Strict consensus of 760 and 18 most parsimonious trees (MPTs).

- - Procolophoninae
    - Teratophon
    - Thelerpeton
    - Procolophon

Analysis 2: Single MPT.

- - Procolophoninae
    - Eumetabolodon bathycephalus
    - - Thelerpeton
      - - Teratophon
        - Procolophon
