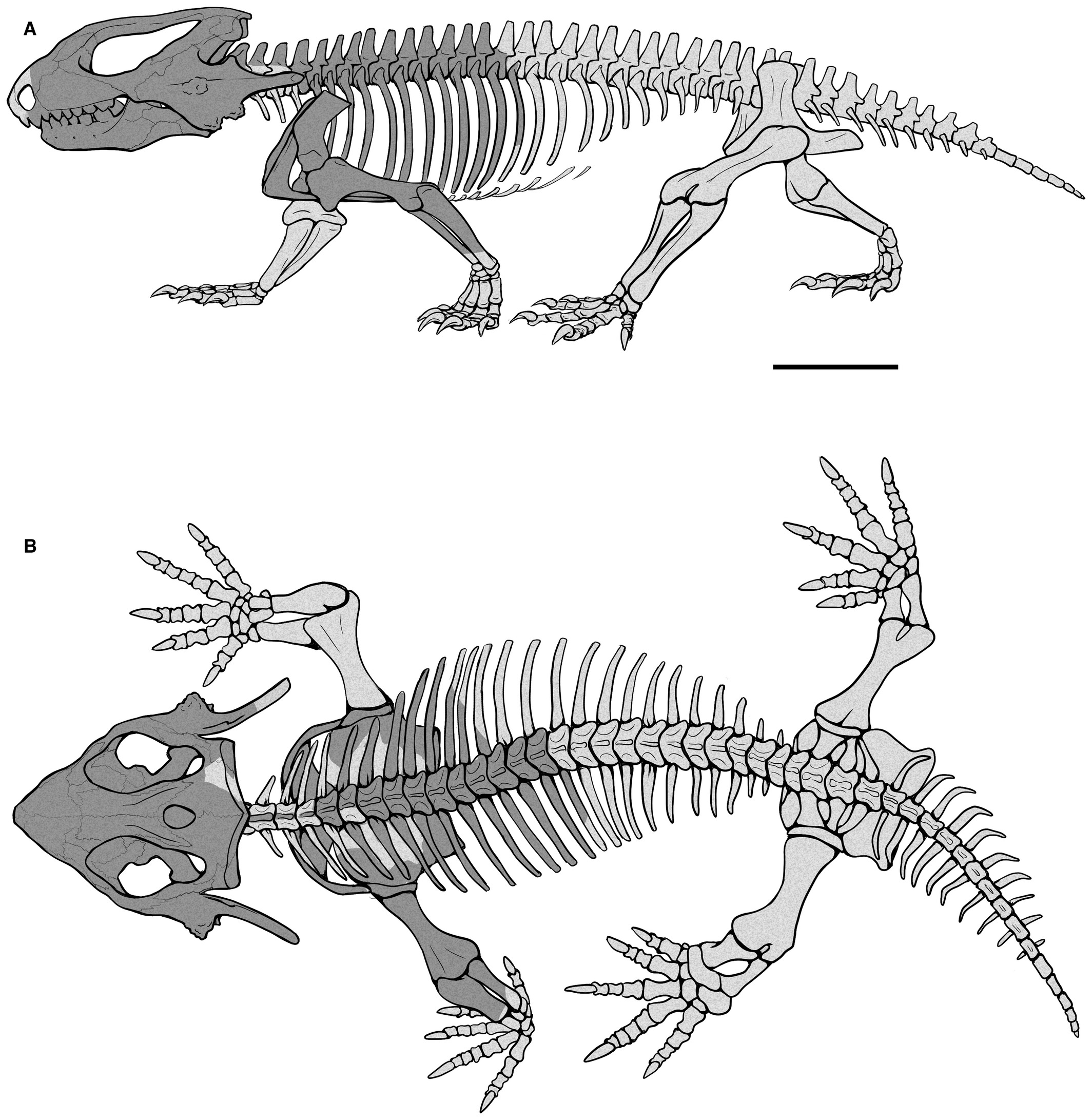

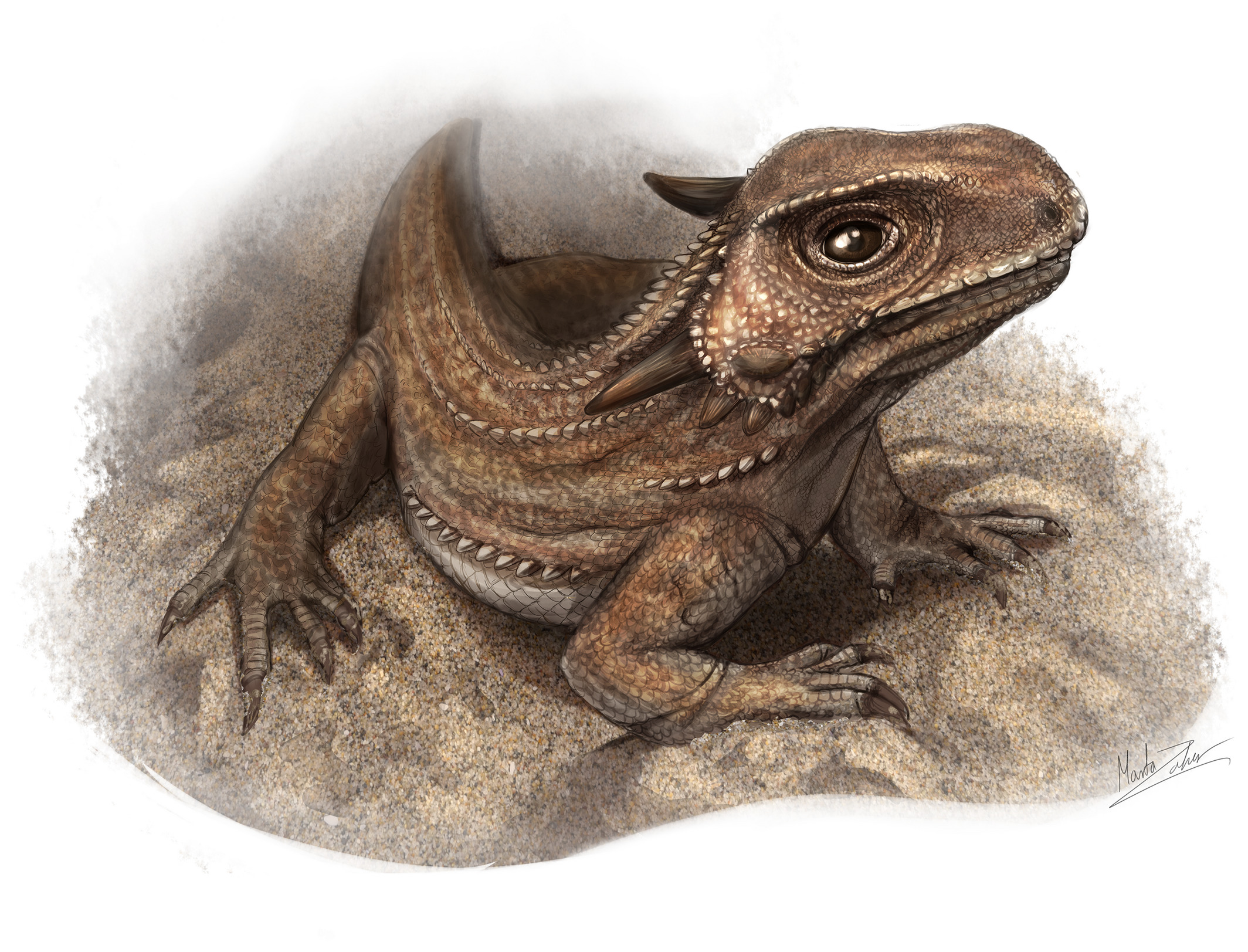
- Skeleton (top) and life restoration (bottom) of Kapes bentoni (Procolophoninae) scale bar = 1cm

Scientific classification
- Kingdom: Animalia
- Phylum: Chordata
- Class: Reptilia
- Superfamily: †Procolophonoidea
- Family: †Procolophonidae; Seeley, 1888

Subgroups and Genera
- †Coletta; †Gomphiosauridion?; †Kinelia?; †Kitchingnathus; †Lasasaurus; †Oryporan; †Pentacolophon; †Phaanthosaurus; †Pintosaurus; †Sauropareion; †Sauropia?; †Smilodonterpeton; †Sphenosaurus; †Suchonosaurus; †Spondylolestes?; †Tichvinskia; †Xenodiphyodon?; †Youngetta; †Leptopleuroninae; †Procolophoninae; †Theledectinae

Synonyms
- Sclerosauridae Nopcsa, 1923

= Procolophonidae =

Procolophonidae Temporal range: Late Permian–Late Triassic

Extinct family of reptiles

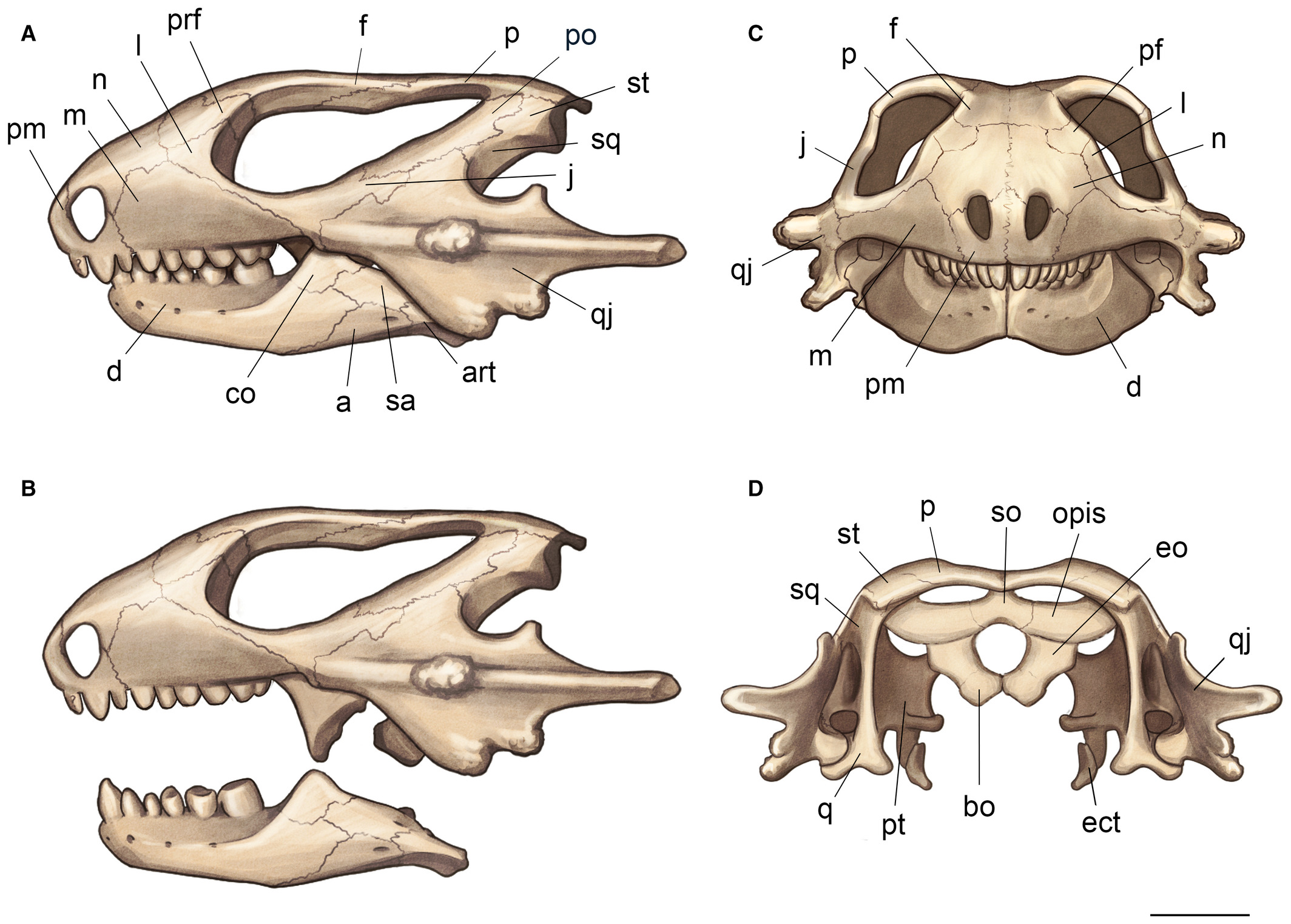
Skull of Kapes bentoni

Procolophonidae is an extinct family of small, lizard-like procolophonian "parareptiles" known from the Late Permian to Late Triassic that were distributed across Pangaea, having been reported from Europe, North America, China, South Africa, South America, Antarctica, and Australia.

== Ecology ==
The most primitive procolophonids were likely insectivorous or omnivorous, while more derived members of the clade developed bicusped molars, likely either herbivores feeding on high fiber vegetation or durophagous omnivores. Many members of the group are noted for spines projecting from the quadratojugal bone of the skull, which likely served a defensive purpose as well as possibly also for display. At least some taxa were likely fossorial burrowers.

== Evolution ==
Procolophonids radiated in the aftermath of the Permian-Triassic extinction event, adapting to changes in the availability of different food resources. While diverse during the Early and Middle Triassic, they had very low diversity during the Late Triassic, and were extinct by the beginning of the Jurassic.

== Phylogeny ==
The family is defined as all taxa more closely related to Procolophon trigoniceps than to Owenetta rubidgei. In their 2026 description of Pentacolophon, Pinheiro and colleagues included it in an updated version of the phylogenetic matrix of Meade et al. (2024), the latest of several iterations of a dataset focused on procolophonoid relationships. Their parsimony analyses resulted in several unresolved polytomies, especially at the base of Procolophonidae. Using a tip-dated Bayesian analysis (the first such instance published for procolophonids), relationships were substantially better-resolved, albeit with lower node support. These results are displayed in the cladogram below:

- †Procolophonoidea
  - Owenettidae
    ⊞
    - Barasaurus besairiei
    - - Candelaria barbouri
      - Saurodektes kitchingorum
    ⊟
  - Procolophonidae
    - - Coletta seca
      - - Pintosaurus magnidentis
        - Sauropareion anoplus
    - - - Phaanthosaurus spp.
        - - Kitchingnathus untabeni
          - - Lasasaurus beltanae
            - Oryporan insolitus
      - - - Pentacolophon winterbergensis
          - Phonodus dutoitorum
        - - Theledectinae
            - Youngetta dongshengensis
            - - Eomurruna yurrgensis
              - - Procolina teresae
                - Theledectes perforatus
          - - Timanophon raridentatus
            - - Tichvinskia vjatkensis
              - - - Anomoiodon liliensterni
                  - - Thelephon contritus
                    - Kapes majmesculae
                - - Procolophoninae
                    - Eumetabolodon bathycephalus
                    - - Procolophon trigoniceps
                      - - Teratophon spinigenis
                        - Thelerpeton oppressus
                  - Leptopleuroninae
                    - - Kapes bentoni
                      - - Neoprocolophon asiaticus
                        - Pentaedrusaurus ordosianus
                    - - Threordatoth chasmatos
                      - - Sclerosaurus armatus
                        - - Mandaphon nadra
                          - - Scoloparia glyphanodon
                            - - Leptopleuron lacertinum
                              - - Hwiccewyrm trispiculum
                                - - Soturnia caliodon
                                  - - Hypsognathus fenneri
                                    - - 'Abajo form'
                                        (Chinle Fm., UT)
                                      - - Libognathus sheddi
                                        - 'Glen's Ferry form'
                                          (Chinle Fm., AZ)

== Sources ==
- Lambert, David (2001). Dinosaur Encyclopedia. New York: Dorling Kindersley. p. 72. ISBN 978-0-7894-7935-8.
