= Kestrosaurus =

Kestrosaurus Temporal range: Triassic

Scientific classification
- Kingdom: Animalia
- Phylum: Chordata
- Clade: Tetrapoda
- Order: †Temnospondyli
- Suborder: †Stereospondyli
- Clade: †Capitosauria
- Family: †Mastodonsauridae
- Genus: †Kestrosaurus; Haughton, 1925
- Species: †K. dreyeri

Binomial name
- †Kestrosaurus dreyeri Haughton, 1925

Extinct genus of temnospondyls

Kestrosaurus, occasionally misspelt as Kerstisaurus, is an extinct genus of Triassic capitosauroid temnospondyl within the family Mastodonsauridae.

== See also ==
- Prehistoric amphibian
- List of prehistoric amphibians
