= Procolina =

Procolina Temporal range: Early Triassic

Scientific classification
- Domain: Eukaryota
- Kingdom: Animalia
- Phylum: Chordata
- Clade: †Parareptilia
- Order: †Procolophonomorpha
- Family: †Procolophonidae
- Subfamily: †Procolophoninae
- Genus: †Procolina; Borsuk−Białynicka & Lubka, 2009

Type species
- †Procolina teresae Borsuk−Białynicka & Lubka, 2009

Extinct genus of reptiles

Procolina is an extinct genus of procolophonid parareptile known from partial remains found in Early Triassic (Olenekian age) rocks of Czatkowice 1, Poland. It was first named by Magdalena Borsuk−Białynicka; and Mariusz Lubka in 2009 and the type species is Procolina teresae
