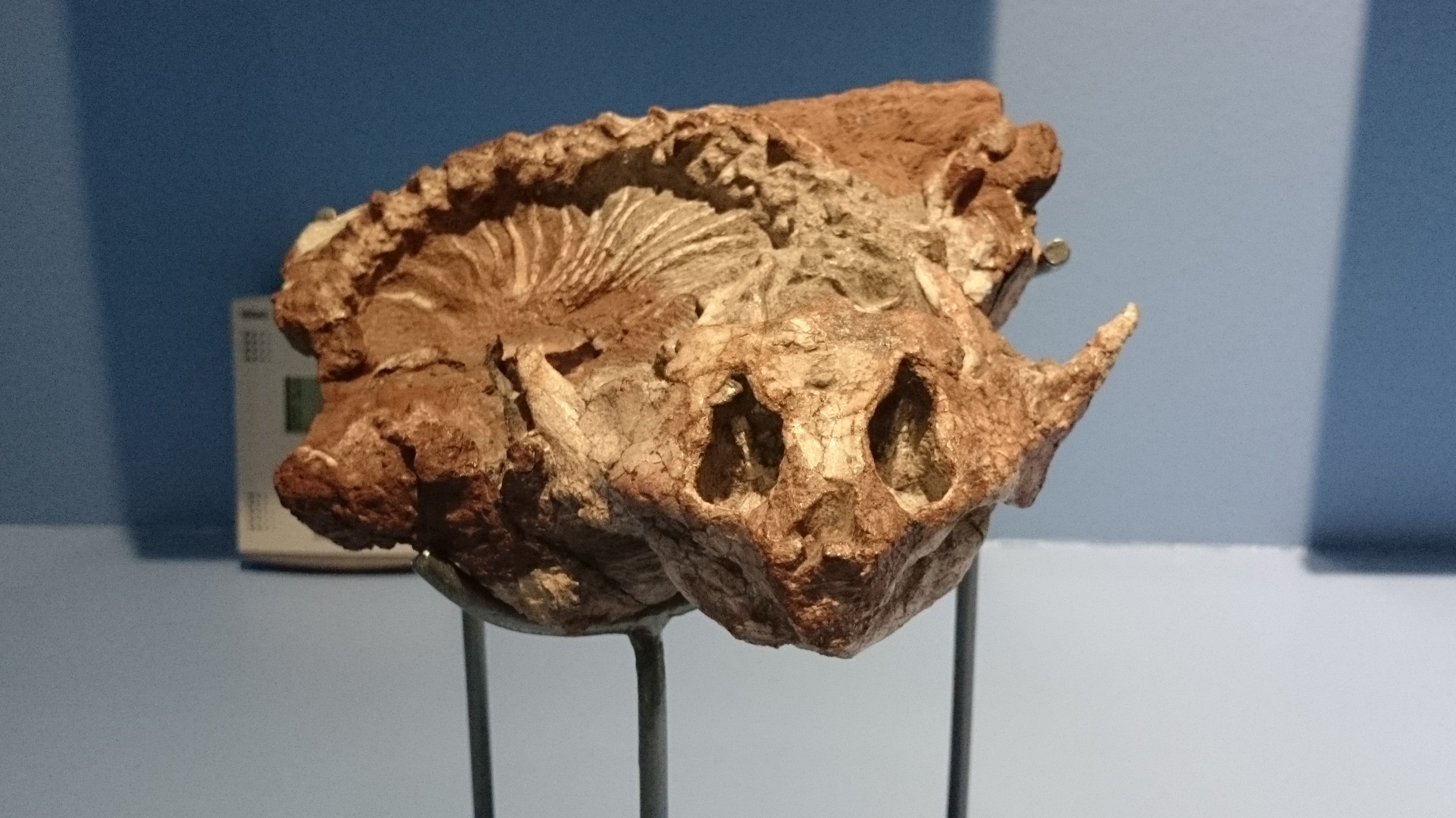
- Fossil

Scientific classification
- Domain: Eukaryota
- Kingdom: Animalia
- Phylum: Chordata
- Clade: †Parareptilia
- Order: †Procolophonomorpha
- Family: †Procolophonidae
- Subfamily: †Procolophoninae
- Genus: †Teratophon; Modesto & Damiani, 2003

Type species
- †Teratophon spinigenis (Gow, 1977a [originally Thelegnathus spinigenis])

= Teratophon =

Teratophon Temporal range: Middle Triassic, 245–241 Ma

Extinct genus of reptiles

Teratophon is an extinct genus of procolophonine procolophonid parareptile from middle Triassic (early Anisian stage) deposits of Free State Province, South Africa. It is known from the holotype BP/1/4299, a nearly complete skull. It was collected by the South African palaeontologist, James W. Kitching from Hugoskop in the Rouxville District and referred to subzone B of the Cynognathus Assemblage Zone of the Burgersdorp Formation, Beaufort Group (Karoo Basin). It was first named by Sean P. Modesto and Ross J. Damiani in 2003 and the type species is Teratophon spinigenis. It was first assigned to a species of Thelegnathus (now considered to be a nomen dubium), Thelegnathus spinigenis. The distinguishing feature of this genus is a noticeable posterolateral spine-like process of the quadratojugal.

== Phylogeny ==
In their phylogenetic analyses, Butler et al. (2023) defined Teratophon as a sister taxon to Procolophon and Thelerpeton or only to Procolophon within Procolophoninae. The results are shown in two cladograms below:

Analyses 1 and 3: Strict consensus of 760 and 18 most parsimonious trees (MPTs).

- - Procolophoninae
    - Teratophon
    - Thelerpeton
    - Procolophon

Analysis 2: Single MPT.

- - Procolophoninae
    - Eumetabolodon bathycephalus
    - - Thelerpeton
      - - Teratophon
        - Procolophon
