= Lasasaurus =

Lasasaurus Temporal range: Early Triassic

Scientific classification
- Domain: Eukaryota
- Kingdom: Animalia
- Phylum: Chordata
- Clade: †Parareptilia
- Order: †Procolophonomorpha
- Family: †Procolophonidae
- Genus: †Lasasaurus; Falconnet et al., 2012

Type species
- †Lasasaurus beltanae Falconnet et al., 2012

Extinct genus of reptiles

Lasasaurus is an extinct genus of procolophonid parareptile known from the Early Triassic Middle Sakamena Formation, of northern Madagascar.
