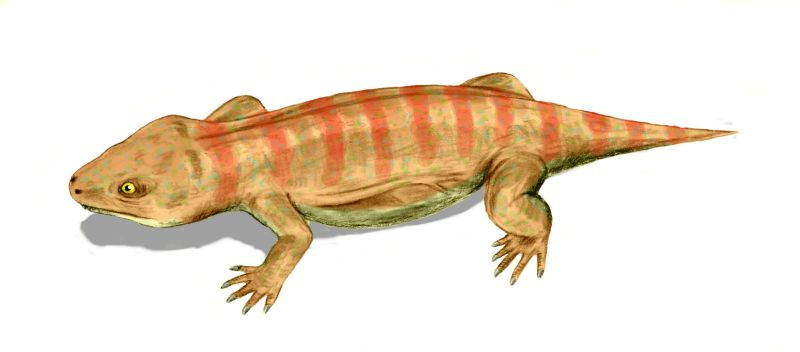
- Procolophon pricei from the Early Triassic of South Africa

Scientific classification
- Kingdom: Animalia
- Phylum: Chordata
- Class: Reptilia
- Subclass: †Parareptilia
- Order: †Procolophonomorpha
- Family: †Procolophonidae
- Subfamily: †Procolophoninae
- Genus: †Procolophon; Owen 1876

Type species
- Procolophon trigoniceps Owen 1876

Species
- P. trigoniceps Owen 1876 (type)

Synonyms
- Procolophon minor Owen, 1876; Procolophon griersoni Seeley, 1878; Procolophon cuneiceps Seeley, 1878; Procolophon laticeps Seeley, 1878; Procolophon platyrhinus Seeley, 1905; Procolophon sphenorhinus Seeley, 1905; Procolophon baini Broom, 1905; Procolophonoides baini Ivachnenko, 1979; Procolophon pricei Lavina, 1983; Procolophon brasiliensis Cisneros & Schultz, 2002

= Procolophon =

Procolophon Temporal range: Early Triassic

Extinct genus of reptiles

Procolophon (from Greek: πρό pró, 'before' and Greek: κολοφών kolophṓn, 'summit') is a genus of lizard-like procolophonid parareptiles that first appeared in the Early Triassic (Induan) of South Africa, Brazil, and Antarctica. It persisted through the Permian–Triassic extinction event, but went extinct in the beginning of the Early Middle Triassic.

== History of discovery ==
The first Procolophon fossil was discovered in the 1870s in Donnybrook, an area southwest of Pietermaritzburg in present-day Kwa-Zulu Natal of South Africa. The fossil was accessioned to Harry Seeley, who described the fossil in 1878. Nevertheless, the type species is P. trigoniceps, based on specimen NHMUK PV R 1726 from Tafelberg which was described by Richard Owen a year earlier after its donation by William Guybon Atherstone in 1875. Numerous other fossils have been recovered since from localities across the Eastern Cape and Free State provinces of South Africa.

== Description ==
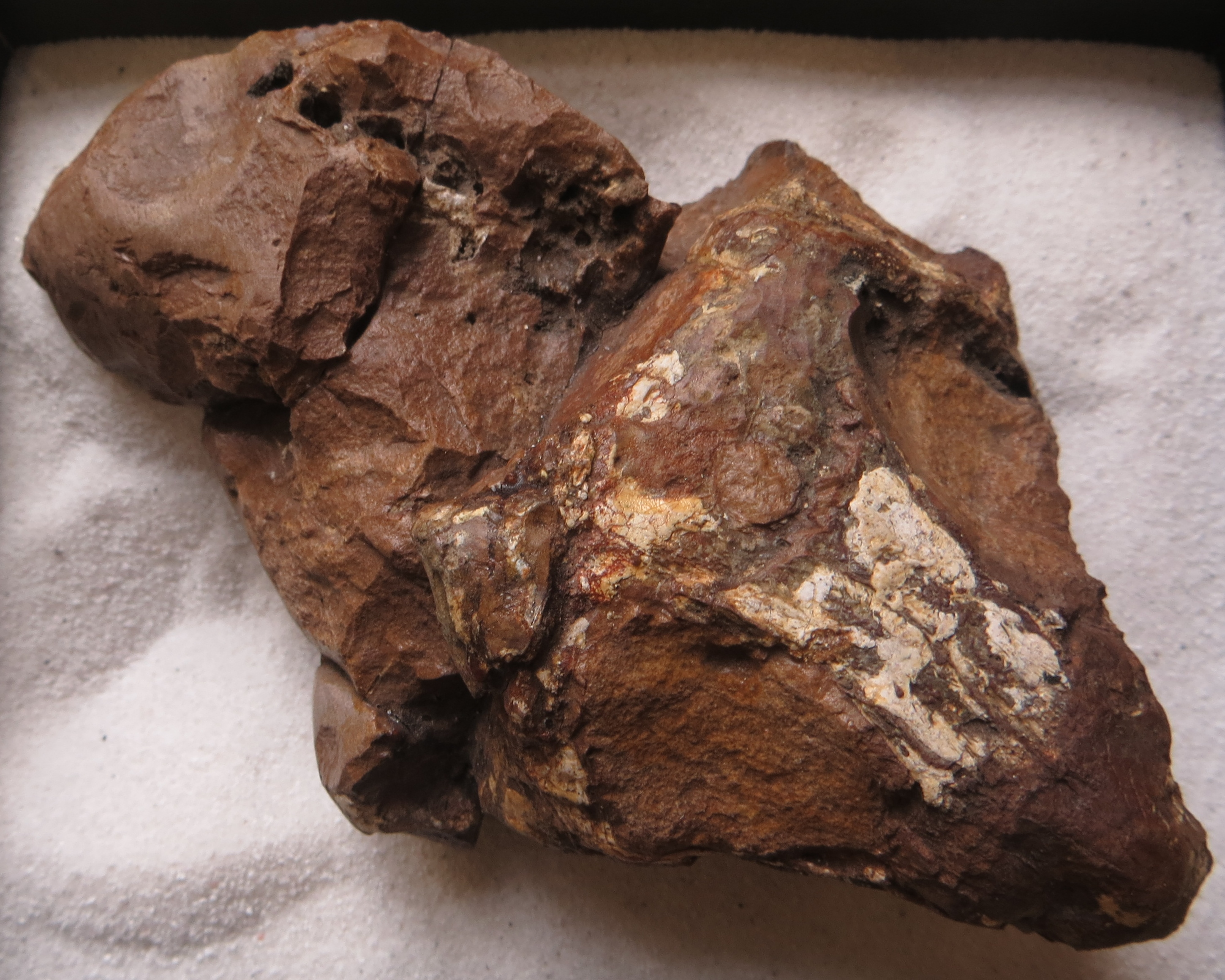
Fossil

Procolophon reached a length up to 30 centimetres (12 in), and is considered to have been a small herbivore or insectivore. The skull of Procolophon is distinct because of its latero-posteriorly facing paired cheek spikes, along with spiked dermal ossicles. Paleontologists debate the function of the cheek spikes. Some paleontologists posit that the bony protrusions were points for muscle attachments. Procolophon also had large eyes, and may have had acute night vision. Its teeth were peg-like and suitable for crushing plant matter. The front of the skull was short and blunt with the nasal opening very close to the mouth.

== Classification ==
Procolophon is a basal member of Procolophonidae, a clade of parareptiles that are closely related to larger, more derived parareptiles such as the pareiasaur, Bradysaurus. Procolophonids are also related to mesosaurids and millerettids. Procolophon was considered to share a sister-taxon relationship with Tichvinskia, a procolophonid from the lower Triassic of Russia.

The cladogram below follows a phylogenetic analysis by Modesto and Damiani (2007) in which Procolophon is defined in polytomy with Thelerpeton and Leptopleuroninae:

- Procolophonoidea
  - Owenettidae
    - - Owenetta rubidgei
      - Barasaurus
    - - "Owenetta" kitchingorum
      - Candelaria
  - Procolophonidae
    - Coletta
    - - Sauropareion
      - - Contritosaurus
        - - Procolophon
          - Thelerpeton
          - Leptopleuroninae
            - Tichvinskia
            - - Scoloparia
              - - Leptopleuron
                - Hypsognathus

In their phylogenetic analyses, Butler et al. (2023) defined Procolophon as a sister taxon to Teratophon and Thelerpeton or only to Teratophon within Procolophoninae. The results are shown in two cladograms below:

Analyses 1 and 3: Strict consensus of 760 and 18 most parsimonious trees (MPTs).

- - Procolophoninae
    - Teratophon
    - Thelerpeton
    - Procolophon

Analysis 2: Single MPT.

- - Procolophoninae
    - Eumetabolodon bathycephalus
    - - Thelerpeton
      - - Teratophon
        - Procolophon

== Correlation ==
Procolophon occupied a wide geographic range. Fossils of the genus were found in the Lystrosaurus Assemblage Zone of the Katberg and Normandien Formations of South Africa, to the Sanga do Cabral Formation of the Paraná Basin in eastern Brazil, to the Fremouw Formation of the Transantarctic Mountains. Numerous subspecies and sister taxa are also found in the lower Triassic (Induan) of Germany, North America, and Russia.
