= Thelephon =

Thelephon Temporal range: Middle Triassic, 245–241 Ma

Scientific classification
- Kingdom: Animalia
- Phylum: Chordata
- Class: Reptilia
- Family: †Procolophonidae
- Subfamily: †Procolophoninae
- Genus: †Thelephon; Modesto & Damiani, 2003

Type species
- †Thelephon contritus (Gow, 1977a [originally Thelegnathus contritus])

Extinct genus of reptiles

Thelephon is an extinct genus of procolophonine procolophonid parareptile from middle Triassic (early Anisian stage) deposits of Free State Province, South Africa. It is known from the holotype BP/1/3512, a partial skull lacking the snout and anterior third of the mandible. It was collected by the South African palaeontologist, James W. Kitching from Hugoskop in the Winnaarsbaken and referred to subzone B of the Cynognathus Assemblage Zone of the Burgersdorp Formation, Beaufort Group (Karoo Basin). It was first named by Sean P. Modesto and Ross J. Damiani in 2003 and the type species is Thelephon contritus. It was first assigned to a species of Thelegnathus (now considered to be a nomen dubium), Thelegnathus contritus.

== Palaeobiology ==
=== Palaeoecology ===
Thelephon likely fed on crayfish, as demonstrated by palaeoichnological evidence of procolophonids digging up Reniformichnus burrows in the Burgersdorp Formation.
