= Scoloparia =

Scoloparia Temporal range: Triassic, ?Carnian–Norian

Scientific classification
- Kingdom: Animalia
- Phylum: Chordata
- Class: Reptilia
- Family: †Procolophonidae
- Subfamily: †Leptopleuroninae
- Genus: †Scoloparia; Sues and Baird, 1998

Type species
- †Scoloparia glyphanodon Sues and Baird, 1998

Extinct genus of reptiles

Scoloparia is an extinct genus of procolophonid parareptile from the Triassic of Canada. Fossils have been found in the Early Triassic to Norian-age Wolfville Formation in Nova Scotia, Canada. Like many Triassic procolophonids, Scoloparia has expanded molar-like teeth that indicate that the animal was likely herbivorous.
