= Timanophon =

Timanophon Temporal range: Early Triassic, 249–247 Ma

Scientific classification
- Domain: Eukaryota
- Kingdom: Animalia
- Phylum: Chordata
- Clade: †Parareptilia
- Order: †Procolophonomorpha
- Family: †Procolophonidae
- Subfamily: †Procolophoninae
- Genus: †Timanophon; Novikov, 1991

Type species
- †Timanophon raridentatus Novikov, 1991

Extinct genus of reptiles

Timanophon is an extinct genus of procolophonine procolophonid parareptile from early Triassic deposits of Arkhangelsk, Russia. It is known from the holotype PIN 3359/11, a partial skeleton including nearly complete skull and lower jaw which was previously referred to Burtensia sp. by Ivakhnenko in 1975. It was collected in the Mezenskaya Pizhma and Lower Syamzhen'ga localities from the Pizhmomezenskoi Formation. Ten additional specimens from the same localities are PIN 3359/1-3, 3359/63-65 and 4364/35-38. The fragmentary dentaries PIN 3360/1-3 were collected in the Vybor River locality, from the same formation. All specimens came from the Ustmylian Gorizont, dating to the early Olenekian faunal stage of the Early Triassic, about 249-247 million years ago. It was first named by I. V. Novikov in 1991 and the type species is Timanophon raridentatus.
