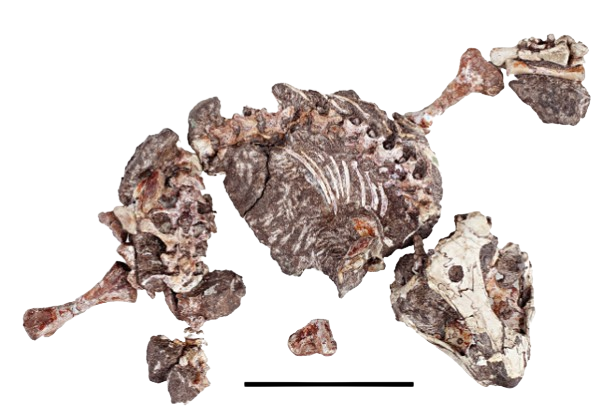
- Holotype of Eomurruna

Scientific classification
- Kingdom: Animalia
- Phylum: Chordata
- Class: Reptilia
- Family: †Procolophonidae
- Subfamily: †Theledectinae; Cisneros, 2008

Type genus
- †Theledectes Modesto & Damiani, 2003

Genera
- †Eomurruna; †Procolina; †Theledectes; †Youngetta

= Theledectinae =

Theledectinae Temporal range: Early–Middle Triassic, Induan–Anisian

Subfamily of reptiles (fossil)

Theledectinae is an extinct subfamily of stem-reptiles within the family Procolophonidae. Theledectines existed in South Africa, China and Australia during the Early–Middle Triassic (Induan to Anisian ages). Theledectinae was named by Juan Carlos Cisneros in 2008 to include the genus Theledectes, and the species "Eumetabolodon" dongshengensis (since placed in the new genus Youngetta. Cladistically, it is defined as "all taxa more closely related to Theledectes perforatus (Gow, 1977) than to Procolophon trigoniceps Owen, 1876". In 2020, Hamley et al. added the new genus Eomurruna from Australia to this subfamily.
