= Coletta (reptile) =

Coletta Temporal range: Early Triassic, Induan

Scientific classification
- Domain: Eukaryota
- Kingdom: Animalia
- Phylum: Chordata
- Clade: †Parareptilia
- Order: †Procolophonomorpha
- Family: †Procolophonidae
- Genus: †Coletta; Gow, 2000

Species
- †C. seca Gow, 2000 (type)

Extinct genus of reptiles

Coletta is an extinct genus of basal procolophonid parareptile from Early Triassic (Induan stage) deposits of Eastern Cape Province, South Africa. It is known from the holotype GHG 228, a skull with fragmentary lower jaws. It was collected on the farm Brakfontein 333 in the Cradock District. It was found in the Katberg Formation of the Beaufort Group (Karoo Basin) and referred to the Lystrosaurus Assemblage Zone. It was first named by Christopher E. Gow in 2000 and the type species is Coletta seca.

Coletta was one of the most basal procolophonids, showing similarities to owenettids such as Owenetta. The generic name Coletta references both Procolophon and Owenetta, signifying its transitional nature. The specific name C. seca refers to seca, a Latin word referring to any stabbing weaponry. This is based on large, fang-like teeth on its vomer bones on the roof of the mouth.
