= Phaanthosaurus =

Phaanthosaurus Temporal range: Early Triassic, Induan

Scientific classification
- Domain: Eukaryota
- Kingdom: Animalia
- Phylum: Chordata
- Clade: †Parareptilia
- Order: †Procolophonomorpha
- Family: †Procolophonidae
- Genus: †Phaanthosaurus; Chudinov & Vjushkov, 1956

Species
- †P. ignatjevi Chudinov & Vjushkov, 1956 (type); †P. simus (Ivakhnenko, 1974)

Synonyms
- Contritosaurus simus Ivakhnenko, 1974; C. convector Ivakhnenko, 1974; Phaantosaurus Butler et al., 2023 (sic)

Extinct genus of reptiles

Phaanthosaurus is an extinct genus of basal procolophonid parareptile from early Triassic (Induan stage) deposits of Nizhnii Novgorod, Russian Federation. It is known from the holotype PIN 1025/1, a mandible (a dentary). It was collected from Vetluga River, Spasskoe village and referred to the Vokhmian terrestrial horizon of the Vokhma Formation. It was first named by P. K. Chudinov and B. P. Vjushkov in 1956 and the type species is Phaanthosaurus ignatjevi.

In 2000, Spencer and Benton found Contritosaurus to be junior synonym of Phaanthosaurus. C. simus Ivakhnenko, 1974 which is known from the holotype PIN 3355/1, a partial skull with right mandible from the same location, and from three paratypes, was recombined as P. simus. They also found that the second species of Contritosaurus, C. convector (PIN 3357/1, a mandible) is a junior synonym of P. simus. Recent cladistic analyses by Juan Carlos Cisneros, 2008 and Mark J. Macdougall and Sean P. Modesto, 2011 accepted this synonymy.

Its bone microanatomy suggests a terrestrial lifestyle, as for most early amniotes.
