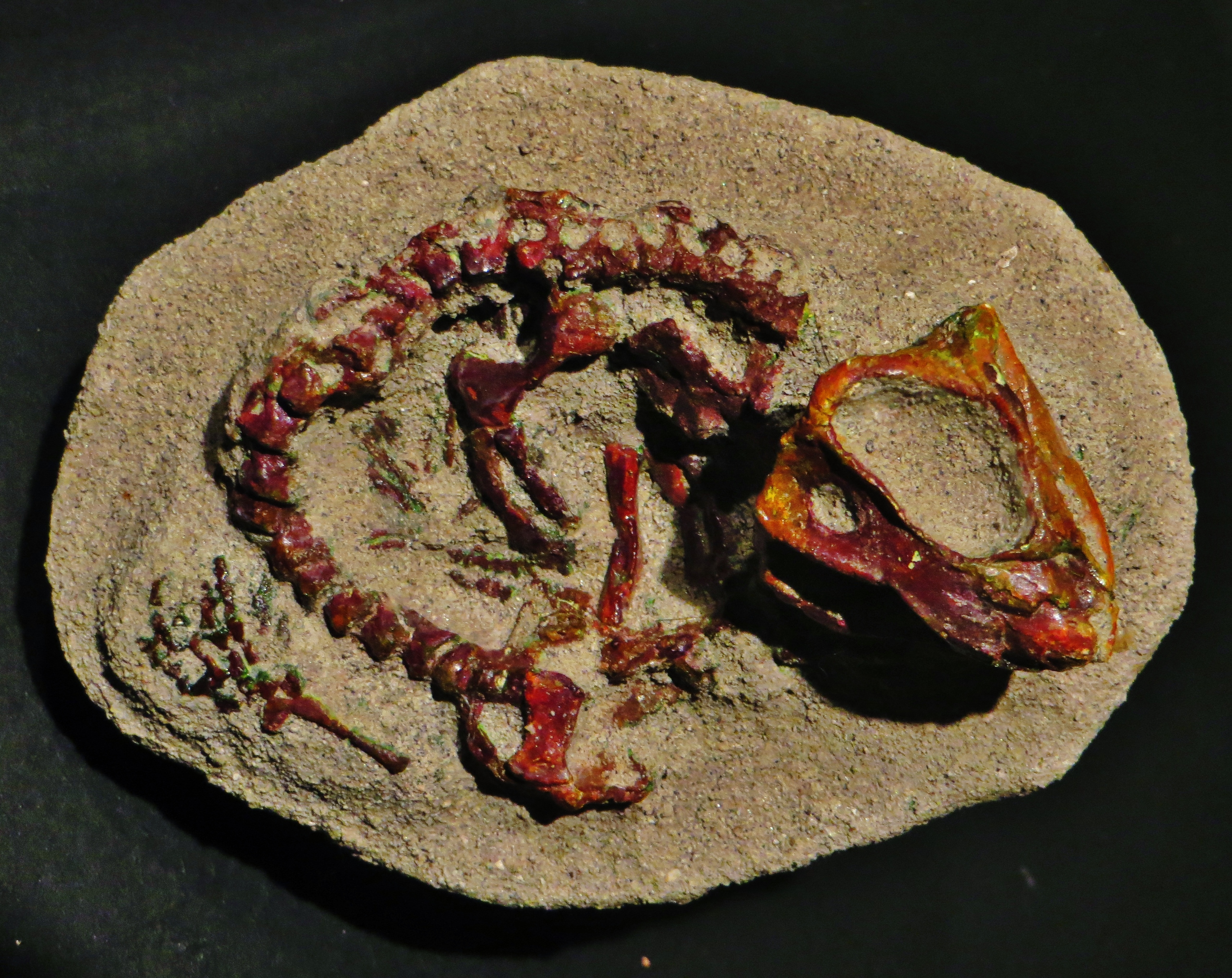
- Tichvinskia vjatkensis

Scientific classification
- Domain: Eukaryota
- Kingdom: Animalia
- Phylum: Chordata
- Clade: †Parareptilia
- Order: †Procolophonomorpha
- Family: †Procolophonidae
- Genus: †Tichvinskia; Ivakhnenko, 1973

Type species
- †Tichvinskia vjatkensis Ivakhnenko, 1973

= Tichvinskia =

Tichvinskia Temporal range: Early Triassic

Extinct genus of reptiles

Tichvinskia is an extinct genus of procolophonid parareptile from the Early Triassic of Russia.
