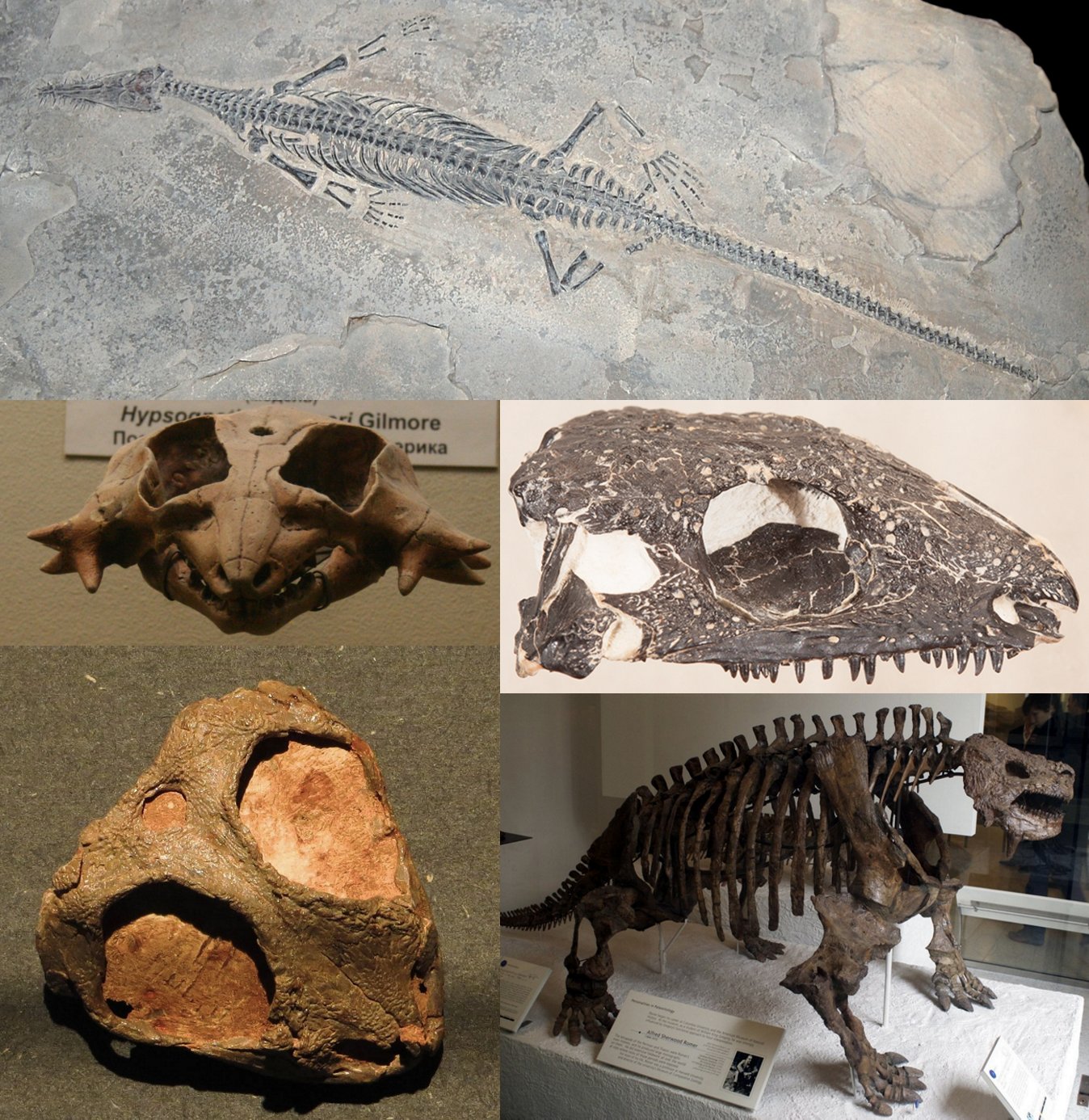
- A collage of five parareptile fossils. Clockwise from top, Mesosaurus tenuidens (a mesosaur), Delorhynchus cifellii (a probable acleistorhinid), Scutosaurus karpinskii (a pareiasaur), Nyctiphruretus acudens (a nyctiphruretid), Hypsognathus fenneri (a procolophonid)

Scientific classification
- Kingdom: Animalia
- Phylum: Chordata
- Class: Reptilia
- Subclass: †Parareptilia; Olson, 1947

Traditional major subgroups
- Mesosauria; Millerosauria; Procolophonomorpha; Bolosauridae; Ankyramorpha; Lanthanosuchoidea; Procolophonia; Pantestudines? (historically included in Procolophonia, but contradicted by genetic evidence)

= Parareptilia =

Parareptiles Temporal range: Late Carboniferous–Triassic (Moscovian–Rhaetian), 306–201.3 Ma

Extinct subclass of stem-reptiles

Parareptilia (lit. 'near-reptiles') is an extinct subclass of basal sauropsids (reptiles, in the broad sense). Traditionally considered the sister taxon to Eureptilia (the group that likely contains all living reptiles), its validity as a monophyletic clade has been disputed by modern cladistic analyses.

"Parareptiles" first arose near the end of the Carboniferous period and achieved their highest diversity during the Permian period. Several ecological innovations were first accomplished by "parareptiles" among reptiles. These include the first reptiles to return to marine ecosystems (mesosaurs), the first bipedal reptiles (bolosaurids such as Eudibamus), the first reptiles with advanced hearing systems (nycteroleterids and others), and the first large herbivorous reptiles, the pareiasaurs, the largest of which reached the sized of oxen. The only "parareptiles" to survive into the Triassic period were the procolophonoids, a group of small lizard-like generalists, omnivores, and herbivores. The largest family of procolophonoids, the procolophonids, rediversified in the Triassic, but subsequently declined and became extinct by the end of the period.

Compared to most "eureptiles", "parareptiles" retained fairly "primitive" characteristics such as robust, low-slung bodies and large supratemporal bones at the back of the skull. While all but the earliest eureptiles were diapsids, with two openings at the back of the skull, "parareptiles" were generally more conservative in the extent of temporal fenestration. In its modern usage, Parareptilia was first utilized as a cladistically correct alternative to Anapsida, a term which historically referred to reptiles with solid skulls lacking holes behind the eyes. Nevertheless, not all "parareptiles" have "anapsid" skulls, and some do have large holes in the back of the skull. They also had several unique adaptations, such as a large pit on the maxilla, a broad prefrontal-palatine contact, and the absence of a supraglenoid foramen of the scapula.

Like many other so-called "anapsids", "parareptiles" were historically understudied. Interest in their relationships was reinvigorated in the 1990s, when several studies argued that Testudines (turtles and their kin) were members of Parareptilia. Although this would suggest that Parareptilia was not extinct after all, the origin of turtles is still heavily debated. Many other morphological or genetic analyses find more support for turtles among diapsid eureptiles such as sauropterygians or archosauromorphs, rather than "parareptiles".

Several studies from the early 2020s onwards have suggested that "Parareptilia" is not a monophyletic clade but a paraphyletic or polyphyletic grade of primitive sauropsids, with some "parareptiles" more closely related to modern reptiles than to other "parareptilians".

== Description ==
=== Skull ===
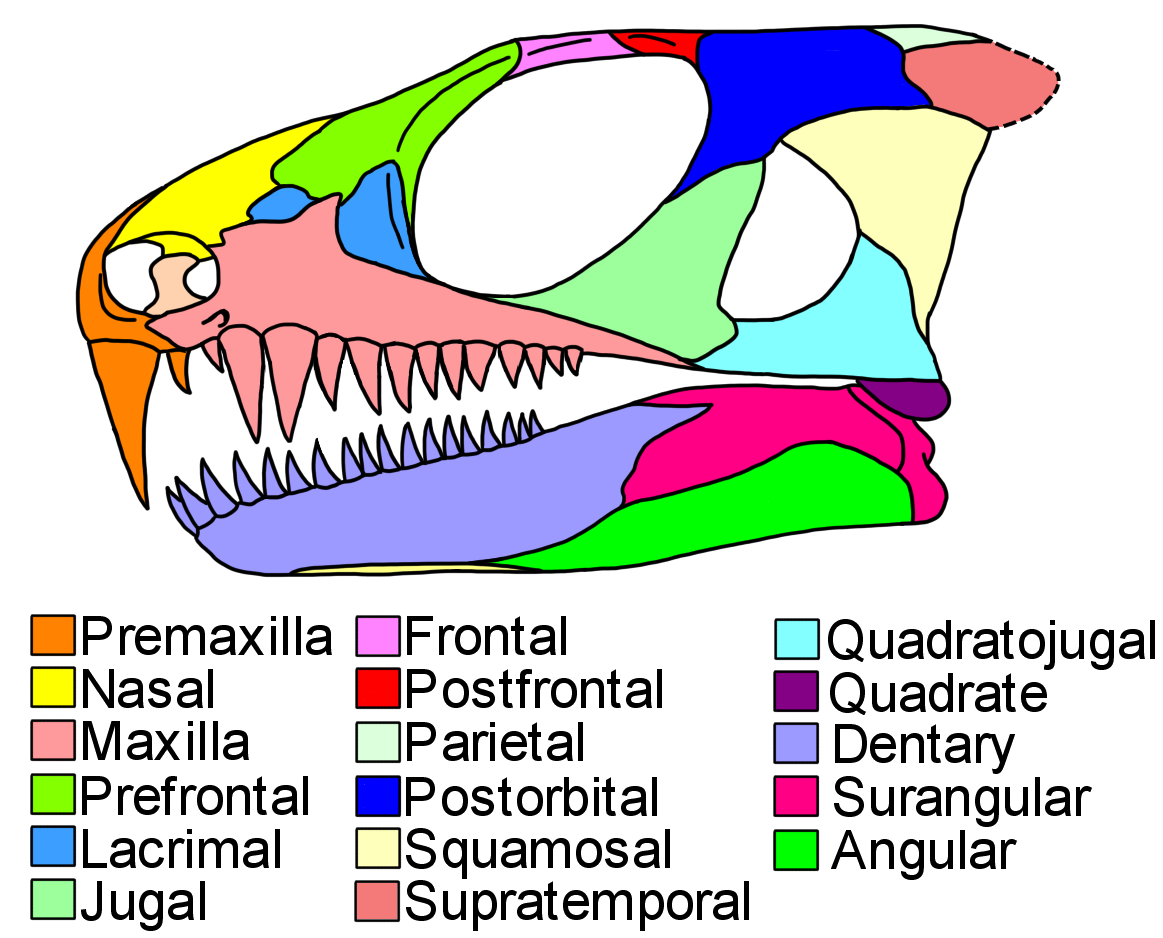
A skull diagram of Colobomycter pholeter, a probable acleistorhinid from the Early Permian. Unlike most parareptiles, this species lacks tabular bones and has a heterodont dentition with large caniform teeth.

Parareptilian skulls were diverse, from mesosaurs with elongated snouts filled with hundreds of thin teeth, to the snub-nosed, knob-encrusted skulls of pareiasaurs. "Parareptile" teeth were quite variable in shape and function between different species. However, they were relatively homogenous on the same skull. While most synapsids and many early eureptiles had a caniform region of enlarged fang-like teeth in the front half of the skull, very few "parareptiles" possessed caniform teeth.

Many amniotes have a row of small pits running along bones at the edge of the mouth, but "parareptiles" have only a few pits, with one especially large pit near the front of the maxilla. The rest of the skull was often strongly-textured by pits, ridges, and rugosities in most "parareptile" groups, occasionally culminating in complex bosses or spines. The maxilla is usually low, while the prefrontal and lacrimal bones in front of the eye are both fairly large. In all "parareptiles" except mesosaurs, the prefrontal has a plate-like inner branch which forms a broad contact with the palatine bone of the palate. A prominent hole, the foramen orbitonasale, is present at the intersection of the prefrontal, palatine, and lacrimal. Parareptilian palates also have toothless and reduced ectopterygoid bones, a condition taken to extremes in mesosaurs, which have lost the ectopterygoid entirely.

Most "parareptiles" had large orbits (eye sockets), significantly longer (from front-to-back) than the region of the skull behind the eyes. The jugal bone, which forms the lower and rear edge of the orbit, has a very thin suborbital process (front branch), usually no subtemporal process (lower rear branch), and a thick dorsal process (upper rear branch). The squamosal and quadratojugal bones, which lie behind the jugal, are quite large and are embayed from behind to accommodate the internal ears. "Parareptiles" were traditionally considered to have an "anapsid"-type skull, with the jugal, squamosal, and quadratojugal firmly sutured together without any gaps or slits between them. This principle still holds true for some subgroups, such as pareiasaurs. However, a growing number of "parareptile" taxa are known to have had an infratemporal fenestra, a large hole or emargination lying among the bones behind the eye. In some taxa, the margins of such openings may include additional bones such as the maxilla or postorbital. When seen from above, the rear edge of the skull is straight or has a broad median embayment. From inside to outside, the rear edge of the skull is formed by three pairs of bones: the postparietals, tabulars, and supratemporals. "Parareptiles" have particularly large supratemporals, which often extend further backwards than the tabulars.

Apart from the long, slender jaws of mesosaurs, most "parareptile" jaws were short and thick. The jaw joint is formed by the articular (in the lower jaw) and the quadrate (in the upper jaw). In many "parareptiles", the jaw joint is shifted forwards on the skull past the rear part of the braincase. Jaw muscles attach to the coronoid process, a triangular spur in the rear half of the jaw. Both the tooth-bearing dentary bone and the posterior foramen intermandibularis (a hole on the inner surface of the jaw) reach as far back as the coronoid process. The surangular bone, which forms the upper rear part of the jaw, is narrow and plate-like.

=== Postcranial skeleton ===
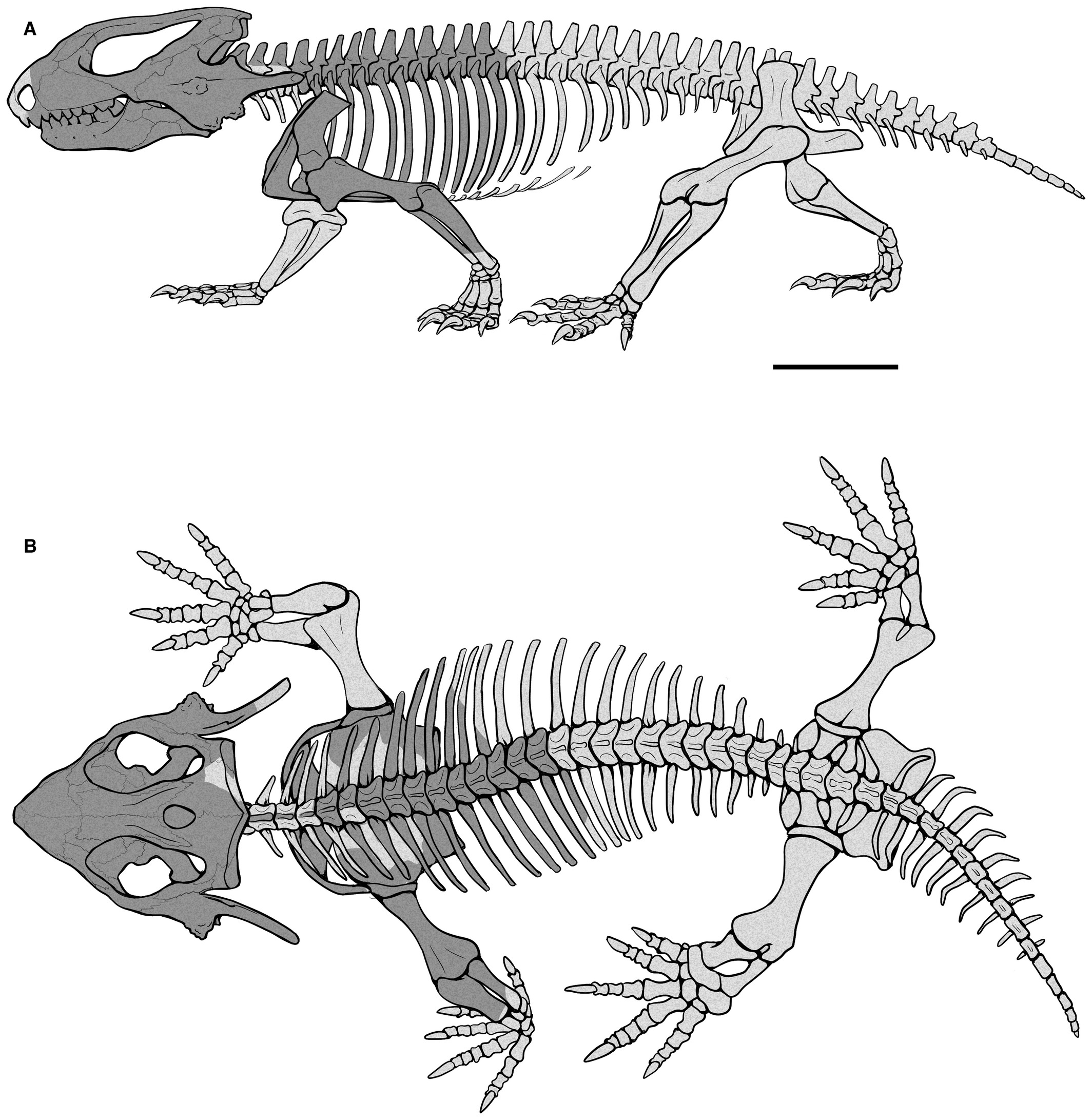
Skeleton of Kapes bentoni, a procolophonid from the Middle Triassic of England

There was some variation in the body shape of "parareptiles", with early members of the group having an overall lizard-like appearance, with thin limbs and long tails. The most successful and diverse groups of "parareptiles", the pareiasaurs and procolophonids, had massively-built bodies with reduced tails and stout limbs with short digits. This general body shape is shared with other "cotylosaurs" such as captorhinids, diadectomorphs, and seymouriamorphs. Another general "cotylosaurian" feature in "parareptiles" is the "swollen" appearance of their vertebrae, which have wide and convex upper surfaces.

"Parareptiles" lacked a supraglenoid foramen on the scapula, a hole which is also absent in varanopids and neodiapsids. Most had a fairly short and thick humerus which was expanded near the elbow. Unlike early eureptiles, the outer part of the lower humerus possessed both a small supinator process and an ectepicondylar foramen and groove. The ulna generally has a poorly developed olecranon process, another trait in contrast with the earliest eureptiles.

Most "parareptiles" had an ilium which was fan-shaped and vertically (rather than horizontally) oriented, an unusual trait among early amniotes. The sacral ribs, which connect the spine to the ilium, were usually slender or fan-shaped, with large gaps between them. The hindlimbs were typically not much longer than the forelimbs, and had thick reptilian ankle bones and short toes. There are some exceptions, such as Eudibamus, an early Permian bolosaurid with very elongated hindlimbs.

== History of classification ==
The name Parareptilia was coined by Olson in 1947 to refer to an extinct group of Paleozoic reptiles, as opposed to the rest of the reptiles or Eureptilia ("true reptiles"). Olsen's term was generally ignored, and various taxa later known as "parareptiles" were generally not placed into exclusive groups with each other. Many were classified as "cotylosaurs" (a wastebasket taxon of stout-bodied "primitive" reptiles or reptile-like tetrapods) or "anapsids" (reptiles without temporal fenestrae, such as modern turtles).

Parareptilia's usage was revived by cladistic studies, to refer to those traditional "anapsids" that were thought to be unrelated to turtles. Gauthier et al. (1988) provided the first phylogenetic definitions for the names of many amniote taxa and argued that captorhinids and turtles were sister groups, constituting the clade Anapsida (in a much more limited context than typically applied). A name had to be found for a clade of various early-diversing Permian and Triassic reptiles no longer included in the anapsids. Olsen's term "parareptiles" was chosen to refer to this clade, although its instability within their analysis meant that Gauthier et al. (1988) were not confident enough to erect Parareptilia as a formal taxon. Their cladogram is as follows:

- Amniota
  - Synapsida
  - Sauropsida
    - "Parareptiles"
      - †Mesosauridae
      - - †Procolophonidae
        - - †Millerettidae
          - - †Pareiasauria
    - Reptilia
      - Anapsida
        - †Captorhinidae
        - Testudines
      - Romeriida
        - †Protorothyrididae
        - Diapsida

Laurin & Reisz (1995) found a slightly different topology, in which Reptilia is divided into Parareptilia and Eureptilia. They argued that Testudines (turtles) were members of Parareptilia; in fact, they explicitly defined Parareptilia as "Testudines and all amniotes more closely related to them than to diapsids". Captorhinidae was transferred to Eureptilia, while Parareptilia included turtles alongside many of the taxa named as such by Gauthier et al. (1988). There was one major exception: mesosaurs were placed outside both groups, as the sister taxon to the crown group Reptilia. Mesosaurs were still considered sauropsids, as they were closer to reptiles than to synapsids. The traditional group "Anapsida" was rejected as a paraphyletic assemblage. The cladogram of Laurin & Reisz (1995) is provided below:

- Amniota
  - Synapsida
  - Sauropsida
    - †Mesosauridae
    - Reptilia
      - Parareptilia
        - †Millerettidae
        - Procolophonia
          - †Pareiasauria
          - Testudinomorpha
            - †Procolophonidae
            - - Testudines
      - Eureptilia
        - †Captorhinidae
        - Romeriida
          - †Protorothyrididae
          - Diapsida

In contrast, several studies in the mid-to-late 1990s by Olivier Rieppel and Michael deBraga argued that turtles were actually lepidosauromorph diapsids related to the sauropterygians. The diapsid affinities of turtles have been supported by molecular phylogenies. The first genome-wide phylogenetic analysis was completed by Wang et al. (2013). Using the draft genomes of Chelonia mydas and Pelodiscus sinensis, the team used the largest turtle data set to date in their analysis and concluded that turtles are likely a sister group of crocodilians and birds (Archosauria). This placement within the diapsids suggests that the turtle lineage lost diapsid skull characteristics, since turtles possess an anapsid skull. This would make Parareptilia a totally extinct group with skull features that resemble those of turtles through convergent evolution. With turtles positioned outside of "parareptiles", Tsuji and Müller (2009) redefined Parareptilia as "the most inclusive clade containing Milleretta rubidgei and Procolophon trigoniceps, but not Captorhinus aguti."

The cladogram below follows an analysis by M.S. Lee, in 2013.

- Amniota
  - Synapsida
  - Sauropsida
    - †Parareptilia
      - †Millerettidae
      - - †Eunotosaurus
        - †Ankyramorpha
          - †Lanthanosuchoidea
          - †Procolophonia
            - †Procolophonoidea
            - †Pareiasauromorpha
    - Eureptilia
      - †Captorhinidae
      - Romeriida
        - †Paleothyris
        - Diapsida
          - †Araeoscelidia
          - Neodiapsida
            - †Claudiosaurus
            - - †Younginiformes
              - - Lepidosauromorpha
                - Archelosauria
                  - Archosauromorpha
                    - †Choristodera
                    - - - †Trilophosaurus
                        - †Rhynchosauria
                      - Archosauriformes
                  - Pantestudines
                    - †Sauropterygia
                    - - †Placodontia
                      - - †Sinosaurosphargis
                        - - †Odontochelys
                          - - †Proganochelys
                            - Testudines

A 2020 study by David P. Ford and Roger B. J. Benson found that Parareptilia was nested within Diapsida as the sister group to Neodiapsida, with the clade containing Neodiapsida and Parareptilia dubbed Neoreptilia, which suggests that "parareptiles" were ancestrally diapsid. This excluded mesosaurs, which were again found to be basal among the sauropsids. Some studies have found Parareptilia to be paraphyletic, with some "parareptiles" more closely related to diapsids than to other "parareptiles", with Simões et al. (2022) using Neoreptilia for the clade containing Procolophonomorpha+Neodiapsida. More recent studies support this hypothesis, instead finding anatomical evidence placing millerettid "parareptiles" as sister to Neodiapsida, forming the clade Parapleurota.

Cladogram after Jenkins et al. (2025), with traditional "parareptiles" highlighted in orange:

- Diapsida
  - †Araeoscelidia
  - - †Bolosauridae
    - Neoreptilia
      - †Ankyramorpha
        - †Acleistorhinidae
        - - †Pareiasauromorpha
          - †Procolophonoidea
      - - †Mesosauridae
        - - - †Cabarzia
            - - †Ascendonanus
              - †Orovenator
          - Parapleurota
            - †Millerettidae
              - †Lanthanolania
              - - †Broomia
                - - †Milleropsis
                  - - †Milleretta
                    - †Millerosaurus
            - Neodiapsida
              - †Younginidae
              - - †Tangasauridae
                - - †Weigeltisauridae
                  - - †Claudiosaurus
                    - Sauria

== Evolutionary history ==
The oldest known "parareptiles" are the bolosaur Erpetonyx and the acleistorhinid Carbonodraco from the Late Carboniferous (Moscovian-Gzhelian) of North America, which represents the only known Carboniferous "parareptiles", indicating that the initial diversification of the group took place in the Late Carboniferous. Numerous "parareptile" lineages appeared during the early Permian and the group reached a cosmopolitan distribution. "Parareptile" diversity declined towards the end of the Permian and procolophonoids, which first appeared during the Late Permian, were the only group of "parareptiles" to survive the Permian–Triassic extinction event. Procolophonid diversity sharply declined beginning in the Middle Triassic, with the group becoming extinct by the end of the Triassic.
