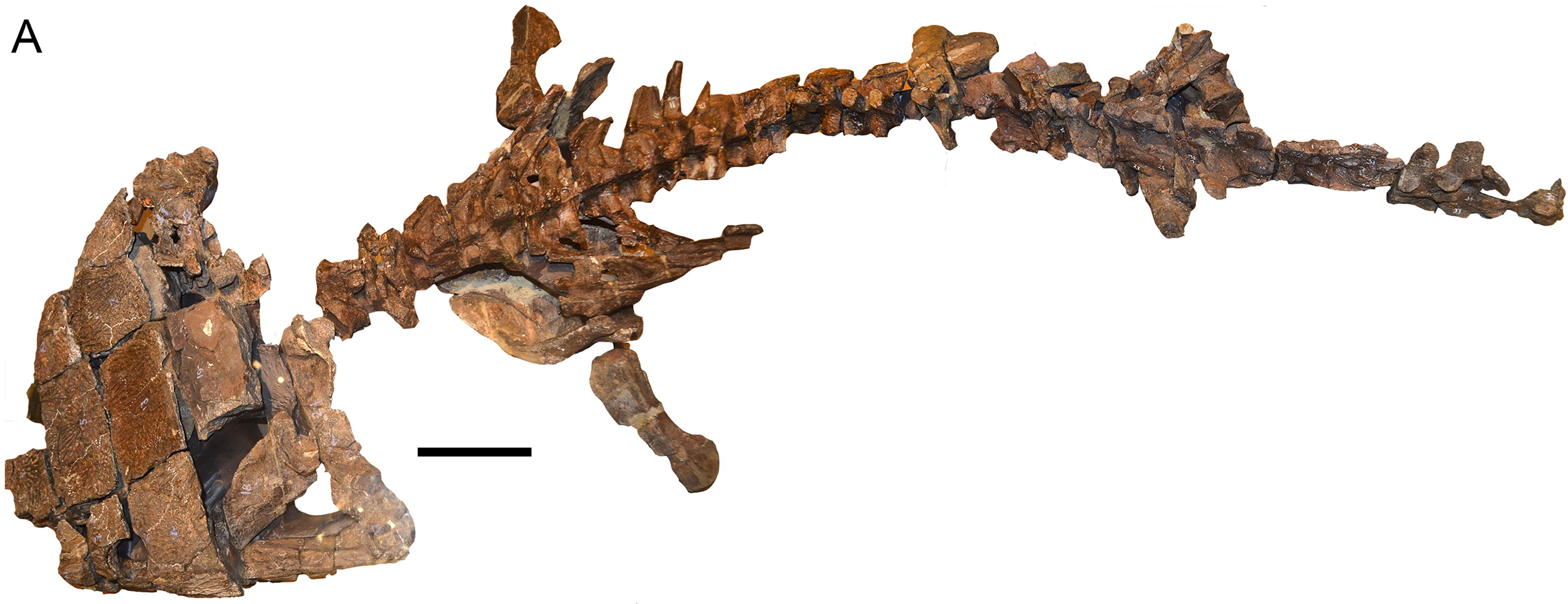
- Holotype skeleton

Scientific classification
- Kingdom: Animalia
- Phylum: Chordata
- Clade: Tetrapoda
- Order: †Temnospondyli
- Suborder: †Stereospondyli
- Family: †Chigutisauridae
- Genus: †Siderops; Warren and Hutchinson, 1983
- Species: †S. kehli

Binomial name
- †Siderops kehli Warren and Hutchinson, 1983

= Siderops =

Siderops Temporal range: Early Jurassic, Late Toarcian ~176.6 Ma

Extinct genus of amphibians

Siderops (from the Greek sideros meaning "iron" and -ops meaning "face" ) is an extinct genus of chigutisaurid temnospondyl from Early Jurassic of Australia, containing the species S. kehli (named after the Kehl family of 'Kolane', Wandoan, Queensland where the fossil was found).

== Discovery ==
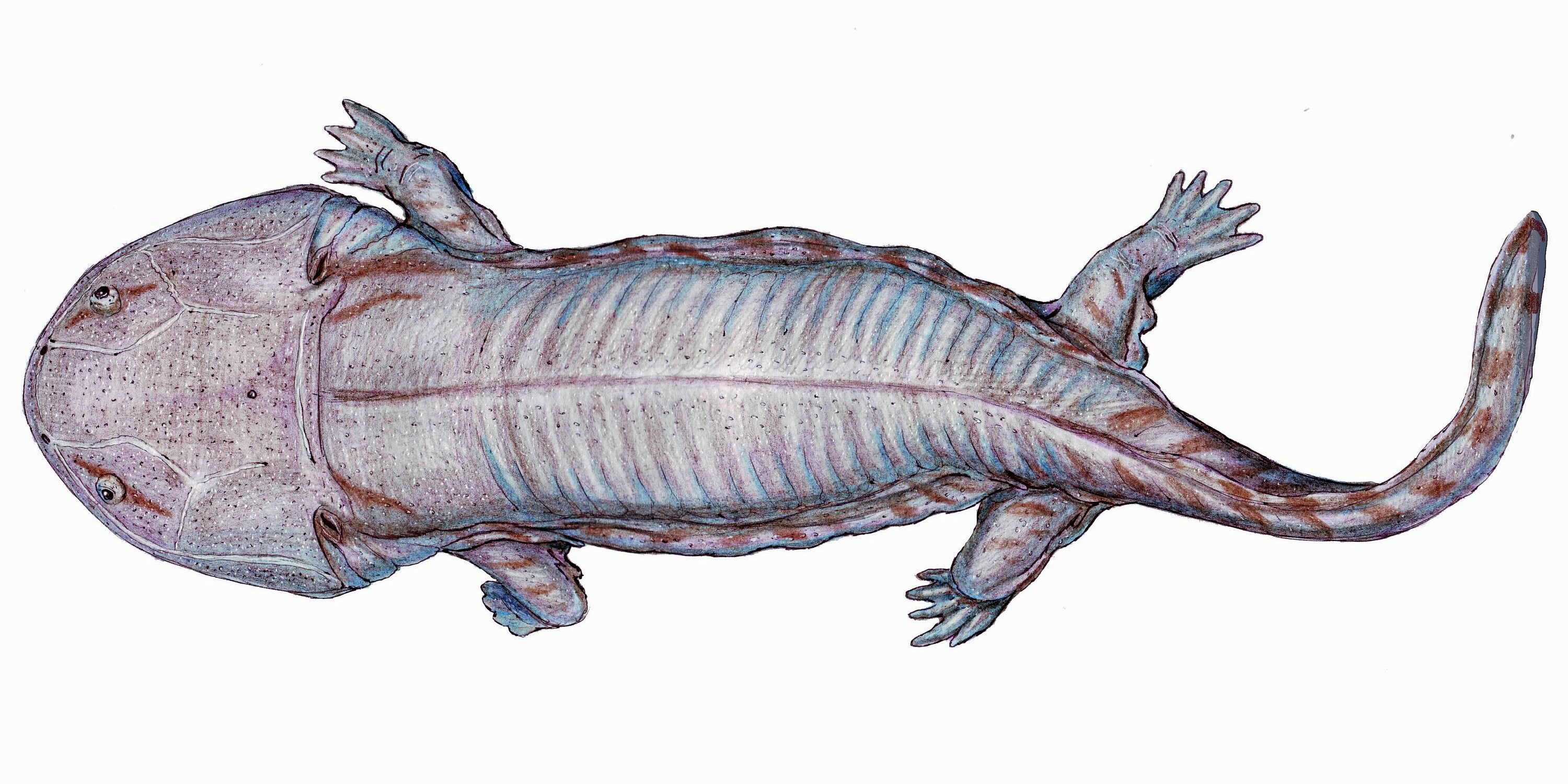
Life restoration

Size comparison to a human

It is solely known from the holotype specimen, which consists of a nearly complete skull with mandible and postcrania were found within the Westgrove Ironstone Member of the Evergreen Formation of the Surat Basin in Queensland. Dating to the late Toarcian at approximately 176.6 ma. Siderops was large, with a skull width 70 cm (28 in) wide and a total length of 2.6–2.7 m (8.5–8.9 ft).

== Classification ==
Siderops belongs to the clade Brachyopomorpha, a subdivision of the greater clade Temnospondyl and placed in the superfamily Brachyopoidea and belonging in the Chigutisauridae family. Shown below is a cladogram of Brachyopoidea adapted from Warren et al. (1983) and Ruta et al. (2007).

- Brachyopoidea
  - Brachyopidae
    - - Sinobrachyops
      - Xenobrachyops
    - - Banksiops
      - Batrachosaurus
      - - Vanastega
        - Vigilius
      - Batrachosuchus
  - Chigutisauridae
    - Chigutisaurus
    - - - Compsocerops
        - Kuttycephalus
      - - Pelorocephalus
        - Siderops
