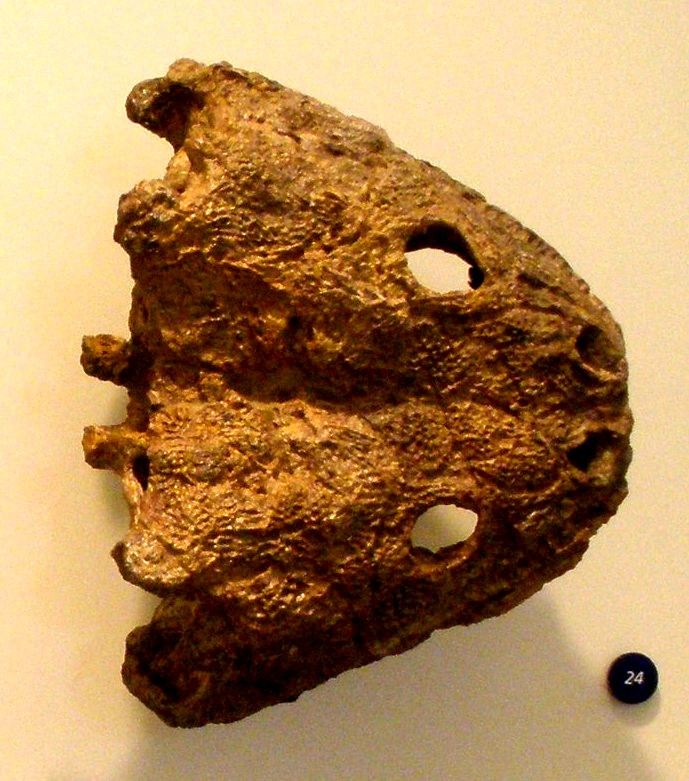
- Skull of Pelorocephalus mendozensis

Scientific classification
- Kingdom: Animalia
- Phylum: Chordata
- Clade: Tetrapoda
- Order: †Temnospondyli
- Suborder: †Stereospondyli
- Family: †Chigutisauridae
- Genus: †Pelorocephalus; Cabrera 1944

Type species
- Pelorocephalus mendozensis Cabrera 1944

Species
- †P. cacheutensis (Rusconi 1953) (originally Chigutisaurus cacheutensis); †P. ischigualastensis Bonaparte 1975; †P. mendozensis Cabrera 1944 (type); †P. tenax (Rusconi 1949) (originally Chigutisaurus tenax)

= Pelorocephalus =

Pelorocephalus Temporal range: Carnian

Extinct genus of amphibians

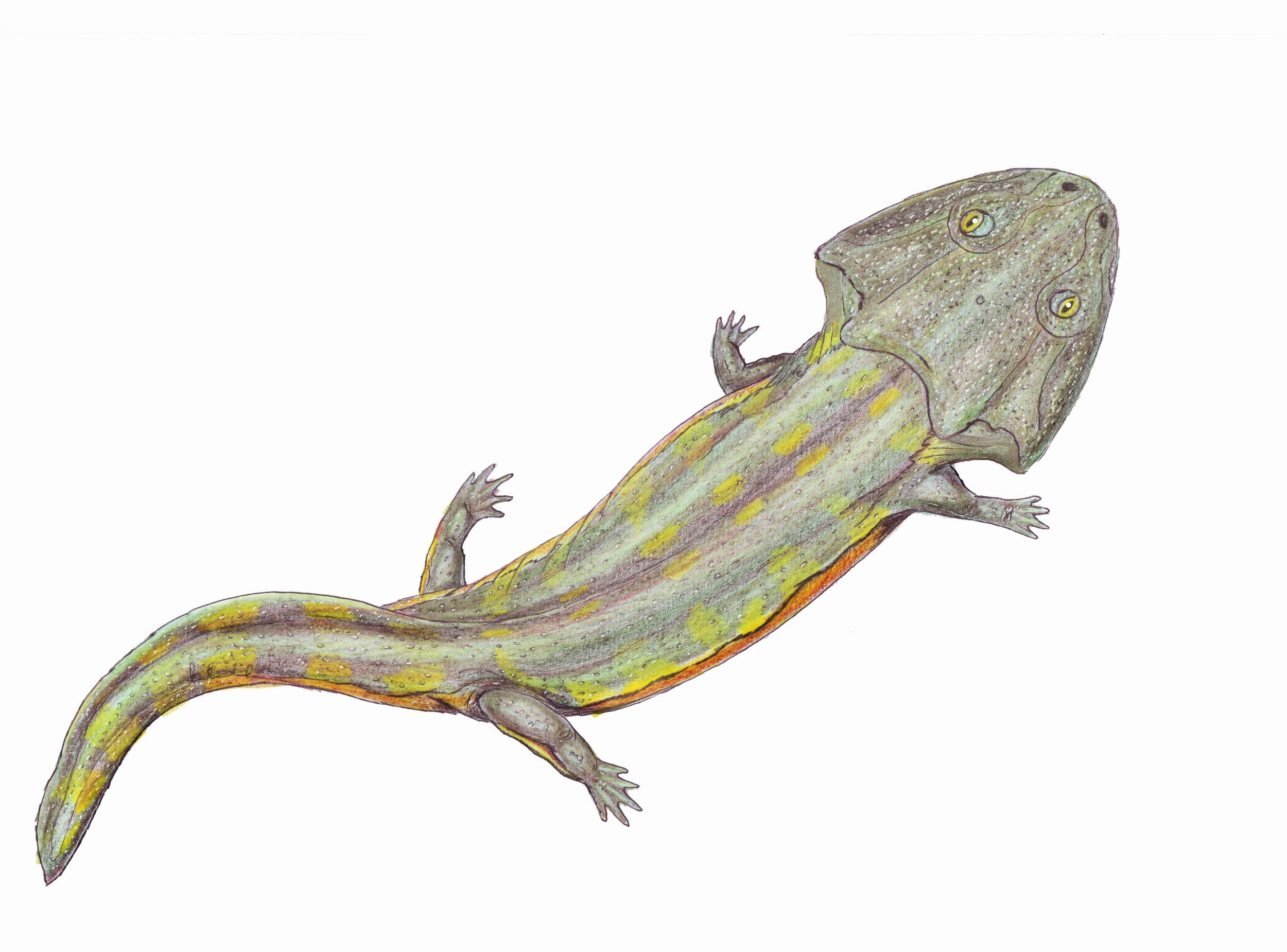
Life restoration of Pelorocephalus tenax

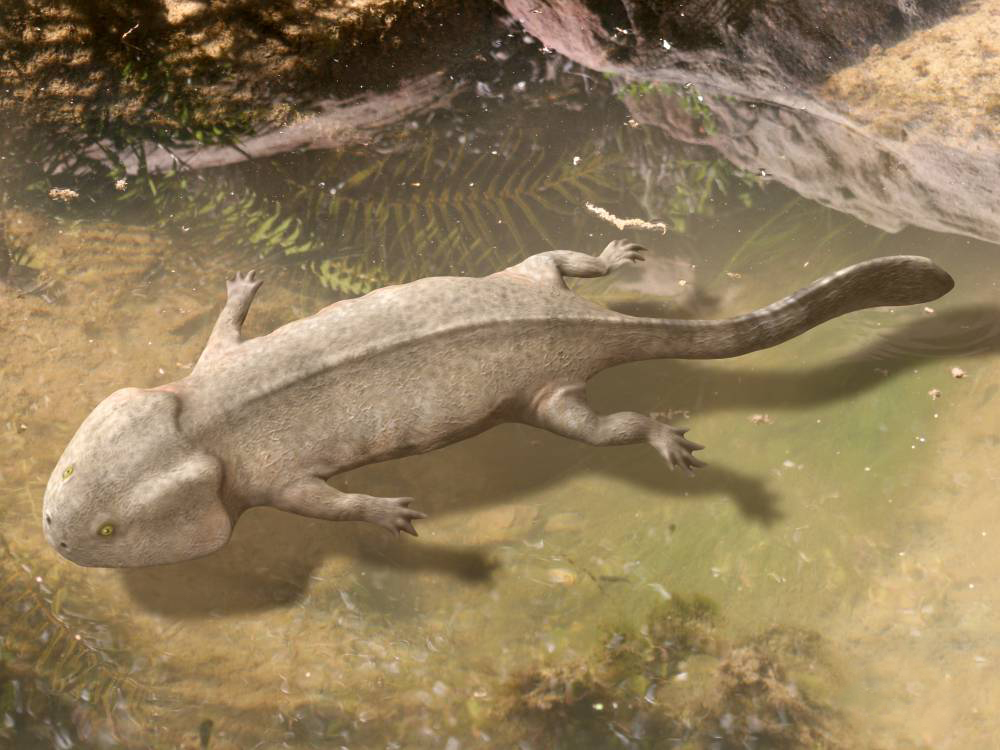
Life restoration of Pelorocephalus mendozensis

Pelorocephalus (meaning "monstrous head" in Greek) is an extinct genus of chigutisaurid temnospondyls. It is known from the Late Triassic (Carnian) Cacheutá Formation of the Cuyo Basin and the Ischigualasto Formation of the Ischigualasto-Villa Unión Basin, both in northwestern Argentina. Four species are currently recognized: the type species P. mendozensis, which was named in 1944, P. tenax, which was named in 1949 as a species of Chigutisaurus and reassigned to Pelorocephalus in 1999, and P. cacheutensis, which was named in 1953 as another species of Chigutisaurus and reassigned to Pelorocephalus along with P. tenax. A fourth species, P. ischigualastensis, was named in 1975 after the formation it was found in. The species P. tunuyanensis was named in 1948 but has since been synonymized with P. mendozensis.

== Phylogeny ==
Pelorocephalus in a cladogram of Brachyopoidea adapted from Ruta et al. (2007):

- Brachyopoidea
  - Brachyopidae
    - - Sinobrachyops
      - Xenobrachyops
    - - Banksiops
      - Batrachosaurus
      - - Vanastega
        - Vigilius
      - Batrachosuchus
  - Chigutisauridae
    - Chigutisaurus
    - - - Compsocerops
        - Kuttycephalus
      - - Pelorocephalus
        - Siderops
