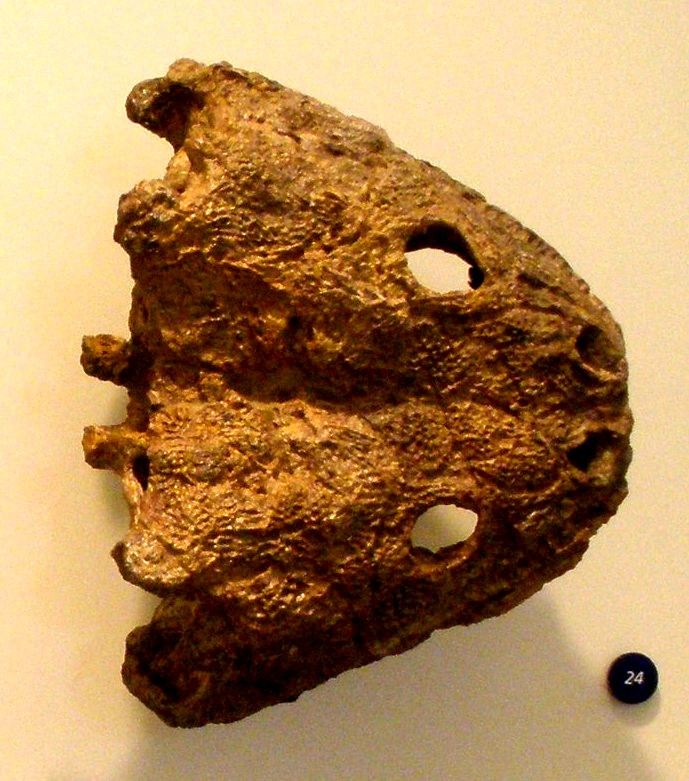
- Skull of the brachyopoid Pelorocephalus mendozensis

Scientific classification
- Kingdom: Animalia
- Phylum: Chordata
- Clade: Tetrapoda
- Order: †Temnospondyli
- Suborder: †Stereospondyli
- Clade: †Brachyopomorpha
- Superfamily: †Brachyopoidea; Lydekker, 1885

Families
- Brachyopidae; Chigutisauridae

= Brachyopoidea =

Brachyopoidea Temporal range: Early Triassic - Early Cretaceous, 252.3–120 Ma

Extinct superfamily of temnospondyls

Brachyopoidea is a superfamily of temnospondyls that lived during the Mesozoic. It contains the families Brachyopidae and Chigutisauridae. The earliest records of brachyopids are from the Lower Triassic in Australia. The latest-surviving member of the superfamily is the chigutisaurid Koolasuchus from the Early Cretaceous of Australia.

== Description ==
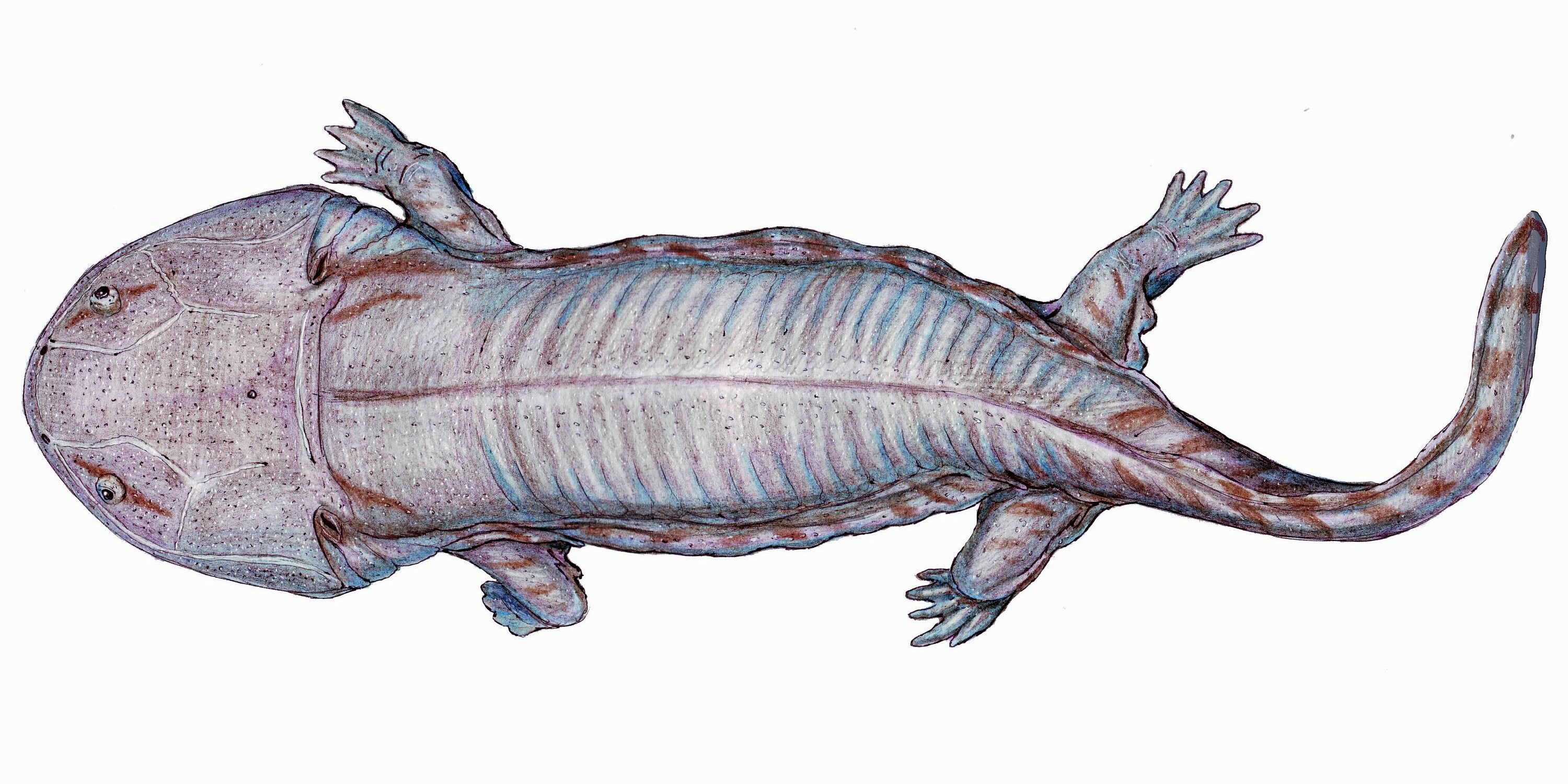
Restoration of the chigutisaurid Siderops kehli

Some large brachiopoids, such as Siderops and Koolasuchus, grew to lengths of around 2.5 metres (8.2 ft). However, an unnamed Late Triassic or Early Jurassic brachiopoid from Lesotho in southern Africa is estimated to have been far larger. At an estimated 7 metres (23 ft), the brachiopoid from Lesotho is one of the largest amphibians sensu lato^{[a]} ever known. This estimate is based on a single jaw fragment found in 1970 by a French expedition near Alwynskop in Quthing.

Because of its size, the fragment was initially considered to be from a mastodonsaur. However, Several features of the specimen indicate that it is from a brachyopoid. There is a large tusk protruding from the ectopterygoid, a bone of the palate, and the dental morphology is similar to that of other brachyopoids. When viewed from the side, the upper margin of the jaw appears concave. The specimen was redescribed as a brachyopoid in 2005.

== Classification ==
Shown below is a cladogram of Brachyopoidea adapted from Ruta et al. (2007).

- Brachyopoidea
  - Brachyopidae
    - - Sinobrachyops
      - Xenobrachyops
    - - Banksiops
      - Batrachosaurus
      - - Vanastega
        - Vigilius
      - Batrachosuchus
  - Chigutisauridae
    - Chigutisaurus
    - - - Compsocerops
        - Kuttycephalus
      - - Pelorocephalus
        - Siderops

== Notes ==
1. Amphibians in the most general sense- i.e. terrestrial or semi-terrestrial vertebrates which do not belong to Amniota.

== General references ==
- Dong, Z. (1985). "The Dashanpu Dinosaur Fauna of Zigong Sichuan Short Report V - Labyrinthodont Amphibia". Vertebrata PalAsiatica. 23: 301–306.
- Marsicano, Claudia A. (2005). "A new temnospondyl record from the Upper Triassic of Argentina". Ameghiniana. 42 (2): 501–504. ISSN 0002-7014. Archived from the original on 2017-11-15.
- Shishkin, M.A. (1991). "A Late Jurassic labyrinthodont from Mongolia". Paleontological Journal. 1991: 78–91.
- Warren, A. A.; Marsicano, C. (2000). "A phylogeny of the Brachyopoidea (Temnospondyli, Stereospondyli)". Journal of Vertebrate Paleontology. 20 (3): 462–483. doi:10.1671/0272-4634(2000)020[0462:APOTBT]2.0.CO;2. hdl:11336/93649. S2CID 86107783.
- Yates, A.M.; Warren, A.A. (2000). "The phylogeny of the 'higher' temnospondyls (Vertebrata: Choanata) and its implications for the monophyly and origins of the Sterospondyli". Zoological Journal of the Linnean Society. 128: 77–121. doi:10.1111/j.1096-3642.2000.tb00650.x.
- "Labyrinthodon". Paleofile. Archived from the original on December 29, 2017.
- "Pelorocephalus". Palaeos. Archived from the original on September 25, 2021.
- "Brachyopoidea". Palaeos. Archived from the original on May 15, 2008.
- J. Sébastien Steyer (May 2005). "A giant brachyopoid temnospondyl from the Upper Triassic or Lower Jurassic of Lesotho". Bulletin de la Société Géologique de France. 176 (3): 243–248. doi:10.2113/176.3.243.
- "Brachyopomorpha - Brachyopoids, Chigutisaurids and relatives". Mikko's Phylogeny Archive. Archived from the original on August 23, 2007.
- "A 2 m-long amphibian from Triassic rocks of southern New Zealand". Geology, University of Otago, New Zealand. Archived from the original on April 28, 2008.
