= Bathignathus =

Bathignathus Temporal range: Early Triassic

Scientific classification
- Kingdom: Animalia
- Phylum: Chordata
- Clade: Tetrapoda
- Order: †Temnospondyli
- Suborder: †Stereospondyli
- Family: †Brachyopidae
- Genus: †Bathignathus; Damiani and Jeannot, 2002

Type species
- †Batrachosuchus watsonii Haughton, 1925

Species
- † B. poikilops Damiani and Jeannot, 2002; † B. watsonii (Haughton, 1925)

Extinct genus of amphibians

Bathignathus is an extinct genus of amphibians containing the species Bathignathus watsonii and B. poikilops. Its first known specimen, thought to represent a new species of Batrachosuchus, was described in 1919 and assigned a specific epithet in 1925. The genus Bathignathus was erected in 2002 with the discovery of additional fossils. It is known from multiple skull remains dated from the Early to possibly Middle Triassic. Some of its distinctive features include subdued otic notches (depressed regions of the roof of the amphibian skull) and eye sockets that are extremely close to the front of the skull. The genus was assigned to the family Brachyopidae in the order Temnospondyli. The Cynognathus Assemblage Zone, from which Bathignathus was recovered, has yielded diverse remains of amphibians and other species.

== History of discovery ==
The holotype of Bathignathus was described as a new species of Batrachosuchus by the palaeontologist D. M. S. Watson in 1919. The species was not assigned a name. The type locality of the specimen, which was held by the British Museum (Natural History) under the accession number R. 3589, was reported as "Cynognathus beds, Cape Province, South Africa". Watson clarified in 1956 that there was no record of the specimen's origin but that it "almost certainly came from the Cynognathus zone of the Burghersdorp district" (now the Eastern Cape province), which is Early to Middle Triassic in age. In a 1925 catalogue of amphibians of the Karoo Supergroup, Sidney H. Haughton wrote that he agreed that Watson's specimen represented a new species, and he recommended the name Batrachosuchus watsonii.

In 2002, Ross J. Damiani and Ashleigh M. Jeannot erected the new genus Bathignathus, with B. watsonii as the type species. The genus name comes from the Greek words bathys (lit. 'deep') and gnathos (lit. 'jaw'), in reference to the deep jaws of brachyopids (members of the family to which Bathignathus was assigned). They described a second Bathignathus species in their paper, B. poikilops. The holotype of B. poikilops (held by the Bernard Price Institute for Palaeontological Research under the accession number BP/1/5790) was recovered from Driefontein, a farm in northeastern Free State, South Africa, and identified with the lower Cynognathus Assemblage Zone (dated to the Olenekian of the Early Triassic). Its specific epithet comes from the Greek words poikilos (lit. 'mottled') and opsis (lit. 'face'), referencing the mottled colour of the specimen. Damiani and Jeannot wrote that their decision to assign B. poikilops to the genus Bathignathus was a tentative one, partially because they felt the material they had was too limited to use as a basis for a new genus.

== Description ==
The holotype of Bathignathus consists of a skull described by Watson as "perfectly preserved". Its distinctive features include heavily subdued otic notches (depressed regions of the roof of the amphibian skull) and eye sockets that are extremely close to the front of the skull (to the extent of affecting related bones). The prefrontal bones make up a small portion of the edge of the eye sockets, and they themselves are bordered by the nasal bones and maxillae (bones of the upper jaw). The nostrils are largely defined by the nasal bones, which comprise a substantial part of their inner walls, meeting with the premaxillae towards the front. The maxillae meet with the edge of the nasal bones, but they do not connect to the nostrils at all; they are blocked by what Watson tentatively identified as lacrimal bones (small bones just in front of the eye socket).

Watson remarked on the existence of a canal extending from the part of the maxilla near the eye socket and ending with a small foramen (a gap to allow for the passage of soft tissue) behind the junction of the maxillae with the nasal bone and lacrimal bone. He wrote that the canal "no doubt" represented a nasolacrimal duct (tear duct), something that had not been observed in any fossil amphibian except Micropholis. The lacrimal bones form the outer border of the nostrils, connecting with the nasal bones, maxillae, premaxillae (bones at the tip of the upper jaw), and smaller bones Watson identified as possibly representing septomaxillae (bones associated with the nasal opening). The possible septomaxillae connect to the premaxillae and lacrimal bones. Watson attributed his uncertainty regarding their identity to the (in his opinion, less likely) possibility that they were instead part of the prevomers (bones comprising part of the palate).

The parasphenoid (a bone in the middle of the palate) is large and forms a broad knifelike shape. Its bottom surface is roughly flat, but its sides are angled downwards. It widens to form a broad plate near the pterygoid bones (another part of the palate), connecting with them and the exoccipitals (part of the braincase), and it extends to the back of the skull. Watson described the pterygoid bones as unusual, writing that they extend outwards as flat plates and develop into descending rims at a nearly vertical angle. The rims cover the inner surfaces of the quadrate bones (of the back of the skull) and form edges parallel to similar edges of the squamosal bones (also part of the back of the skull). The front ends of the pterygoid bones connect with either the ectopterygoid or palatine bone (both associated with the roof of the mouth); Watson was unable to say with certainty due to a break on both sides of the skull.

The palatine bones, each of which hold one large tooth, form part of the border of the nasal cavity on their frontal ends and meet with the prevomers. The prevomers are mostly covered by matrix; they also each carry one tooth and partially comprise the border of the nasal cavity. They partially cover the lower and outer edges of the frontal part of the parasphenoid. The parasphenoid in turn partially covers the exoccipitals (of the back of the skull), the latter of which form large condyles (rounded protrusions). The exoccipitals have significant contact with the pterygoid bones, and they together form the bottom of the middle ear cavity. Above the condyles of the exoccipitals lies the supraoccipital. The exoccipitals preserve three foramina: a small one for a vein, another small one for the hypoglossal nerve, and a large one for the vagus nerve.

Watson described the triangular quadrate bones as "remarkable". The inner face of each is covered by the pterygoid bone, while the frontal face is slightly convex and faces the infratemporal fossa (a muscle-containing cavity of the skull). The third face is concave and covered from above by the squamosal bone and from below by the quadratojugal bone (in the lower back corner of the skull), the latter of which also covers some of the frontal face. The quadrate ends in an almost hemispherical condyle. The squamosal bones, which are intersected by a small foramen, extend from the tabular bones (of the back of the skull) to the quadratojugal bones, in between which they develop a triangular form. Their back surfaces are concave and their inner margins form edges parallel to those of the pterygoid bones. These two sets of bones are separated by the rear edges of the quadrate bones.

The columellae (bones of the middle ear) are large, their outer borders lying close to the inner sides of the squamosal bones, with which they are parallel. Watson proposed that the two columellae and squamosal bones were united by ligaments, as is the case in many living salamanders. The inner ends of the columellae are rounded and located in the fenestra vestibuli (the passage from the middle to the inner ear). Further along, their upper surfaces flatten and develop into a large, flat plate marking their outer ends. The border between the inner and outer parts of the bones is marked by a deep groove on the upper surface, which Watson proposed would have held a stapedial artery.

The holotype of Bathignathus poikilops consists of partial skull remains (roof and back portions); Damiani and Jeannot also identified a right mandibular ramus (the upward extending part of the mandible). The researchers wrote that of the traits they used as their basis for erecting the genus Bathignathus, those of B. poikilops are almost identical to those B. watsonii, except the former's narrower sensory canals and lack of a vertical sulcus (furrow) on the back of the skull. However, B. poikilops possesses some other features unique not only within Bathignathus but among brachyopids in general. These include extremely large outer nostrils with smaller corresponding internal nostrils and the following combination of characteristics of the mandible: a large outer wall of the adductor fossa (space for the muscle associated with the movement of the jaw); a large foramen behind the mandibular symphysis (a ridge in the middle of the mandible); a ridge on the back of the coronoid process (a thin triangular projection of the mandible); no teeth on the coronoid process; and a foraman behind Meckel's cartilage bordered by only be the postsplenial and prearticular (bones of the mandible). Of these, the latter two appear to be autapomorphies (unique traits) of B. poikilops.

== Classification ==
Damiani and Jeannot placed Bathignathus in the family Brachyopidae of the ancient amphibian order Temnospondyli. A 2019 phylogenetic study of early tetrapods selected Bathignathus as its only representative of the superfamily Brachyopoidea. The genus was placed closest to the three plagiosaurids included in the study: Compsocerops, Gerrothorax, and Plagiosuchus.

== Palaeoecology ==
The Cynognathus Assemblage Zone can be divided into three subzones; Bathignathus poikilops was recovered from the earliest. This subdivision, known as the Langbergia-Garjainia Subzone, was established on the basis of its high prevalence of remains of the temnospondyl Kestrosaurus. Most of its fossils were deposited in lacustrine muds and silts, with commonly found fossils including isolated bone fragments and coprolites. In addition to several species of amphibians, the subzone has yielded remains of fish, synapsids, and reptiles.

== See also ==
- List of prehistoric amphibian genera
