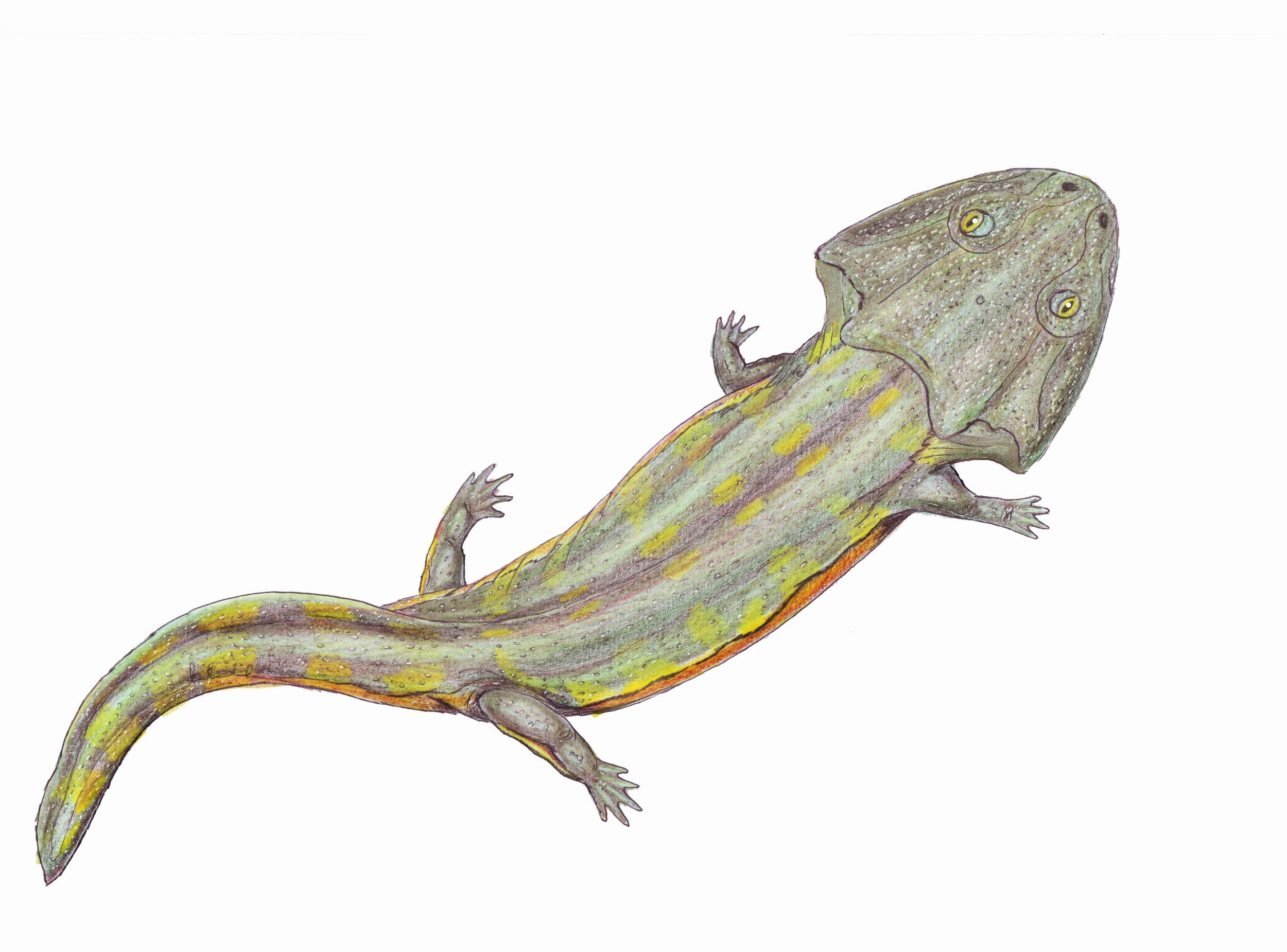
- Pelorocephalus tenax

Scientific classification
- Domain: Eukaryota
- Kingdom: Animalia
- Phylum: Chordata
- Order: †Temnospondyli
- Suborder: †Stereospondyli
- Clade: †Trematosauria
- Clade: †Brachyopomorpha; Warren and Marsicano, 2000

Genera and superfamilies
- †Bothriceps; †Keratobrachyops; †Brachyopoidea

= Brachyopomorpha =

Brachyopomorpha Temporal range: Early Triassic - Middle Cretaceous, 252.3–120 Ma

Extinct clade of amphibians

Brachyopomorpha is a clade of stereospondyl temnospondyls within the infraorder Trematosauria. It was constructed in 2000 to include Bothriceps australis and the superfamily Brachyopoidea. It is phylogenetically defined as a stem-based taxon including Pelorocephalus and all taxa closer to it than to Rhytidosteus. In contrast, Brachyopoidea is defined as a node-based taxon including Brachyops and Pelorocephalus and all descendants of their most recent common ancestor. Because Bothriceps is not thought to be a descendant of that recent common ancestor and would be more basal than it, the genus is placed just outside Brachyopoidea and is considered to be a sister taxon to the clade.

Cladogram of Brachyopomorpha

- Brachyopomorpha
  - - Bothriceps
    - Keratobrachyops
  - Brachyopoidea
    - Brachyopidae
    - Chigutisauridae

Damiani and Kitching, 2003

Bothriceps was once considered to be a brachyopid within Brachyopoidea, but is now placed on the brachyopoid stem closer to Brachyopoidea than to Rhytidosteidae due to the presence of several plesiomorphies (ancestral characters). The probable presence of a tabular horn in Bothriceps also suggests that it is a basal brachyopomorph rather than a brachyopid.

Keratobrachyops, once assigned to Chigutisauridae, is now thought to be a basal brachyopomorph closely related to Bothriceps.
