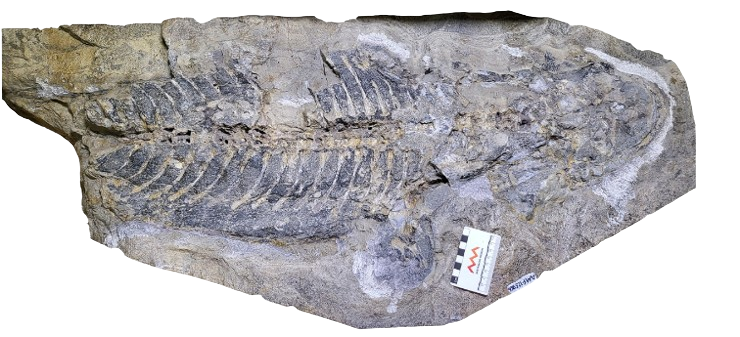
- Holotype of Arenaerpeton supinatus

Scientific classification
- Kingdom: Animalia
- Phylum: Chordata
- Clade: Tetrapoda
- Order: †Temnospondyli
- Suborder: †Stereospondyli
- Family: †Chigutisauridae
- Genus: †Arenaerpeton; Hart et al., 2023

Type species
- †Arenaerpeton supinatus Hart et al., 2023

= Arenaerpeton =

Arenaerpeton Temporal range: Early-Mid Triassic, ~252–237 Ma

Extinct genus of amphibians

Arenaerpeton is an extinct genus of chigutisaurid temnospondyl found in the Terrigal Formation of New South Wales, Australia. The type species is A. supinatus. The genus name is derived from the Latin "arena", meaning "sand" (a reference to the sandstone block in which the holotype was found); and "erpeton" meaning thing that creeps (commonly used in fossil amphibians). The species name "supinatus" means "supine", referring to the fact that the fossil is lying on its back.

== Discovery and naming ==
The holotype, AM F125866, a skull and partial skeleton, originated from the Kincumber Quarry, where the Terrigal Formation is present.

In October 1996, Mihail Mihaildis, a retired chicken farmer, purchased a large slab weighing roughly 1,450 kilograms (3,200 lb) for use in the construction of a garden retaining wall at his private property in Umina Beach, New South Wales. While landscaper David King was cleaning the rocks, he discovered the holotype specimen of Arenaerpeton supinatus. The holotype specimen was found in 60 centimetres (24 in) to 80 centimetres (31 in) of surrounding quartz-rich sandstone.

Shortly after, Mihaildis contacted the Australian Museum, Sydney about the discovery and in 1997, it was put on display at the "Dinosaur World Tour", a Canadian touring exhibition, which was showing in Sydney at the time. One of the describers of the specimen, Lachlan Hart, saw the specimen while it was on display in 1997 at the age of twelve. The fossil was eventually donated to the Australian Museum in 2000.

In c. 2020, shortly before it was described, the holotype was taken to the facilities of the Australian Border Force so a more complete view of the skeleton could be seen by using X-ray scanners normally reserved for the inspection of cargo. Despite this, there was insufficient difference in X-ray attenuation between the fossil and the surrounding matrix, possibly due to the similar density between the quartz and the apatite of the fossil, or due to the low quantity of surviving bone.

Arenaerpeton supinatus was then named and described by Hart et al. (2023).

== Description ==
The length of Arenaerpeton was calculated to be 1.2 metres (3.9 ft); the surviving section of the holotype measures around 94 centimetres (37 in) long.

== Classification ==
Arenaerpeton is placed in the family Chigutisauridae as the sister taxon to Kuttycephalus and Compsocerops.

== See also ==
- Prehistoric amphibian
- List of prehistoric amphibians
