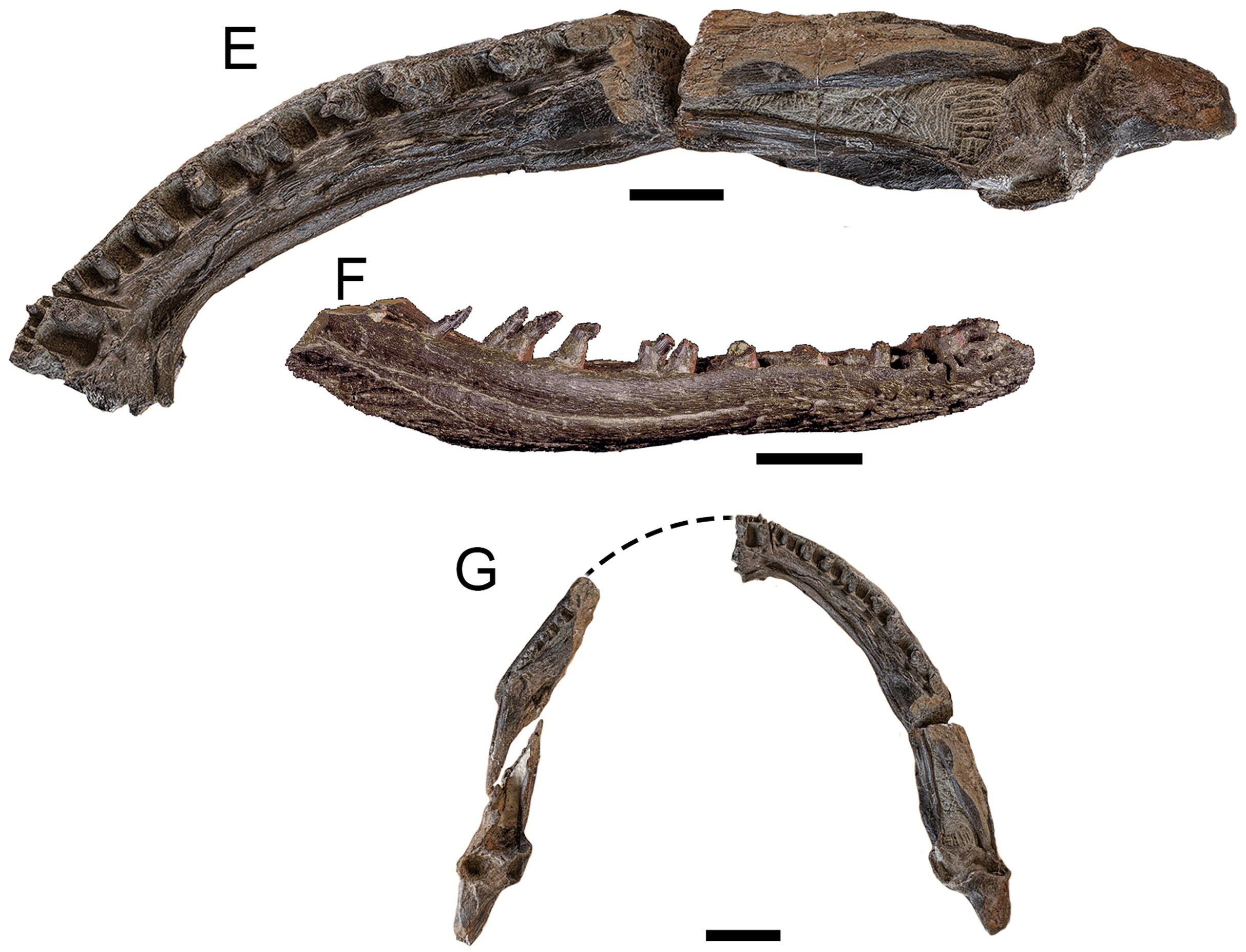
- Holotype mandibles

Scientific classification
- Kingdom: Animalia
- Phylum: Chordata
- Clade: Tetrapoda
- Order: †Temnospondyli
- Suborder: †Stereospondyli
- Family: †Chigutisauridae
- Genus: †Koolasuchus; Warren et al., 1997

Type species
- †Koolasuchus cleelandi Warren et al., 1997

= Koolasuchus =

Koolasuchus Temporal range: Early Cretaceous (Barremian–Aptian), 125–120 Ma

Extinct genus of amphibians

Koolasuchus is an extinct genus of brachyopoid temnospondyl in the family Chigutisauridae. Fossils have been found in the Wonthaggi Formation in Victoria, Australia and date back to 125–120 million years ago during the Barremian and Aptian stages of the Early Cretaceous, making Koolasuchus the youngest known temnospondyl (excluding modern amphibians, which may be descended from temnospondyls). It is known from several fragments of the skull and other bones such as vertebrae, ribs, and pectoral elements. The type species Koolasuchus cleelandi was named in 1997. K. cleelandi was adopted as the fossil emblem for the state of Victoria, Australia on 13 January 2022.

== History ==
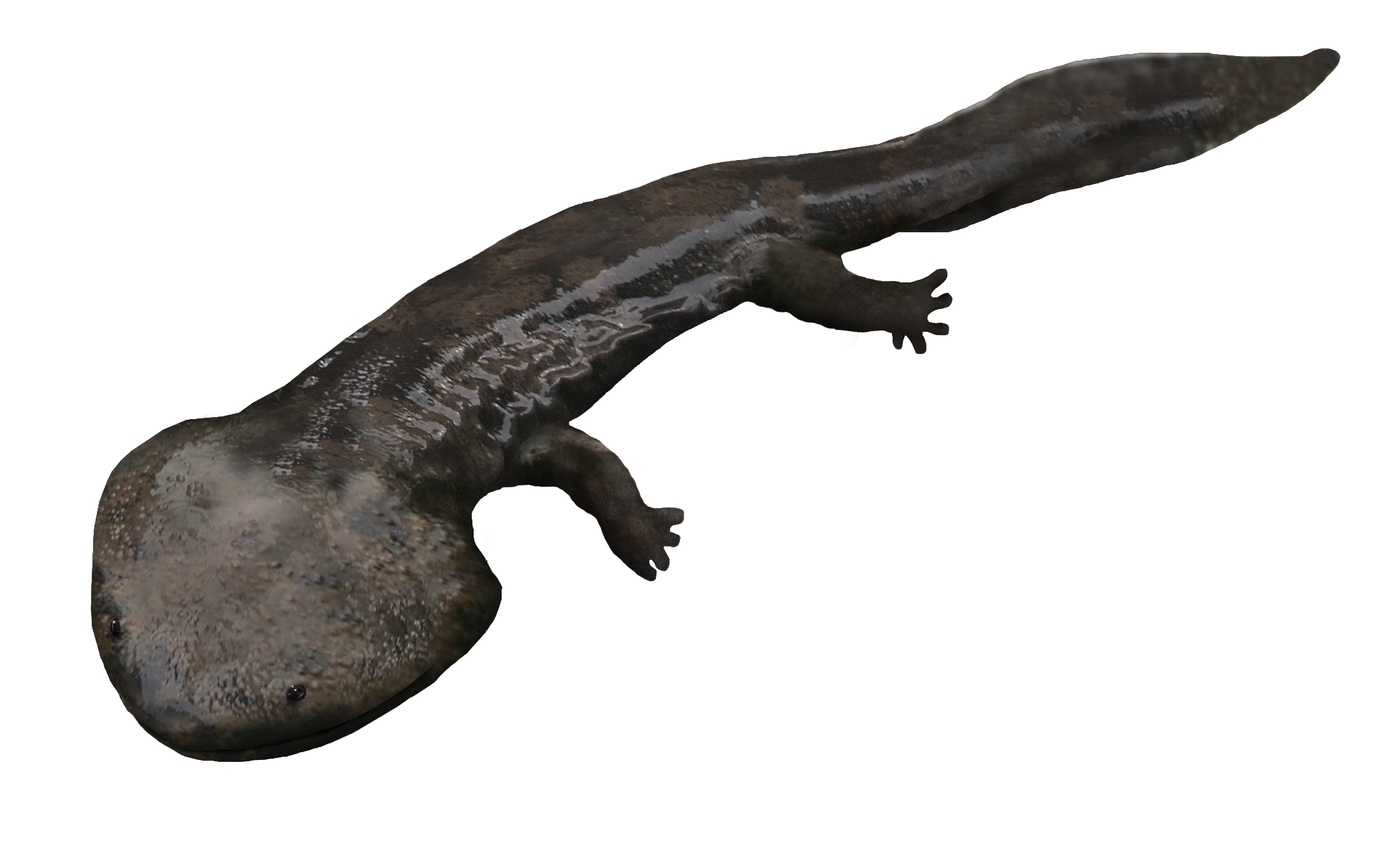
Life restoration

Between 1978 and 1979, a fossil expedition by the National Museum of Victoria explored fossiliferous outcrops belonging to the Strzelecki Group in Kilcunda, Victoria, Australia. In 1979 during the expedition, a pair of incomplete mandibles (lower jaws) of an unidentified tetrapod was unearthed from strata deriving from the upper Barremian-aged Wonthaggi Formation at a site dubbed "Rowells Beach". This specimen was then deposited at the National Museum of Victoria under catalog number NMV P186213 along with many other fossils unearthed during the expedition. In 1982, paleontologists Timothy Flannery and Thomas Rich briefly mentioned the discovery in an article where they hypothesized that the mandibles could belong to an ornithischian dinosaur, a crocodilian, or a labyrinthodont amphibian. The uncertainty of this specimen's taxonomy led it to be nicknamed GOK, which stands for "God Only Knows". In 1986, a publication by Anne Warren and R. Jupp described the specimen in more detail where they disproved that it could belong to a crocodilian or an ornithischian. However, they did not definitively identify it as that of a temnospondyl due to the Cretaceous age of the specimen, one much younger than any other known temnospondyl specimen at the time. In early 1989, Lesley Kool collected a temnospondyl intercentrum (part of the vertebra), NMV-PI86040, from a site known as Potters Hill Road nearby where NMV P186213 was discovered. Another temnospondyl bone, a fragment from the skull roof cataloged under NMV-PI86101, was found by Mike Cleeland on a beach in San Remo. In 1991, these specimens were described by A. A. Warren and colleagues as being unquestionable evidence that temnospondyls were present in the Strzelecki Group. The morphology of the skull roof lead to the authors suggesting that the temnospondyl was either a member of Plagiosauridae or Brachyopoidea.

In 1997, Australian paleontologists Anne Warren, Thomas Rich, and Patricia Vickers-Rich redescribed all previously mentioned temnospondyl material from the Strzelecki Group along with additional postcranial fossils and jaw fragments. In their redescription, Warren and colleagues described the incomplete mandibles, NMV P186213, as the holotype (name-bearing) specimen of a new genus and species of temnospondyl, named Koolasuchus cleelandi. The generic name Koolasuchus is in honor of Lesley Kool, the discoverer of the intercentrum, and the Greek word souchos, meaning "crocodile" in reference to the crocodilian-like body shapes of temnospondyls. The specific name cleelandi is in honor of Mike Cleeland, the discoverer of a skull roof fragment of Koolasuchus. Several partial skulls have been referred to Koolasuchus since its description, however they remain undescribed and are located in the collections of the National Victoria Museum.

== Description ==
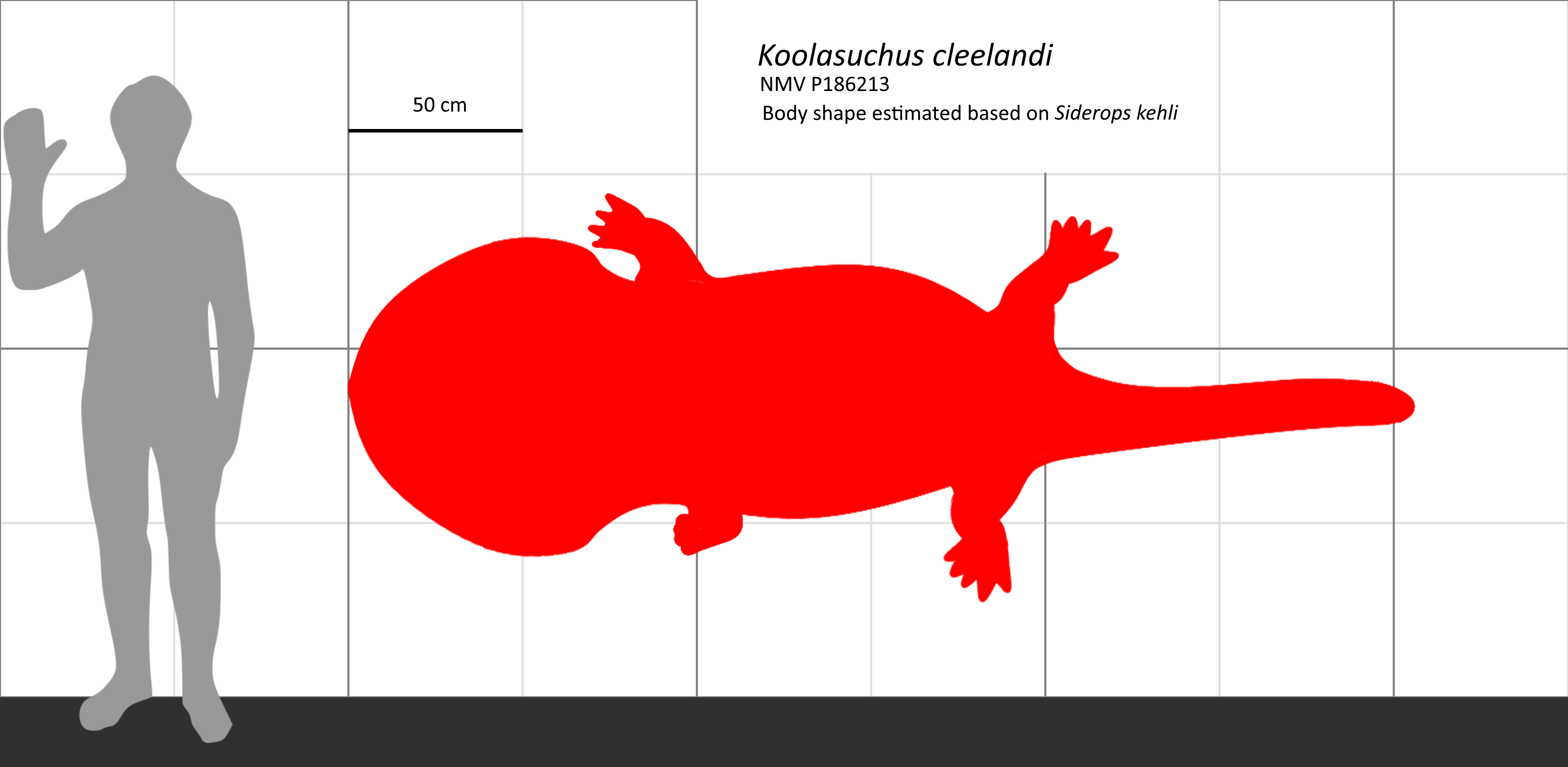
Size estimation of Koolasuchus based on Siderops

Koolasuchus was a large, aquatic temnospondyl, measuring up to 3 metres (9.8 ft) in length and weighing up to 500 kilograms (1,100 lb). Like other chigutisaurids, it had a wide, rounded head and tabular horns projecting from the back of the skull. Although represented by incomplete material, the skull was likely 65 centimetres (26 in) long.

=== Anatomy ===
Although more complete skull material has been mentioned in literature, no full-length descriptions of Koolasuchus' skull have been published. However, several tentatively-assigned cranial fragments have been described, including: two pterygoids, a right prefrontal, and an ectopterygoid (a part of the pterygoid that links it to the outer part of the skull). The right prefrontal is incomplete, but bears a significant portion of the orbital margin. It was referred to Koolasuchus on the basis of its origin and its anatomy, which is similar to that of brachyopoids and plagiosaurs. As for the ectopterygoid, it does not bear characteristics of brachyopids and instead is more similar to those of chigutisaurids and Triassic temnospondyls.

Four mandibular ramii are from Koolasuchus are known. The postglenoid area, PGA, (where the mandible articulates with the skull) contains extensions of the prearticular and angular bones. The dorsal (top) surface of the PGA bears a suture that excludes the articular from being on the dorsal surface of the PGA, a characteristic distinguishing Koolasuchus from other temnospondyls aside from Siderops and Hadrokkosaurus. The dentary composes most of the labial (lipped) surface of the anterior mandible. The teeth of Koolasuchus are sharp, pointed, and serrated, adaptations for a carnivorous lifestyle. The teeth feature lance-shaped tips with keels on their mesial and distal surfaces, a condition similar to that of Siderops. Additionally, the teeth on the mandible are large at the base, proportionately large, and rounded, with 40 teeth present on the mandible. This tooth count is much higher than in other temnospondyls like Hadrokkosaurus and the indeterminate temnospondyl UCMP 36834. Koolasuchus is differentiated from Siderops and Hadrokkosaurus by its absence of coronoid teeth, teeth present on the coronoid process.

== Paleobiology ==
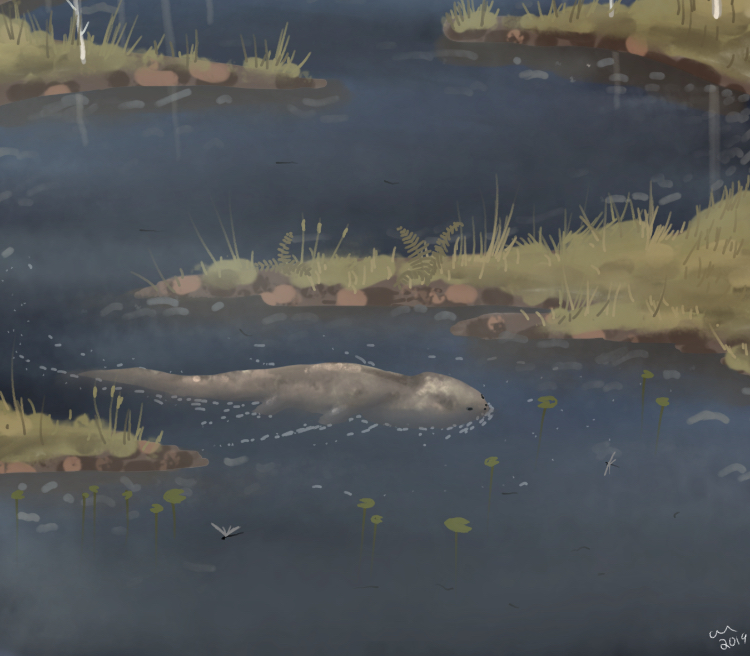
Restoration of Koolasuchus swimming through a stream of water

Koolasuchus inhabited rift valleys in southern Australia during the Early Cretaceous. During this time the area was below the Antarctic Circle, and temperatures were relatively cool for the Mesozoic. Based on the coarse-grained rocks in which remains were found, Koolasuchus likely lived in fast-moving streams. As a large aquatic predator, it was similar in lifestyle to crocodilians. Although eusuchians and kin were common during the Early Cretaceous, they were absent from southern Australia 120 million years ago, possibly because of the cold climate. By 110 Mya, represented by rocks in the Dinosaur Cove fossil locality, temperatures had warmed and crocodilians had returned to the area. These crocodilians likely displaced Koolasuchus, leading to its disappearance in younger rocks.
