= Blinasaurus =

Scientific classification
- Kingdom: Animalia
- Phylum: Chordata
- Clade: Tetrapoda
- Order: †Temnospondyli
- Suborder: †Stereospondyli
- Family: †Brachyopidae
- Genus: †Blinasaurus; Cosgriff, 1969

Extinct genus of amphibians

Blinasaurus is a name of an extinct genus of prehistoric brachyopid found in Triassic geological formations of Australia. The type species is Platyceps wilkinsonii Stephens, 1887. The genus was established by John W. Cosgriff in 1969 to incorporate the type, discovered in New South Wales, and the author's new fossil species, Blinasaurus henwoodi, describing type material found in Blina Shale in the Kimberley region of northwest Australia.

The genus was represented by three species, however, the type species (Platyceps wilkinsonii Stephens, 1887) was assigned to a new monotypic genus as Platycepsion wilkinsoni. A species described by Cosgriff in the same study was placed in a new combination as Batrachosuchus henwoodi.
