= Batrachosuchus henwoodi =

Scientific classification
- Kingdom: Animalia
- Phylum: Chordata
- Clade: Tetrapoda
- Order: †Temnospondyli
- Suborder: †Stereospondyli
- Family: †Brachyopidae
- Genus: †Batrachosuchus
- Species: †B. henwoodi

Binomial name
- †Batrachosuchus henwoodi John W. Cosgriff, 1969

Extinct species of amphibian

Batrachosuchus henwoodi is a fossil species of amphibian, first described as Blinasaurus henwoodi by John W. Cosgriff in 1969. The species was placed in a new generic combination when separating the genus Blinasaurus, currently subsumed as a synonym to the genus Platycepsion.
