= Surangular =

Bone of the lower jaw

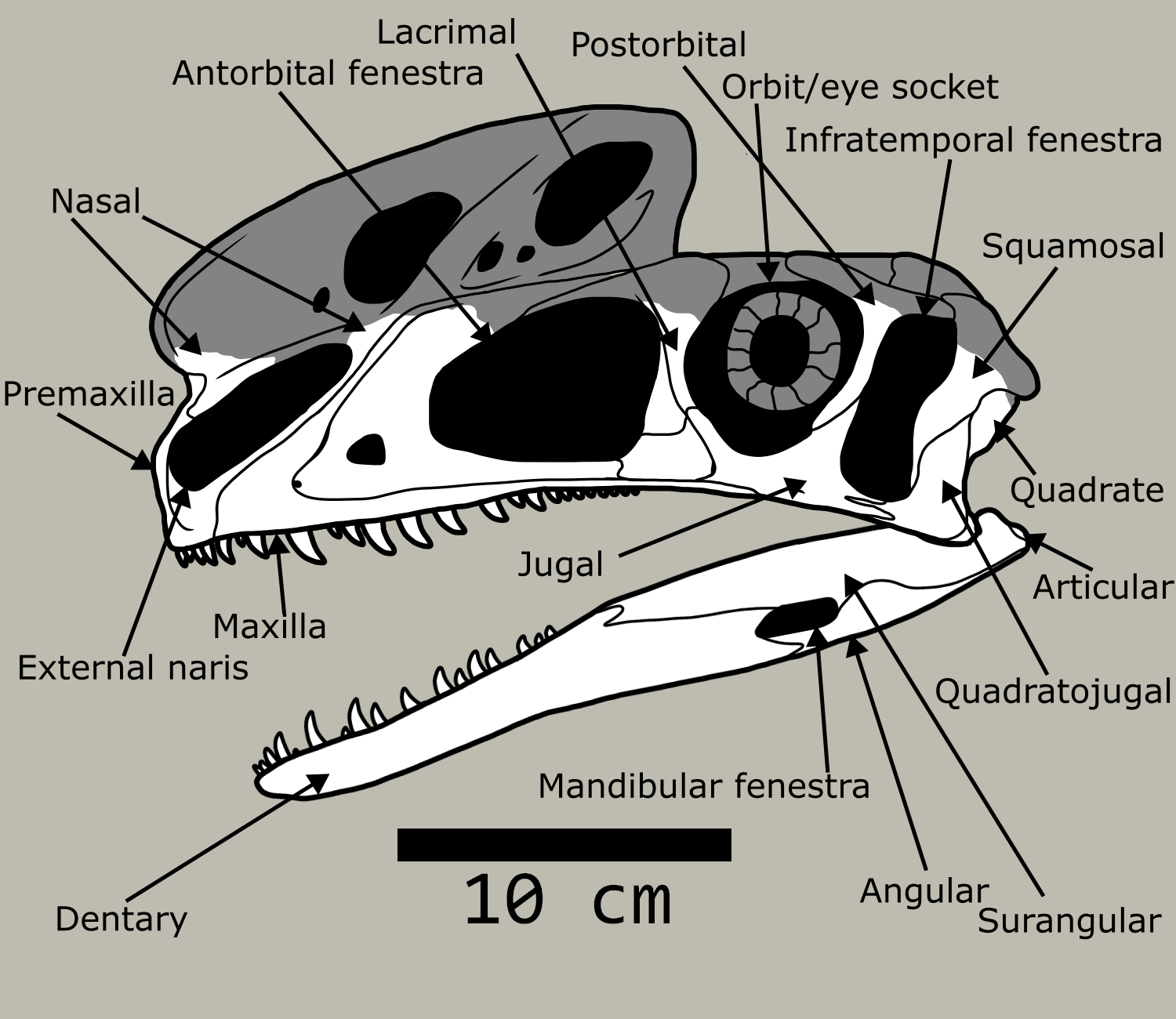
Skull diagram of the dinosaur Proceratosaurus, showing location of surangular

Skull and jaws diagram of the primitive synapsid Dimetrodon, showing location of surangular

The surangular (Note: Alternately spelled supra-angular, supraangular, suprangular, os supra-angulare, or surangulare.) is a jaw bone found in most land vertebrates, except mammals. The surangular makes up the upper portion of the back half of the outside of the lower jaw, behind the dentary, above the angular, and outside the articular. It is the main component of the outer wall of the adductor fossa, where the major jaw-closing muscles attach to the mandible.

The surangular is ancestrally the posteriormost in the series of infradentary bones, which line the outside of the mandible below and behind the dentary bone. It is also known as the fourth infradentary in early sarcopterygians, in which the infradentary series comprises four bones, the first being the splenial, the second the postsplenial, and third being the angular.

In archosaurs there is an opening, the external mandibular fenestra, found between the surangular, dentary, and angular.

In some eucynodonts, the surangular contacted the squamosal to form part of the jaw joint, a characteristic that historically had been interpreted as a predecessor of the dentary-squamosal joint of mammals. The surangular was reduced to a tiny splint as part of the evolution of mammalian auditory ossicles from other bones involved in the jaw joint, and absent in most mammals.
