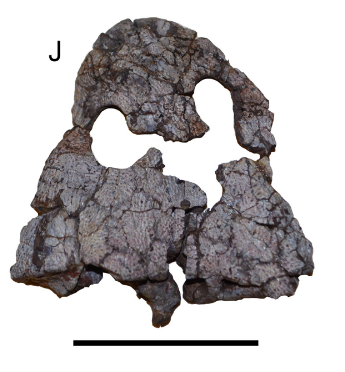
- Holotype skull of K. australis

Scientific classification
- Kingdom: Animalia
- Phylum: Chordata
- Clade: Tetrapoda
- Order: †Temnospondyli
- Suborder: †Stereospondyli
- Clade: †Brachyopomorpha
- Genus: †Keratobrachyops; Warren, 1981

Type species
- †Keratobrachyops australis Warren, 1981

= Keratobrachyops =

Keratobrachyops Temporal range: Lowermost Late Triassic (Carnian) ~236 Ma

Extinct genus of amphibians

Keratobrachyops is an extinct genus of trematosaurian temnospondyl found in the Mid-Late Triassic Q6 locality of Arcadia Formation in Queensland, Australia. It had been thought to be a basal chigutisaurid but is now thought to be a basal brachyopomorph closely related to the genus Bothriceps, and may even be a synonym of it.

== See also ==
- Prehistoric amphibian
- List of prehistoric amphibians
