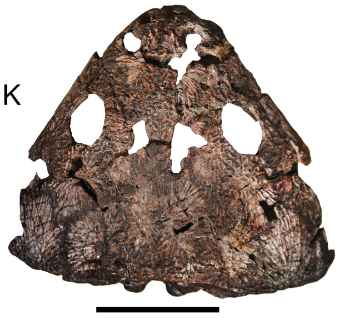
- Holotype skull of X. allos

Scientific classification
- Kingdom: Animalia
- Phylum: Chordata
- Clade: Tetrapoda
- Order: †Temnospondyli
- Suborder: †Stereospondyli
- Family: †Brachyopidae
- Genus: †Xenobrachyops; Warren and Hutchinson 1983
- Species: †X. allos

Binomial name
- †Xenobrachyops allos (Howie, 1972)

Synonyms
- Brachyops allos Howie, 1972

= Xenobrachyops =

Xenobrachyops Temporal range: Lowermost Late Triassic (Carnian) 236 Ma

Extinct genus of amphibians

Xenobrachyops is an extinct monotypic genus of brachyopid temnospondyl amphibian from the Arcadia Formation of Queensland, Australia. The type species is Xenobrachyops allos. Its fossils date to the lowermost Carnian age of the Late Triassic period.

== History of study ==
Material of Xenobrachyops was first collected from the Duckworth Creek locality in exposures of what was then considered the Rewan Formation (now the Arcadia Formation of the Rewan Group). The holotype skull of Xenobrachyops allos, the type species, was collected from a red mudstone. Howie (1972) originally placed the species in Brachyops, although some concerns were expressed with existing quantitative (non-phylogenetic) methods for differentiating taxa.

Warren (1981) described a pair of hemimandibles from Duckworth Creek that were referred to Brachyops allos on the basis of similar curvature, size, and dentition.

Later work by Warren & Hutchinson (1983) recovered 'Brachyops allos' as being distantly related to Brachyops laticeps within Brachyopoidea, leading them to propose the new genus Xenobrachyops from the Greek xenos ("strange") and Brachyops.

The holotype was subsequently restudied by Damiani & Warren (1996), who identified several additional diagnostic features of the taxon.

The review of Brachyopoidea by Warren & Marsicano (2000) also lists an undescribed fragmentary clavicle and an undescribed fragmentary interclavicle as referred specimens, although these specimens were not listed in Schoch & Milner's (2014) review.

== Anatomy ==
The diagnosis of X. allos has been relatively unchanged, with Schoch & Milner listing only two features, denticles on the parasphenoid at the base of the cultriform process and a posteriorly expanded ectopterygoid that extends along the margin of the subtemporal fossa. Previous workers have remarked on features that were unusual or unique at the time of study. Warren & Marsicano (2000) noted several plesiomorphic features, such as an angled medial margin of the subtemporal fossa (not parallel to the skull midline), the absence of a palatoquadrate fissure between the squamosal and the palate, and the posteriorly truncated quadrate ramus of the pterygoid. Damiani & Warren (1996) considered the posteriorly expanded ectopterygoid to be an autapomorphy, though they noted that this feature is present to a lesser extent in Batrachosuchus and Batrachosuchoides. They also considered a tripartite anterior palatal vacuity to be autapomorphic. An ossified septomaxilla and a lateral exposure of the palatine (LEP) are other features not always observed in brachyopids.

== Phylogenetic relationships ==
Phylogenetic analyses usually recover Xenobrachyops at or near the base of Brachyopidae.
