= Lesley Kool =

Australian palaeontologist

- Awards: Medal of the Order of Australia (2023)
- Scientific career
- Fields: Palaeontology
- Institutions: Museums Victoria

Lesley Kool is an Australian palaeontologist and research associate at Museums Victoria. She is best known for her work on polar dinosaur and mammal fossils from the Cretaceous period in Victoria, and for her role in the discovery and preparation of the species Koolasuchus cleelandi, the State Fossil Emblem of Victoria.

== Career ==
Kool began her involvement in palaeontology in 1983, when she volunteered to join a dinosaur excavation in the Otways led by Dr Thomas H. Rich, Curator of Vertebrate Palaeontology at Museums Victoria. The dig was part of an ongoing effort to investigate the Cretaceous deposits along Victoria's south coast, following up on the 1903 discovery of Australia's first dinosaur bone, the Cape Paterson Claw, by William Ferguson.

She became a key member of the field and research team that included palaeontologists such as Tim Flannery and Mike Cleeland, focusing on the study of fossilised remains from the Otway Ranges and Bunurong Coast.

Over four decades, Kool has contributed to discoveries that reshaped understanding of how dinosaurs and early mammals adapted to polar conditions, challenging global theories about thermoregulation and evolution during the Cretaceous period.

== Koolasuchus cleelandi ==
In 1990, her colleague Mike Cleeland discovered fossilised jawbones near San Remo on Boonwurrung Country. Kool worked for months to prepare the specimens, which were later identified as belonging to a new species of temnospondyl amphibian, Koolasuchus cleelandi. The genus name Koolasuchus honours both Lesley Kool and the “cool” polar environment where the fossil was found. In 2022, Koolasuchus cleelandi was designated the official fossil emblem of Victoria.

== Dinosaur Dreaming ==
Kool is the long-time coordinator of the “Dinosaur Dreaming” project, a collaborative fossil excavation and research program centred on the Bunurong Coast. The project engages volunteers, students, and scientists in uncovering and studying polar dinosaur fossils and has become an important science education initiative in Victoria.

In 2023, she described the planned “Bass Coast Dinosaurs Trail” as a major educational and tourism opportunity for the region, highlighting the area's rich palaeontological history.

== Honours ==
On 26 January 2023, Lesley Kool was awarded the Medal of the Order of Australia (OAM) for "service to palaeontology".

== Personal life ==
Kool lives in Wonthaggi North, Victoria, with her husband, Gerry.
