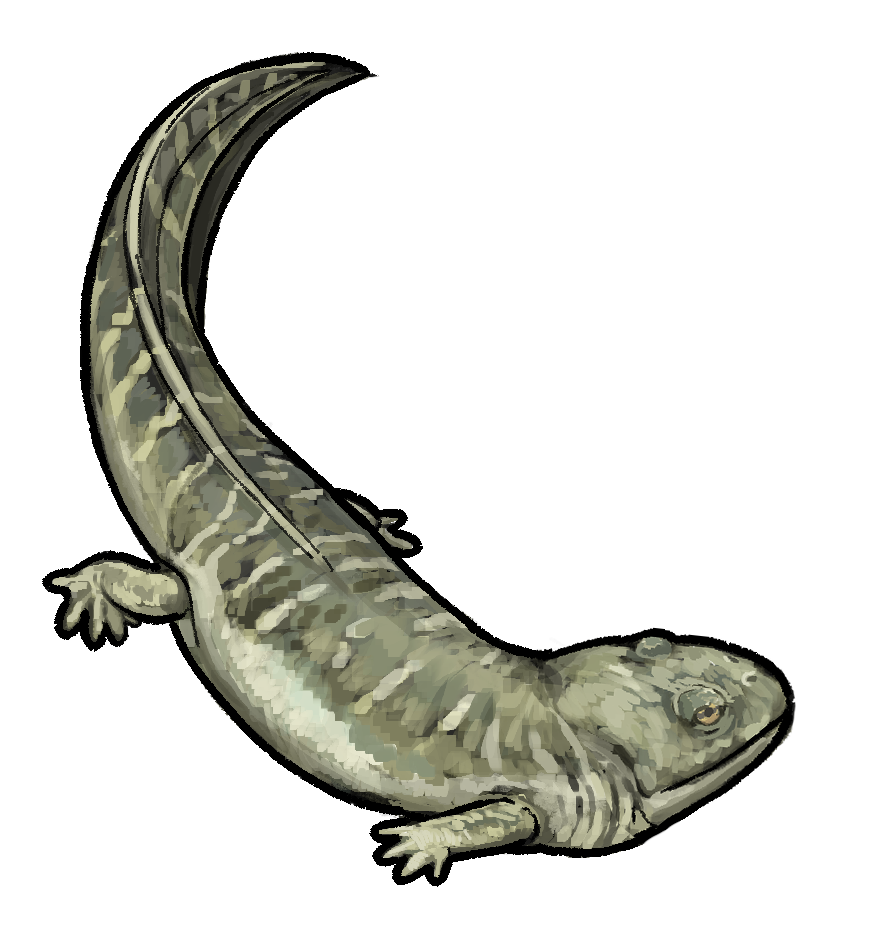
- Life Restoration

Scientific classification
- Kingdom: Animalia
- Phylum: Chordata
- Clade: Tetrapoda
- Order: †Temnospondyli
- Suborder: †Stereospondyli
- Family: †Brachyopidae
- Genus: †Notobrachyops; Cosgriff, 1967

Type species
- Notobrachyops picketti Cosgriff, 1967

= Notobrachyops =

Notobrachyops Temporal range: Late Triassic

Extinct genus of amphibians

Notobrachyops is a genus of brachyopid temnospondyl amphibian. It is known from a skull roof impression found in the Ashfield Shale (Late Triassic) of Mortdale, New South Wales, Australia. The Ashfield Shale has also yielded a shark species, a lungfish species, six species of paleoniscid fish, a species of holostean fish, a subholostean fish, and the labyrinthodont amphibian Paracyclotosaurus davidi.

== See also ==
- List of prehistoric amphibians
- Prehistoric amphibian
