= Splenial =

Bone in the lower jaw of reptiles, amphibians and birds

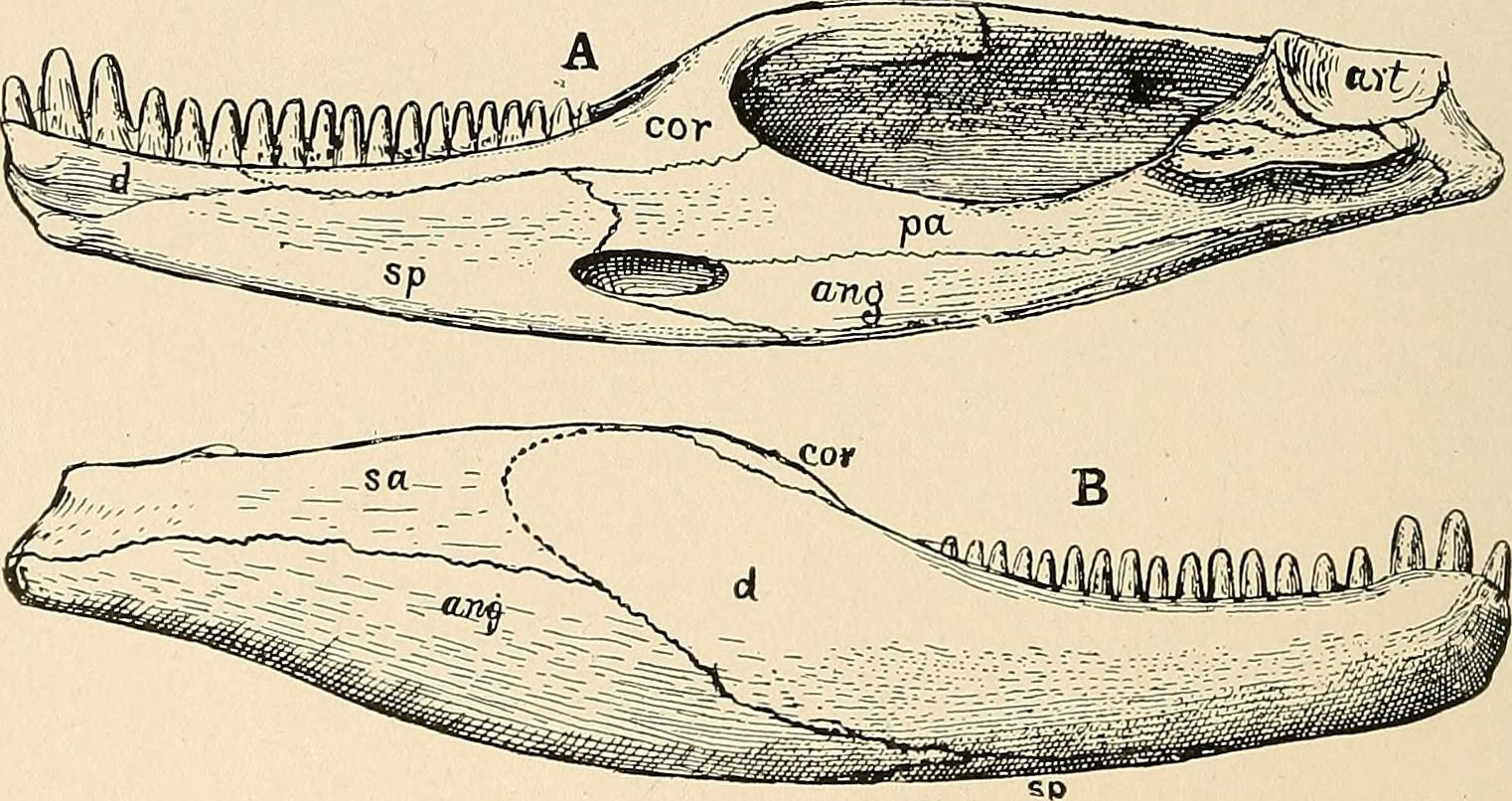
Hemimandible of Trimerorhachis; the splenial (labeled "sp") is visible on the interior surface

Skull and jaws diagram of the primitive synapsid Dimetrodon, showing location of the splenial

The splenial is a small bone in the lower jaw of reptiles, amphibians and birds, usually located on the lingual side (closest to the tongue) between the angular and surangular. The splenial and coronoid are together known as the paradental elements. In non-tetrapod vertebrates, the splenial is known as the first infradentary and forms part of the infradentary series along with the postsplenial and angular. The earliest known taxon with infradentary bones is the placoderm Entelognathus, while they were absent in the earlier-diverging Qilinyu. Splenials are present in non-mammalian synapsids, but lost in mammals, though there are some claims of a vestigial splenial in some early mammals.
