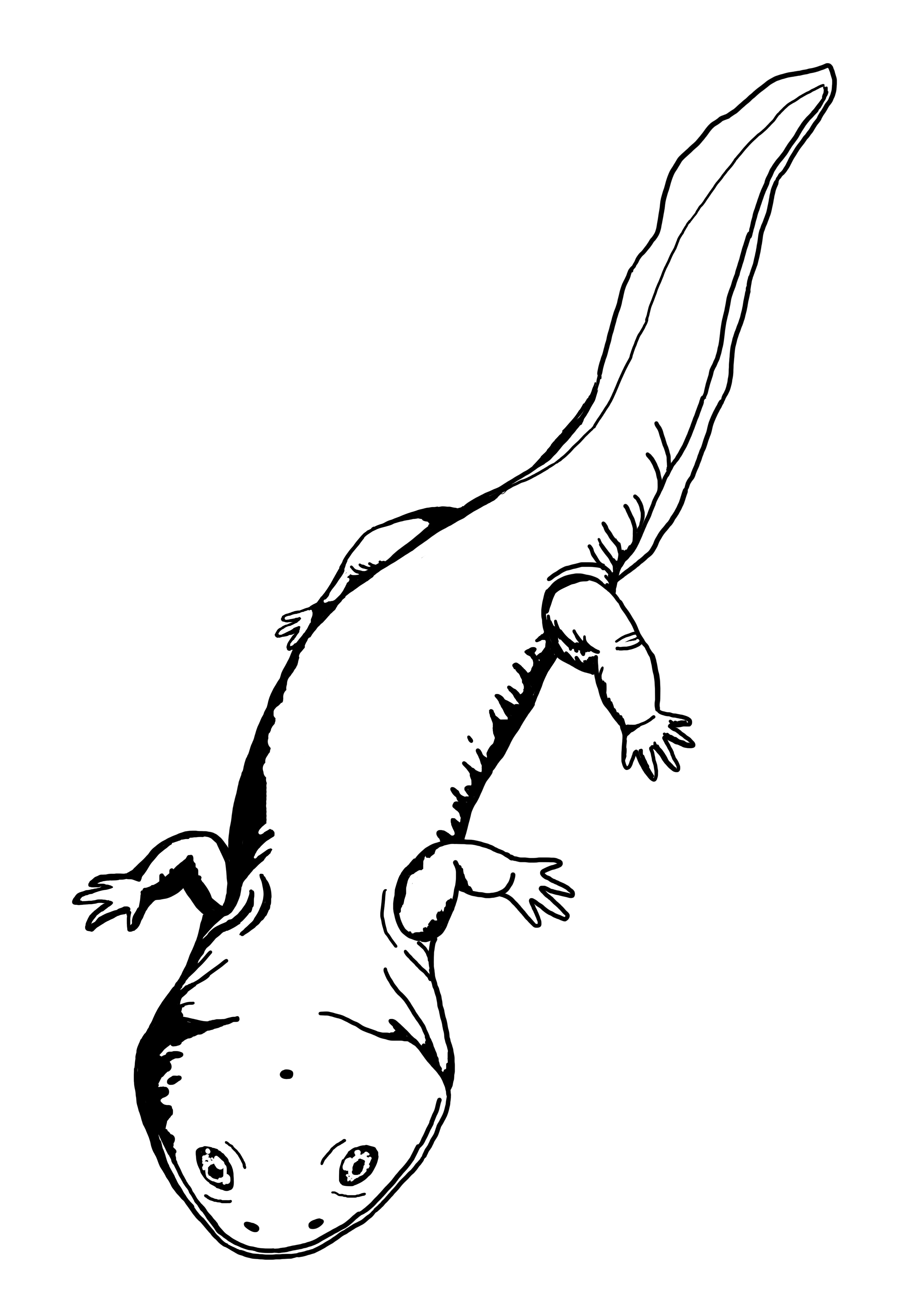
- Restoration of Vigilius wellesi

Scientific classification
- Kingdom: Animalia
- Phylum: Chordata
- Clade: Tetrapoda
- Order: †Temnospondyli
- Suborder: †Stereospondyli
- Family: †Brachyopidae
- Genus: †Vigilius; Warren and Marsicano, 2000

Type species
- †Vigilius wellesi Warren and Marsicano, 2000

= Vigilius (amphibian) =

Vigilius Temporal range: Middle Triassic, 247.2–242.0 Ma

Extinct genus of amphibians

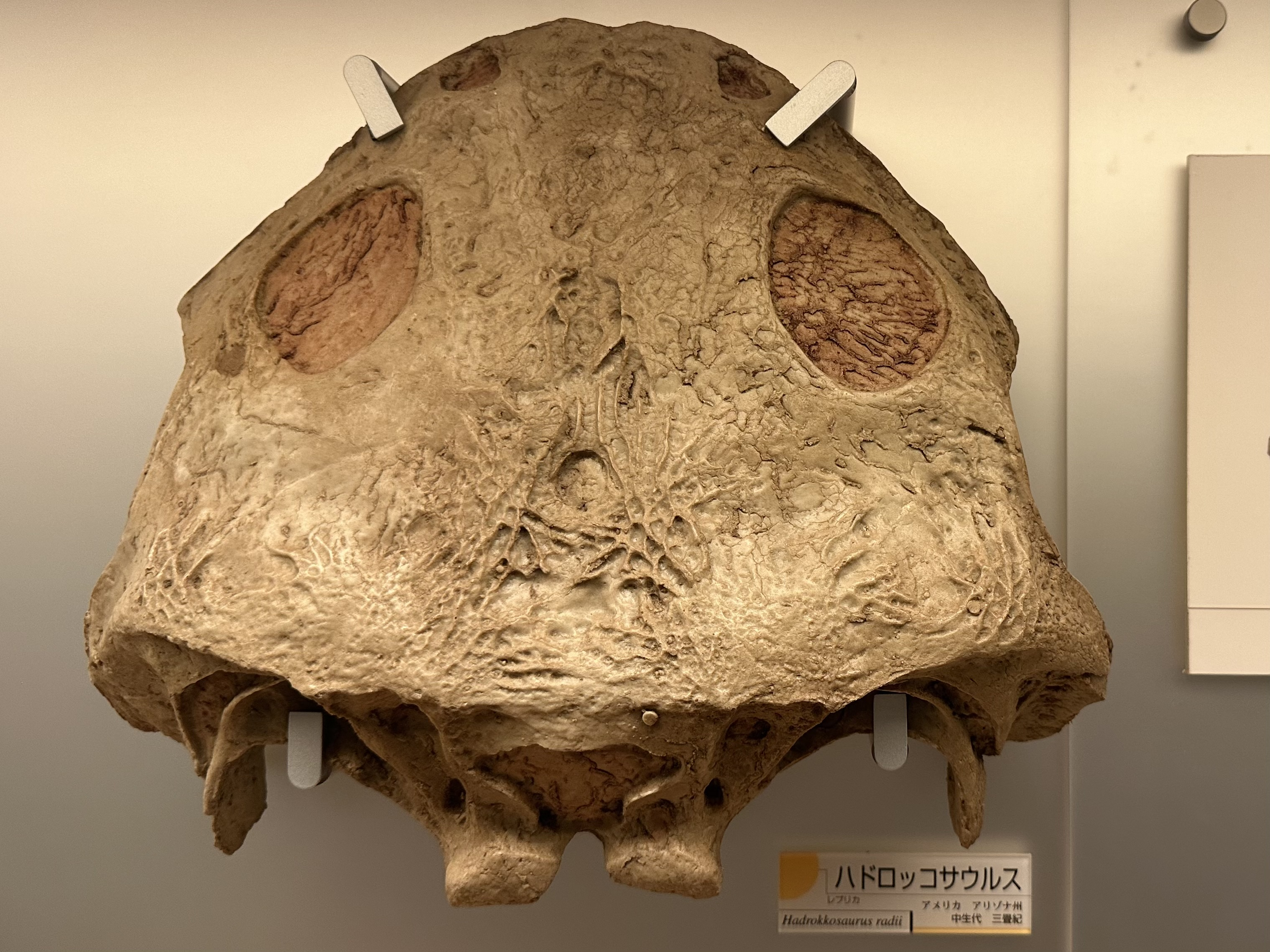
Skull

Vigilius is an extinct genus of brachyopid temnospondyl amphibian from the Triassic of Arizona. It is known from the single type species Vigilius wellesi.

The holotype specimen of Vigilius is a skull labelled UCMP 36199. The skull was found in an area alongside Arizona State Route 64 overlooking the Grand Canyon. It came from a layer of the Early Triassic Moenkopi Formation. The skull was described by paleontologists Samuel Paul Welles and Richard Estes in 1969 and attributed to a new genus and species of brachyopid called Hadrokkosaurus bradyi. The holotype of Hadrokkosaurus was an isolated lower jaw. In 2000, paleontologists Anne Warren and Claudia Marsicano suggested that the lower jaw and skull represent two different species, as they were found over 160 kilometres (99 mi) apart and come from two animals of different size. Warren and Marsicano assigned the skull the a new genus and species Vigilius wellesi. The genus name comes from the Latin word vigilia meaning "keeping watch," a reference to its large eye sockets and "to the fact that the skull was keeping vigil over the Grand Canyon." The species was named in honor of Welles. Several bones found around the Grand Canyon site were also attributed to Vigilius, including a pterygoid bone that was described in 1971 as a scapulacoracoid. Additional remains were found 10 kilometres (6.2 mi) west of Holbrook, Arizona.

== Phylogeny ==
The material now assigned to Vigilius was first identified as remains of a brachyopoid. Warren and Marsicano conducted a phylogenetic analysis of many brachyopoids and found Vigilius to nest within the family Brachyopidae. Brachyopoidea is normally divided into the families Brachyopidae and Chigutisauridae, but these families are not always considered closely related; in some studies, Chigutisauridae is placed in a group of mostly Mesozoic temnospondyls called Stereospondyli while Brachyopidae is classified within a group of temnospondyls called Dvinosauria, which includes Carboniferous and Permian taxa that are older than Vigilius. The relationship of dvinosaurians to other temnospondyls is uncertain, as they may or may not belong to Stereospondyli. Warren and Marsicano identified many features in Vigilius that are not seen in other brachyopoids but are common in dvinosaurians, including a narrow vomer bone at the front of the palate and a very wide cultriform process at the front of the parasphenoid, a bone on the underside of the skull. They considered Vigilius to be a dvinosaur in spite of the results of their phylogenetic analysis.
