= Batrachosuchoides =

Batrachosuchoides Temporal range: Early Triassic

Scientific classification
- Kingdom: Animalia
- Phylum: Chordata
- Clade: Tetrapoda
- Order: †Temnospondyli
- Suborder: †Stereospondyli
- Family: †Brachyopidae
- Genus: †Batrachosuchoides; Shishkin, 1967

Type species
- Batrachosuchoides lacer Shishkin, 1967

Other species
- †B. impressus Novikov & Shiskin, 1994

Extinct genus of amphibians

Batrachosuchoides is an extinct genus of prehistoric amphibian from the Early Triassic of Russia. It was found in the Baskunchakskaia Series and the Lestanshorskaya Svita.

== See also ==
- Prehistoric amphibian
- List of prehistoric amphibians
