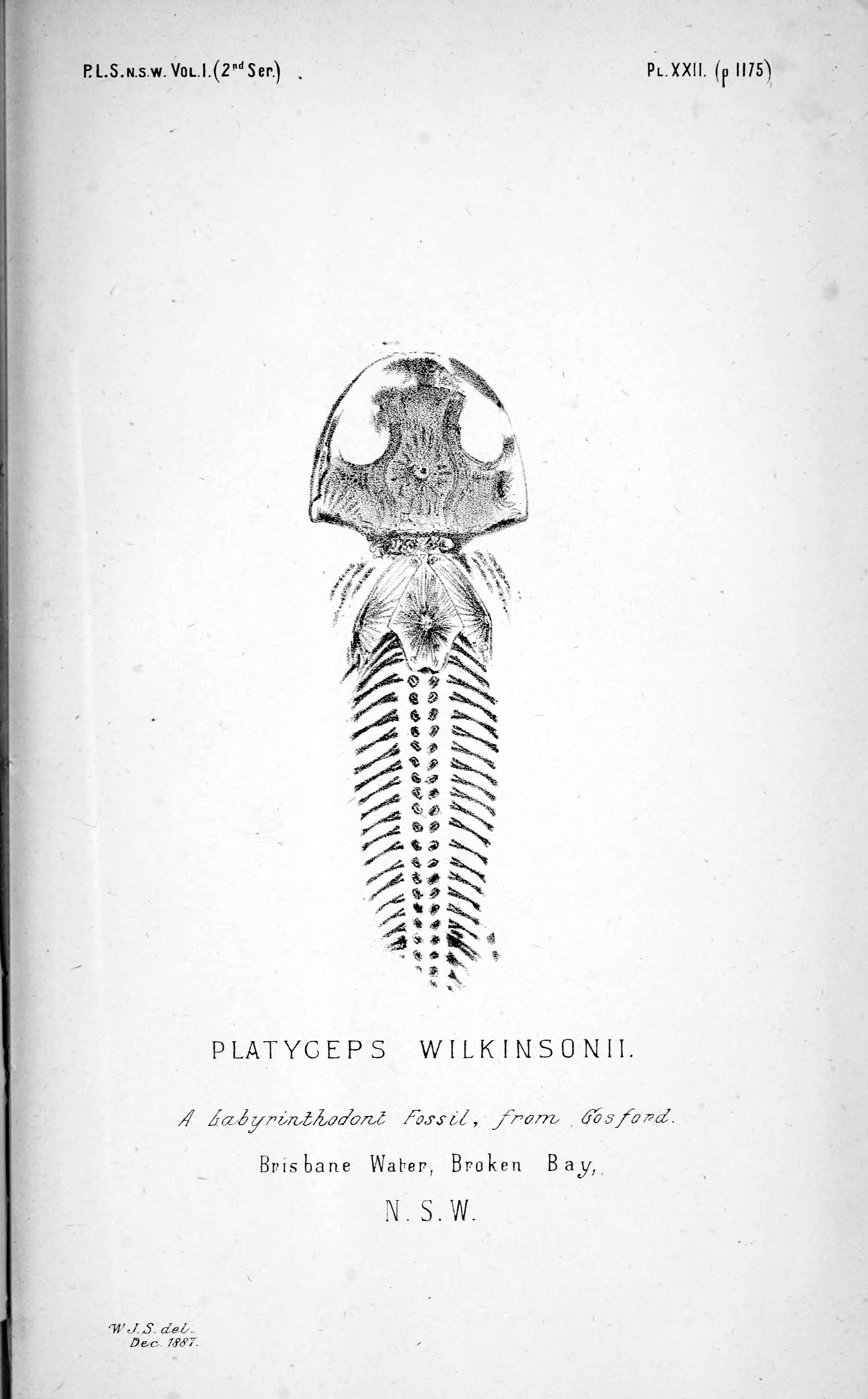
- Partial skeleton, drawn in 1887

Scientific classification
- Kingdom: Animalia
- Phylum: Chordata
- Clade: Tetrapoda
- Order: †Temnospondyli
- Suborder: †Stereospondyli
- Family: †Brachyopidae
- Genus: †Platycepsion; Kuhn 1964
- Species: †P. wilksoni

Binomial name
- †Platycepsion wilksoni (Stephens, 1887)

= Platycepsion =

Extinct genus of amphibians

Platycepsion wilksoni is an extinct species of prehistoric amphibian, known from partial skeleton deposited in shale at the Gosford Quarry site of the Terrigal Formation in Australia. This specimen may represent a larval stage, as denoted by the presence of external gills, making it the first evidence of larval development in stereospondyls.

== Taxonomy ==
The species is assigned to a currently monotypic genus, the synonym Platyceps wilkinsonii, a name published in 1887 by the Australian palaeontologist William Stephens, was nominated as the type. A revision in 1964 by Oskar Kuhn assigned the species to the genus Platycepsion to replace the earlier combination, which was invalidated by an earlier use of the name Platyceps for a colubrid genus of snakes. Another revising author John W. Cosgriff named the species as the type for a new genus, Blinasaurus, unaware of Kuhn's replacement of the name, and placed a second species in the same genus, later separated to a new combination as Batrachosuchus henwoodi.

The author noted the epithet Wilkinsonii in the first description as commemorating the deputy chair of the Linnean Society of New South Wales, C. S. Wilkinson.
