= Postsplenial =

The postsplenial is a bone in the lower jaw of sarcopterygians. It lies between the splenial and angular bones as the second bone in the infradentary series, and is accordingly also known as the second infradentary. As with the splenial, it is a part of the dermatocranium.

The postsplenial is present in various basal tetrapods, but is lost in amniotes and nectrideans. In the generalized osteolepiform pattern of the lateral line system, the mandibular sensory canal runs along the infradentaries, including the postsplenial, and there is an additional vertical C-shaped pit line on the postsplenial.
