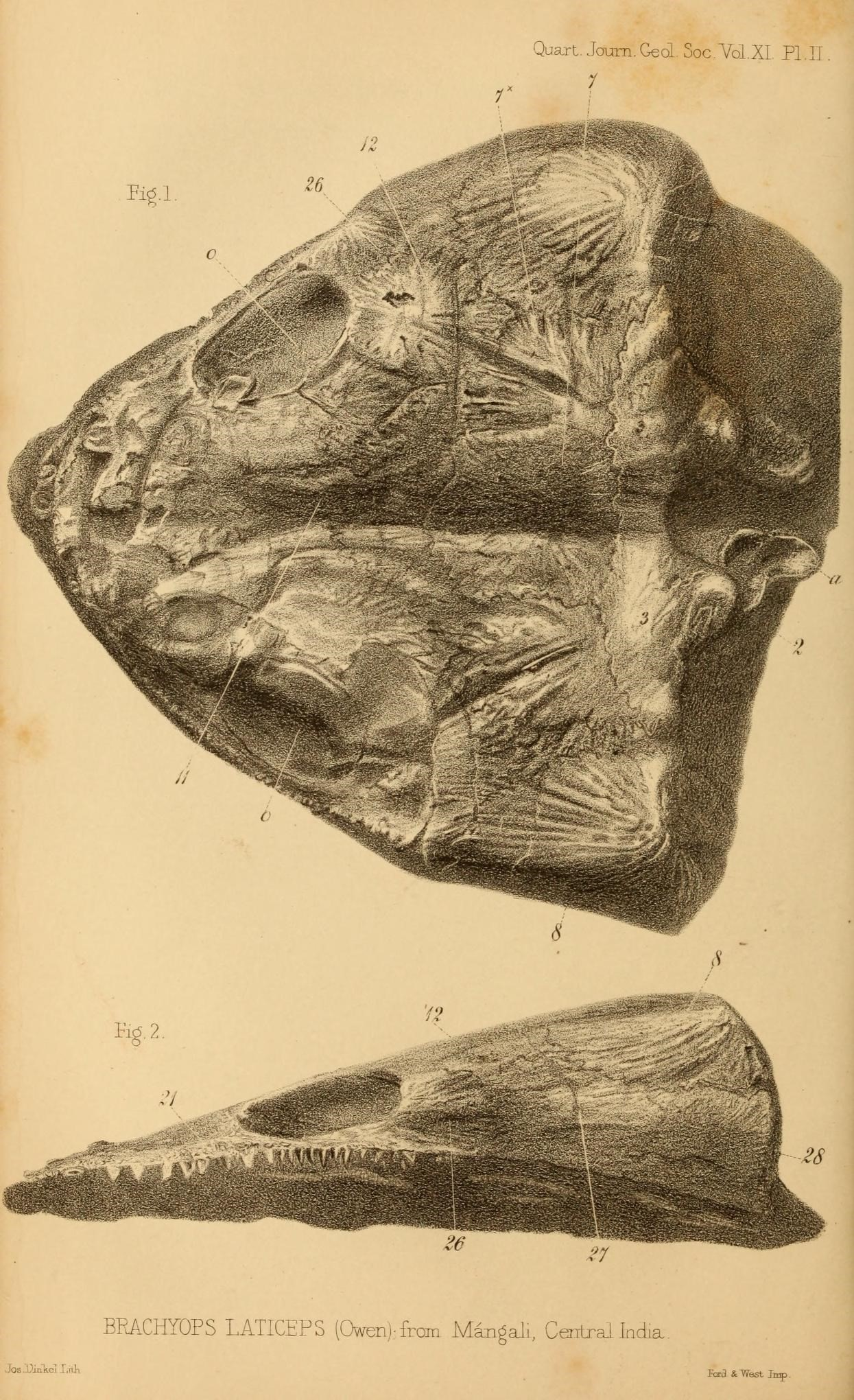
- Holotype skull of Brachyops laticeps

Scientific classification
- Kingdom: Animalia
- Phylum: Chordata
- Clade: Tetrapoda
- Order: †Temnospondyli
- Suborder: †Stereospondyli
- Family: †Brachyopidae
- Genus: †Brachyops; Owen, 1855
- Species: †B. laticeps

Binomial name
- †Brachyops laticeps Owen, 1855

= Brachyops =

Brachyops Temporal range: Early Triassic, Induan to Olenekian

Extinct genus of amphibians

Brachyops is an extinct genus of brachyopid temnospondyl amphibian that lived during Early Triassic(Induan to Olenekian) in what is now Wardha Valley in Maharashtra, India, likely from the Kamthi Formation. The type species is Brachyops laticeps. It was the first described brachyopid ever, and also one of the oldest brachyopid currently known.
