= Angular bone =

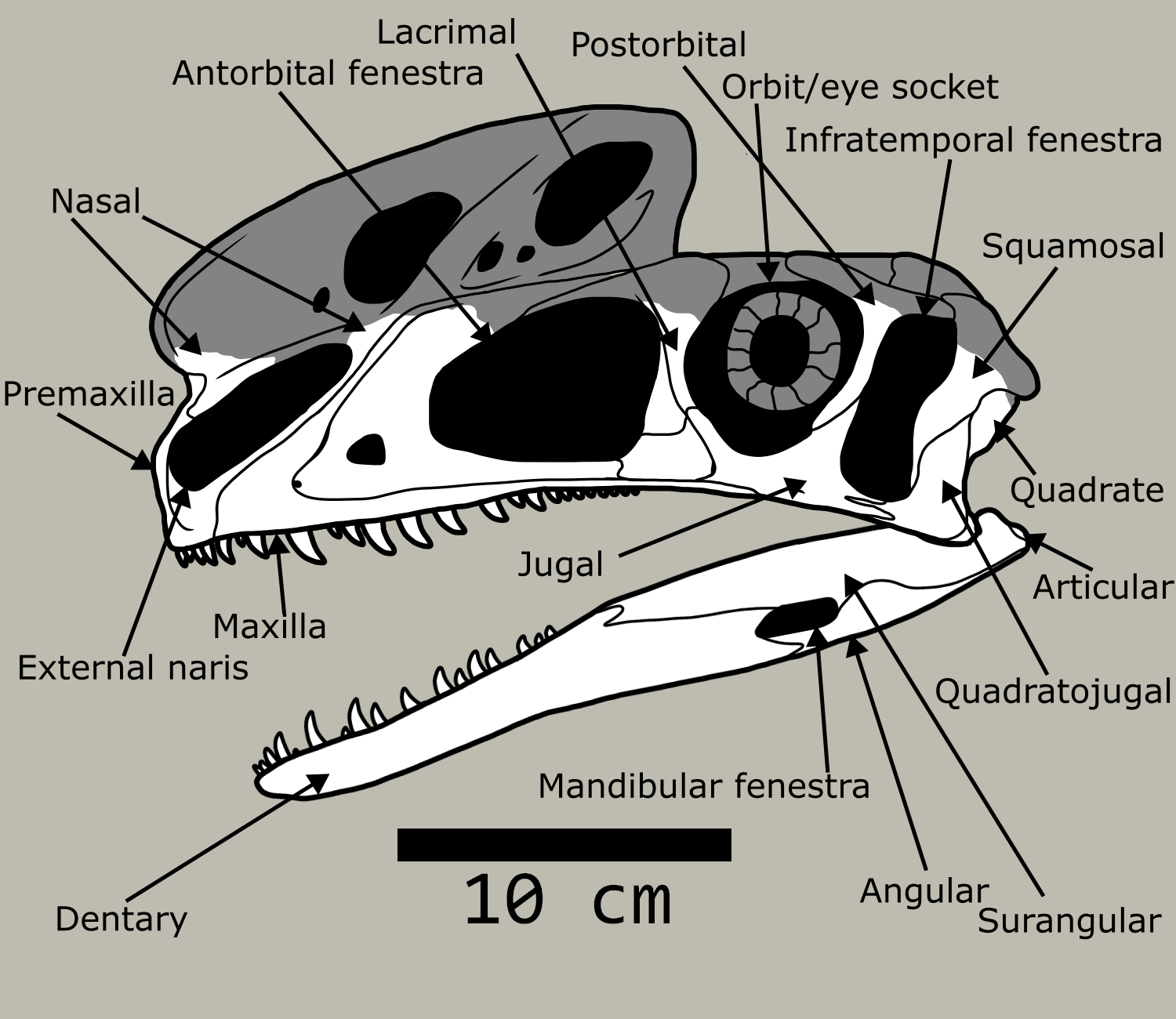
Skull diagram of the dinosaur Proceratosaurus, showing location of angular

Skull and jaws diagram of the primitive synapsid Dimetrodon, showing location of the angular

The angular is a large bone in the lower jaw (mandible) of amphibians and reptiles (birds included), which is connected to several other lower jaw bones: the dentary (which is the entire lower jaw in mammals), the splenial, the surangular, and the articular. It is homologous to the tympanic bone in mammals, due to the incorporation of several jaw bones into the mammalian middle ear early in mammal evolution. It is also known as the third infradentary in sarcopterygian fish.

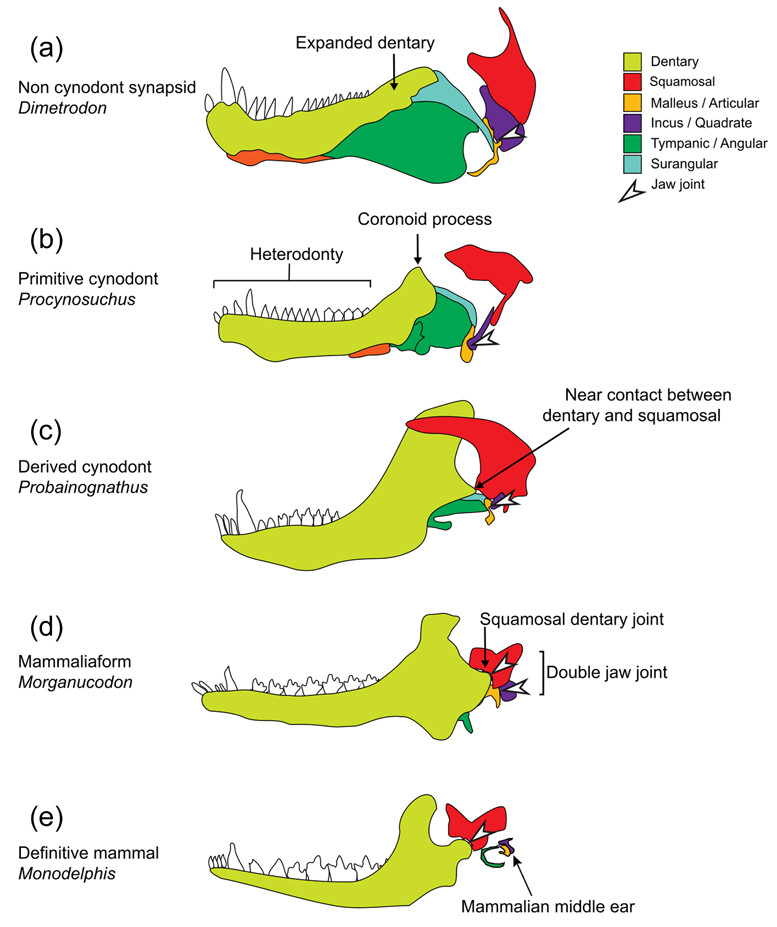
Diagram showing synapsid jaw evolution from early "pelycosaur" synapsids to modern mammals, showing the transformation of the angular to the tympanic

In therapsids (mammal ancestors and their kin), the lower jaw is made up of the dentary (the mandible in mammals) and a group of smaller "postdentary" bones near the jaw joint. As the dentary increased in size over millions of years, two of these postdentary bones, the articular and angular, became increasingly reduced and the dentary eventually made direct contact with the upper jaw. These postdentary bones, even before their articular function was lost, probably transmitted sound vibrations to the stapes and, in some therapsids, a bent plate that might have supported a membrane capable of detecting vibrations developed on the angular. Eventually, it developed into the ectotympanic ring which supports the tympanic membrane in the ears of modern mammals.
