= Batrachosaurus =

Batrachosaurus Temporal range: Middle Triassic, Ladinian

Scientific classification
- Domain: Eukaryota
- Kingdom: Animalia
- Phylum: Chordata
- Order: †Temnospondyli
- Suborder: †Stereospondyli
- Family: †Brachyopidae
- Genus: †Batrachosaurus; Fitzinger, 1837

Type species
- †Batrachosaurus jaegeri Fitzinger, 1840

Extinct genus of amphibians

Batrachosaurus is an extinct genus of prehistoric brachyopoid amphibian that lived in Germany during the Middle Triassic (Ladinian). The genus was named by Joseph Fitzinger in 1837 and the type species, B. jaegeri, was named three years later in 1840. It may have been the same animal as Mastodonsaurus.

== See also ==
- Prehistoric amphibian
- List of prehistoric amphibians
