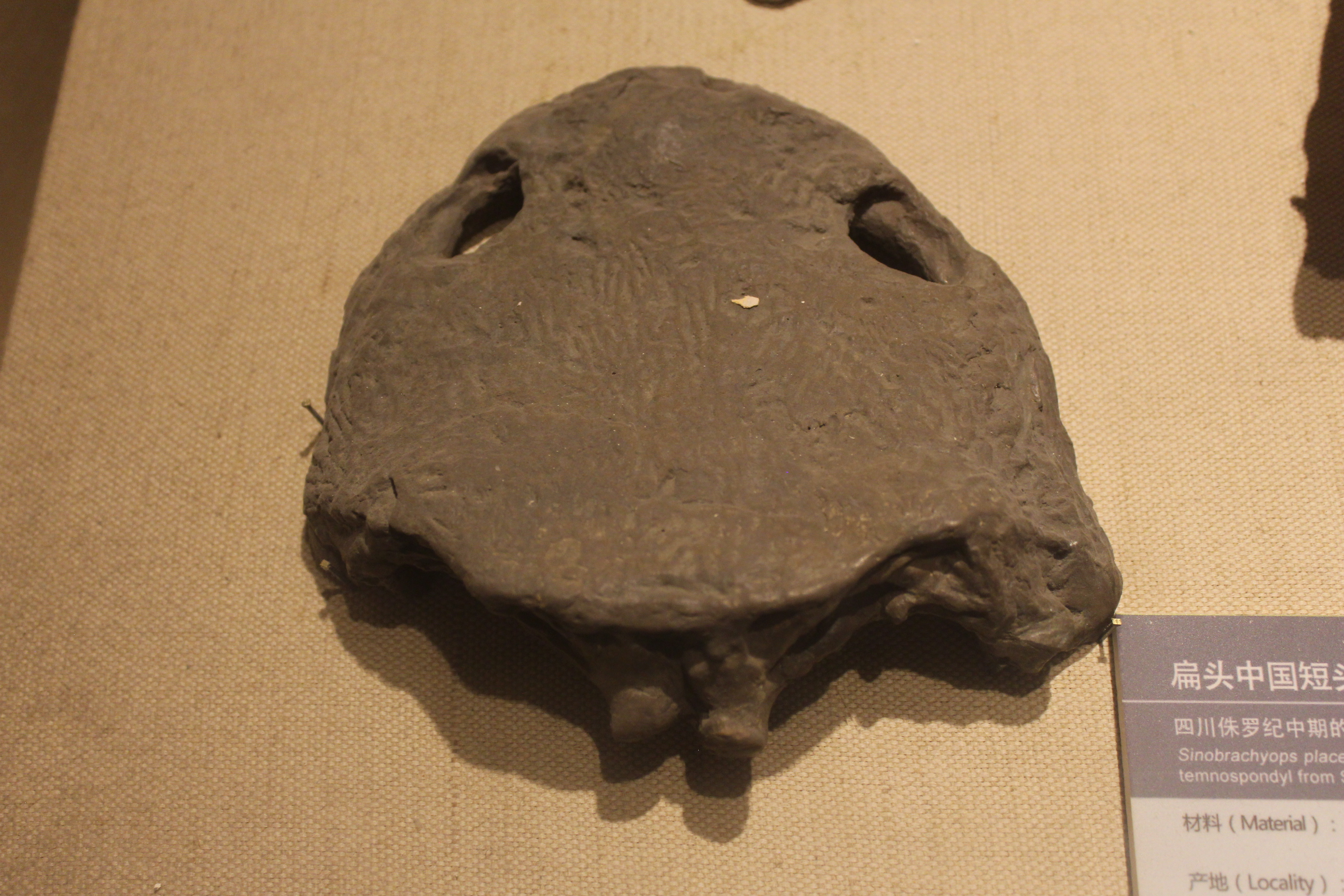
- Type skull, Paleozoological Museum of China

Scientific classification
- Domain: Eukaryota
- Kingdom: Animalia
- Phylum: Chordata
- Order: †Temnospondyli
- Suborder: †Stereospondyli
- Family: †Brachyopidae
- Genus: †Sinobrachyops; Dong, 1985
- Species: †S. placenticephalus

Binomial name
- †Sinobrachyops placenticephalus Dong, 1985

= Sinobrachyops =

Sinobrachyops Temporal range: Middle Jurassic

Extinct genus of amphibians

Sinobrachyops placenticephalus is an extinct temnospondyl amphibian from Middle Jurassic-aged Shaximiao Formation in the Sichuan basin, China.

== See also ==
- Prehistoric amphibian
- List of prehistoric amphibians
