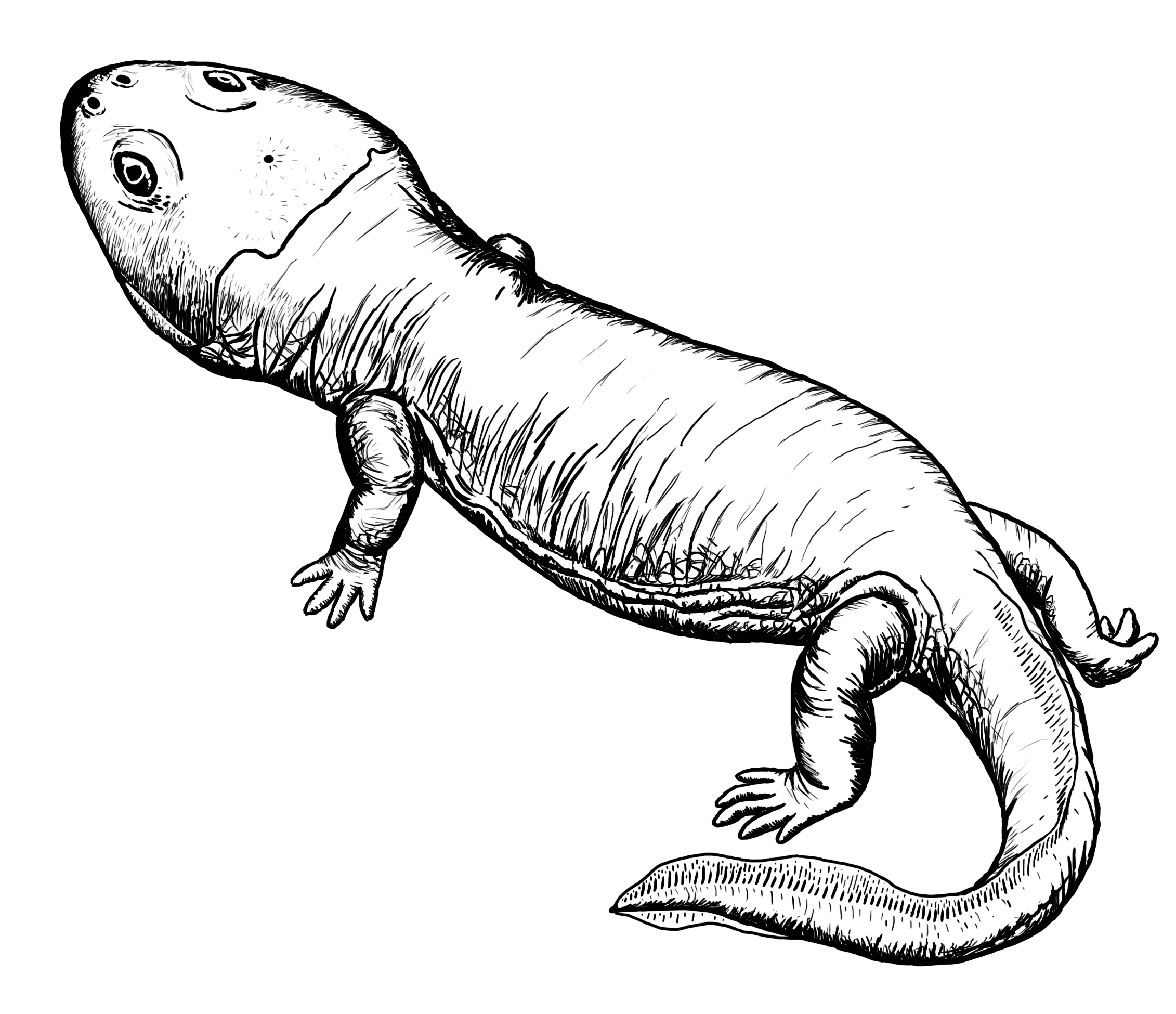
- Restoration of Banksiops townrowi

Scientific classification
- Kingdom: Animalia
- Phylum: Chordata
- Clade: Tetrapoda
- Order: †Temnospondyli
- Suborder: †Stereospondyli
- Family: †Brachyopidae
- Genus: †Banksiops; Warren & Marsicano, 2000

Species
- Banksiops townrowi

Synonyms
- Blinasaurus townrowi

= Banksiops =

Extinct genus of amphibians

Banksiops is an extinct genus of temnospondyl amphibian in the family Brachyopidae, recovered from the Old Beach locality in the Knocklofty Formation, Tasmania.

The type species, Blinasaurus townrowi, Cosgriff, 1974, was published as Banksia townrowi Warren & Marsicano, 1998 in a revision that erected this genus, a name emended to Banksiops townrowi Warren & Marsicano, 2000 in a subsequent note. The authors Anne Warren and Claudia Marscicano were alerted to another animal, a species of mite, that had used the name to commemorate the acarologist Nathan Banks. The genus name Banksia, still current for the flowering plants Banksia (named for Joseph Banks), was proposed by the palaeontologists Warren and Marsicano for the geologist Max Banks.

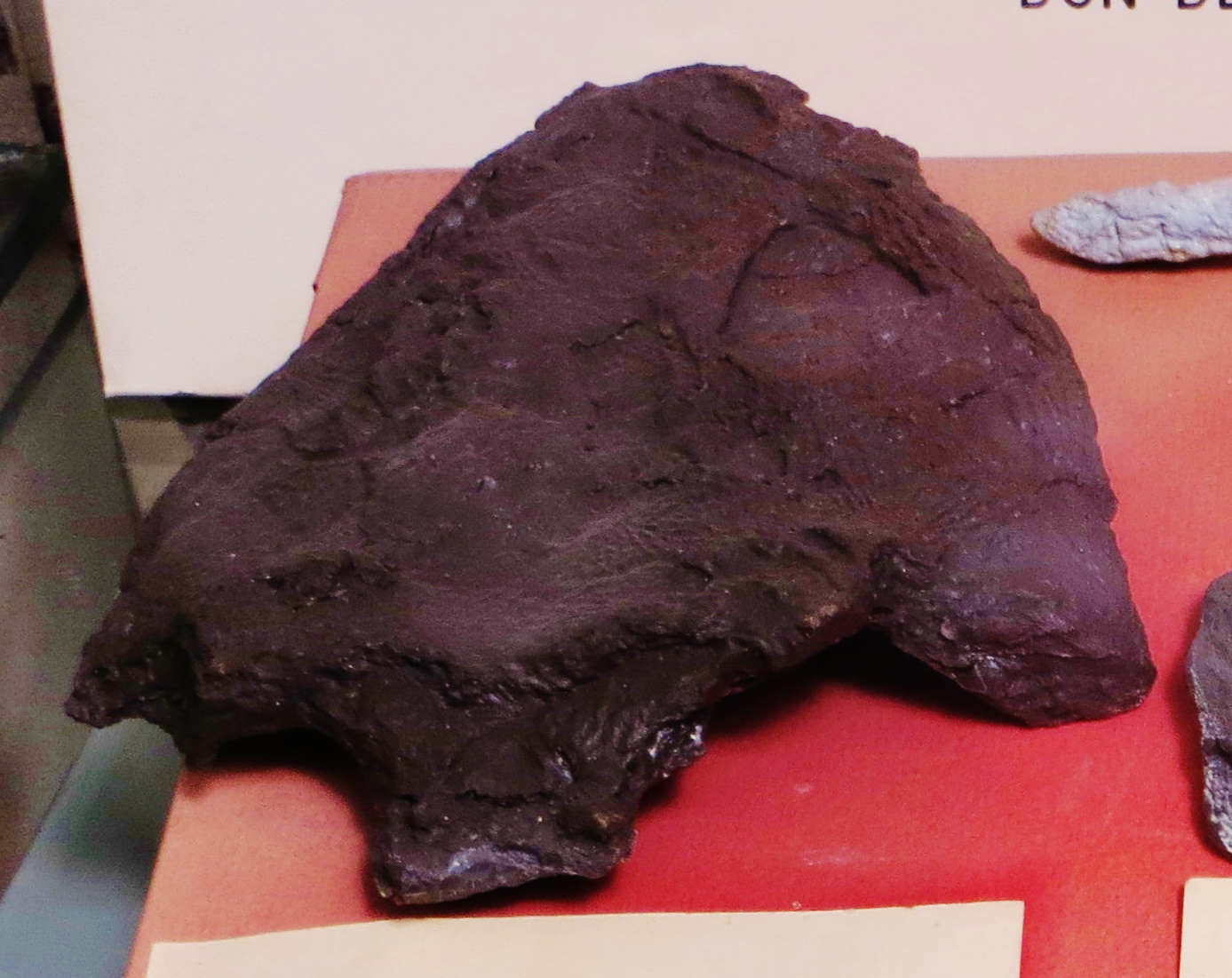
Skull

== See also ==
- List of prehistoric amphibians
