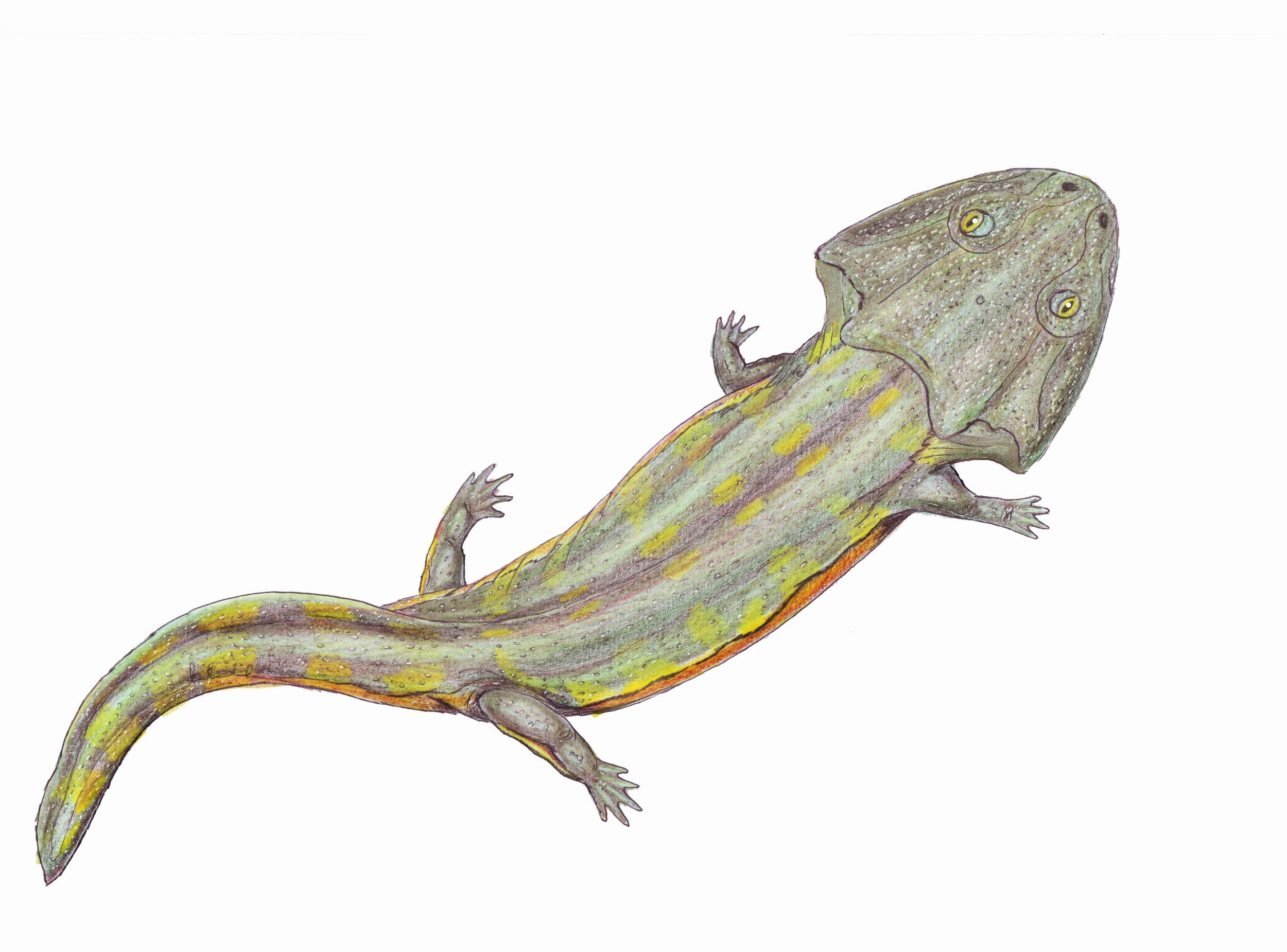
- Pelorocephalus

Scientific classification
- Kingdom: Animalia
- Phylum: Chordata
- Clade: Tetrapoda
- Order: †Temnospondyli
- Suborder: †Stereospondyli
- Superfamily: †Brachyopoidea
- Family: †Chigutisauridae; Rusconi, 1951

= Chigutisauridae =

Chigutisauridae Temporal range: Early Triassic–Early Cretaceous

Extinct family of temnospondyls

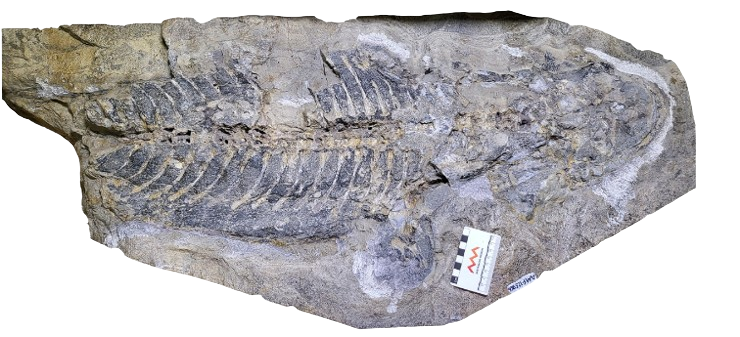
Arenaerpeton supinatus (specimen AM F125866) from the Sydney Basin

Chigutisauridae is an extinct family of large temnospondyls. The only genera recognized as belonging to Chigutisauridae at the current time are all from Gondwana. Chigutisaurids first appeared during the Early Triassic in Australia. During the Late Triassic they became widely distributed in Gondwana, with fossils found in South Africa, India and South America. Koolasuchus from the Early Cretaceous of Australia represents the youngest known temnospondyl genera.

== List of genera ==
- Arenaerpeton
- Compsocerops
- Keratobrachyops (placement uncertain)
- Koolasuchus
- Kuttycephalus
- Pelorocephalus
- Siderops
