= Vanastega =

Vanastega Temporal range: Middle Triassic, 247.2–242.0 Ma

Scientific classification
- Domain: Eukaryota
- Kingdom: Animalia
- Phylum: Chordata
- Order: †Temnospondyli
- Suborder: †Stereospondyli
- Family: †Brachyopidae
- Genus: †Vanastega; Damiani and Kitching, 2003

Type species
- †Vanastega plurimidens Damiani and Kitching, 2003

Extinct genus of amphibians

Vanastega is an extinct genus of Triassic temnospondyl amphibian in the family Brachyopidae. It is known from the Cynognathus Assemblage Zone in Burgersdorp, South Africa. The genus contains just one species, Vanastega plurimidens, the type species.

== See also ==
- List of prehistoric amphibians
