= Kuttycephalus =

Kuttycephalus Temporal range: Triassic, 221.5–205.6 Ma

Scientific classification
- Kingdom: Animalia
- Phylum: Chordata
- Clade: Tetrapoda
- Order: †Temnospondyli
- Suborder: †Stereospondyli
- Family: †Chigutisauridae
- Genus: †Kuttycephalus; Sengupta, 1995

Type species
- † Kuttycephalus triangularis Sengupta, 1995

Extinct genus of amphibians

Kuttycephalus is an extinct genus of temnospondyl amphibians in the family Chigutisauridae from the Upper Maleri Formation of India.

== See also ==
- List of prehistoric amphibians
