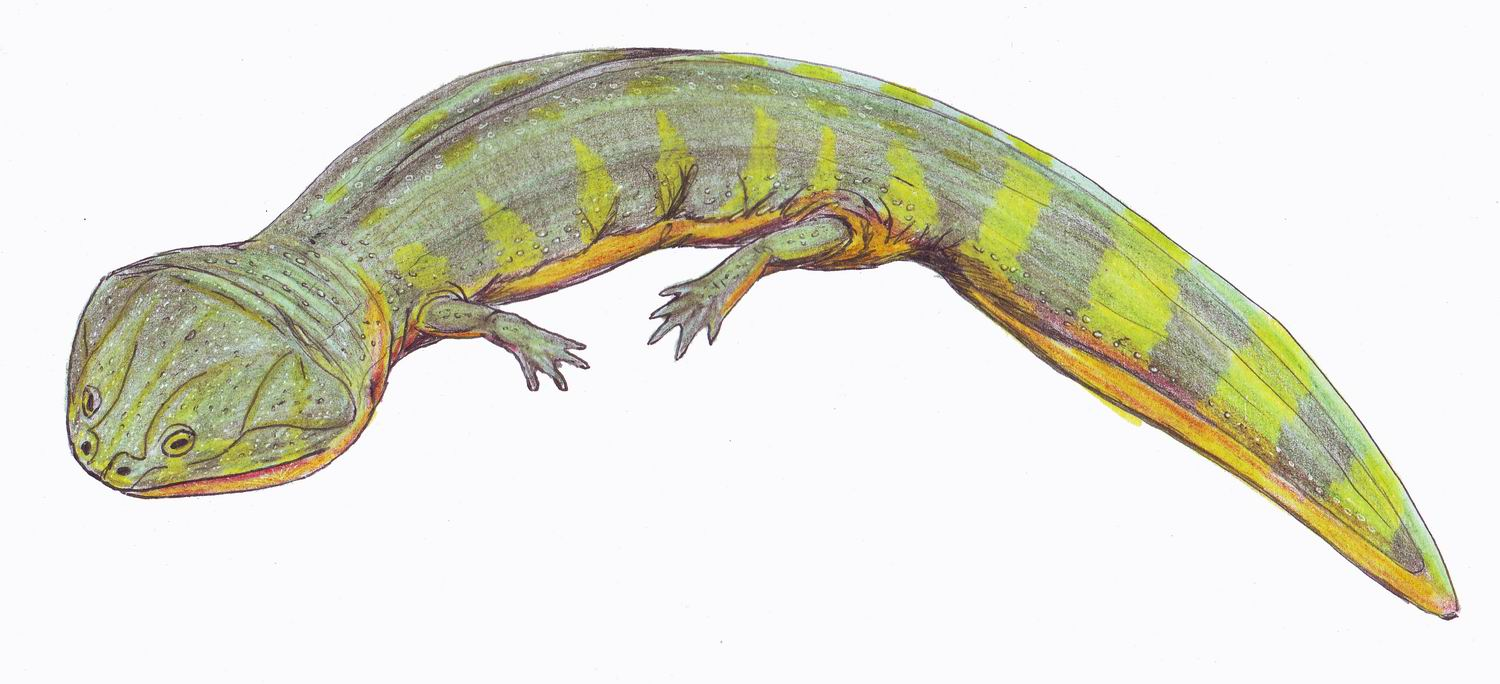
- Batrachosuchus

Scientific classification
- Domain: Eukaryota
- Kingdom: Animalia
- Phylum: Chordata
- Order: †Temnospondyli
- Suborder: †Stereospondyli
- Superfamily: †Brachyopoidea
- Family: †Brachyopidae; Lydekker, 1885

= Brachyopidae =

Brachyopidae Temporal range: 252.3–145 Ma

Extinct family of temnospondyls

Brachyopidae is an extinct family of temnospondyls. They evolved in the early Mesozoic and were mostly aquatic. A fragmentary find from Lesotho, Africa is estimated to have been 7 metres (23 ft) long, the largest amphibian ever known to have lived besides Prionosuchus and Mastodonsaurus. Brachyopids were the only group of temnospondyls to survive into the Jurassic aside from their sister family Chigutisauridae; there are records of brachyopids from the Jurassic of Asia.

== List of genera ==
- Banksiops
- Bathignathus
- Batrachosaurus
- Batrachosuchoides
- Batrachosuchus
- Brachyops
- Gobiops
- Notobrachyops
- ?Pachygonia
- Platycepsion
- Sinobrachyops
- Vanastega
- Vigilius
- Xenobrachyops
