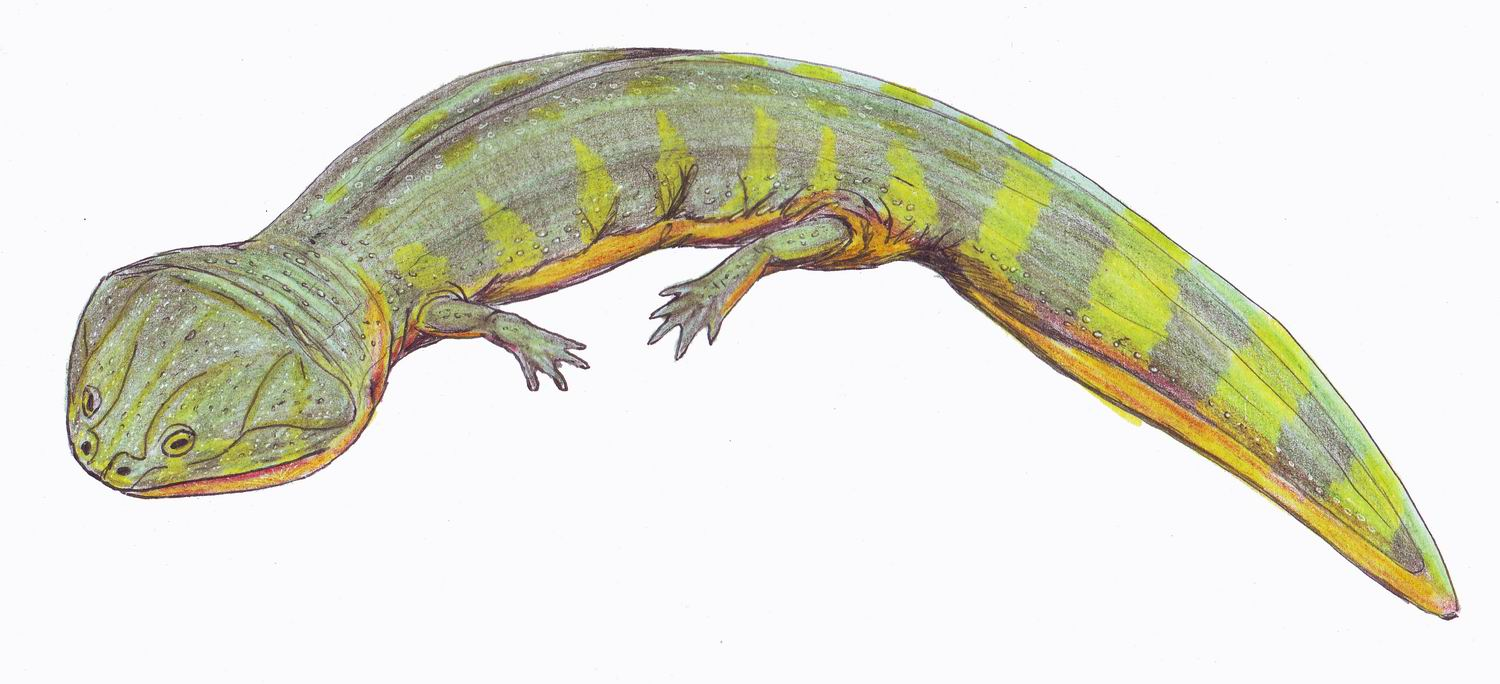

Scientific classification
- Kingdom: Animalia
- Phylum: Chordata
- Clade: Tetrapoda
- Order: †Temnospondyli
- Suborder: †Stereospondyli
- Family: †Brachyopidae
- Genus: †Batrachosuchus; Broom 1903

Type species
- Batrachosuchus browni Broom 1903

= Batrachosuchus =

Batrachosuchus Temporal range: Early-Mid Triassic ~252.3–242.0 Ma

Extinct genus of amphibians

Batrachosuchus is a genus of temnospondyl that existed from the Early to Middle Triassic of southern Africa (Ntawere Formation of Zambia and Burgersdorp Formation of South Africa) and the Blina Shale of Australia. The holotype is a skull registered at the Natural History Museum UK (NHMUK PV R 3589).

== Species ==
Three species have been described:

- Batrachosuchus browni Broom 1903
- Batrachosuchus concordi Chernin 1977
- Batrachosuchus henwoodi Cosgriff 1969
