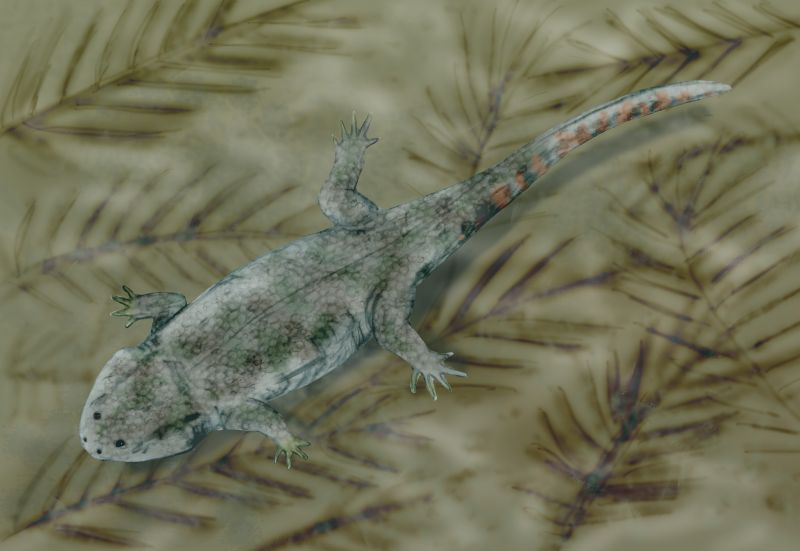

Scientific classification
- Kingdom: Animalia
- Phylum: Chordata
- Clade: Tetrapoda
- Order: †Temnospondyli
- Suborder: †Stereospondyli
- Family: †Chigutisauridae
- Genus: †Compsocerops; Sengupta, 1995

Species
- †Compsocerops cosgriffi Sengupta, 1995; †Compsocerops tikiensis Chakravorti & Sengupta, 2023

= Compsocerops =

Compsocerops Temporal range: Carnian–Norian ~235–206 Ma

Extinct genus of amphibians

Compsocerops is an extinct genus of temnospondyl amphibians recovered from the Late Triassic Upper Maleri and Tiki Formations of India, and the Santa Maria Formation of Brazil.

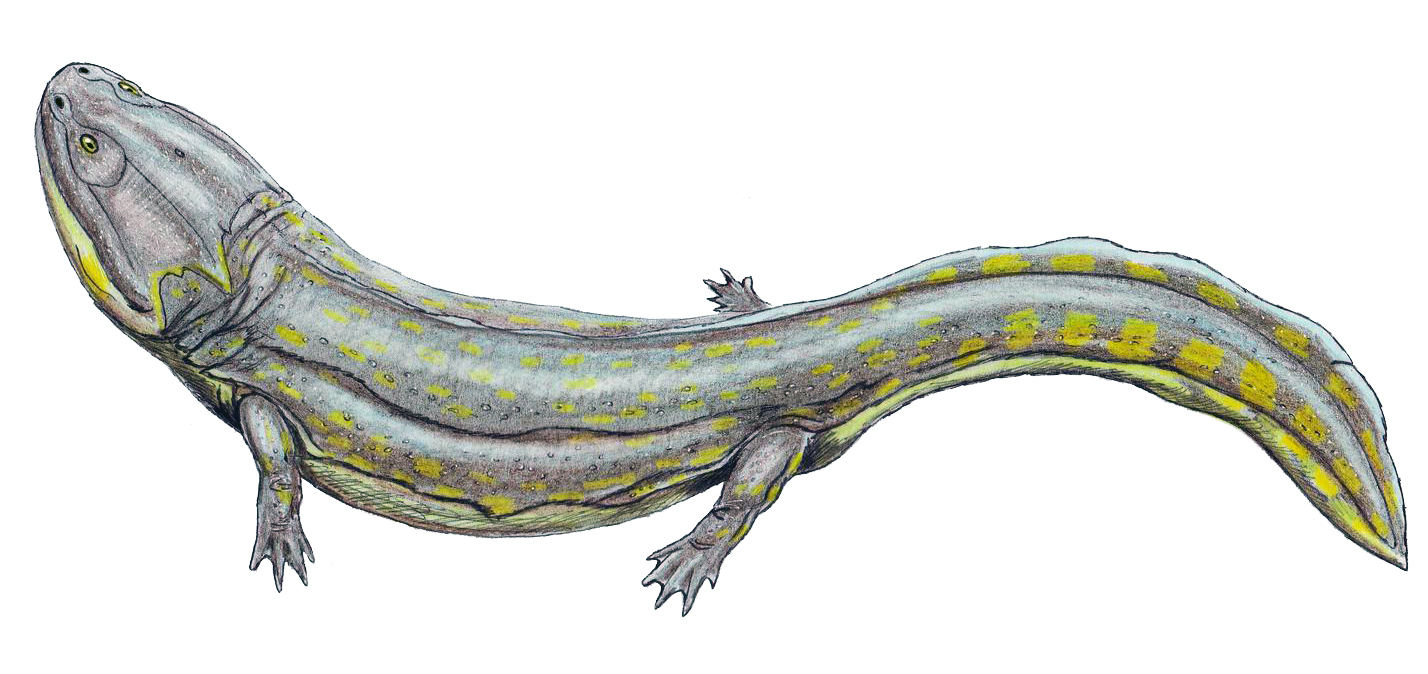
Compsocerops cosgriffi
