= Promastodonsaurus =

Promastodonsaurus Temporal range: Carnian ~231.7–225 Ma

Scientific classification
- Kingdom: Animalia
- Phylum: Chordata
- Clade: Tetrapoda
- Order: †Temnospondyli
- Suborder: †Stereospondyli
- Clade: †Capitosauria
- Family: †Mastodonsauridae
- Genus: †Promastodonsaurus; Bonaparte 1963

Type species
- †Promastodonsaurus bellmani Bonaparte 1963

Extinct genus of temnospondyls

Promastodonsaurus ("before Mastodonsaurus") is an extinct genus of capitosauroid temnospondyls within the family Mastodonsauridae. Fossils of the genus were found in the Ischigualasto Formation of the Ischigualasto-Villa Unión Basin in northwestern Argentina.
