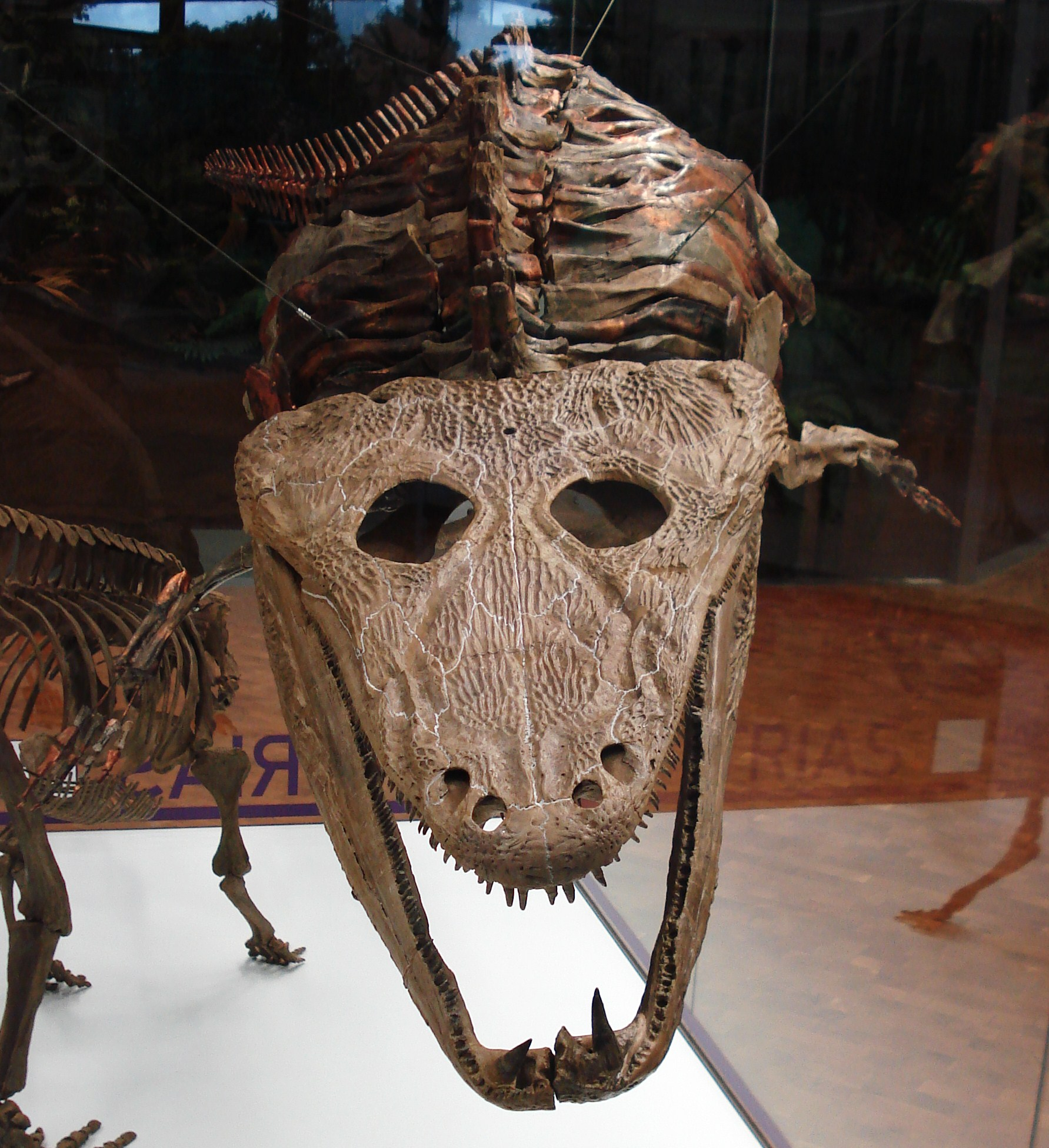
- Skeleton of Mastodonsaurus giganteus in the Staatliches Museum für Naturkunde Stuttgart

Scientific classification
- Kingdom: Animalia
- Phylum: Chordata
- Clade: Tetrapoda
- Order: †Temnospondyli
- Suborder: †Stereospondyli
- Clade: †Capitosauria
- Family: †Mastodonsauridae
- Genus: †Mastodonsaurus; Jaeger, 1828

Type species
- †Mastodonsaurus giganteus (Jaeger, 1828)

Other species
- †M. cappelensis Wepfer, 1923; †M. torvus Konzhukova, 1955

Synonyms
- Batrachosaurus? Fitzinger, 1837; Heptasaurus Säve-Söderbergh, 1935 (likely synonym); Labyrinthodon Owen, 1841; Salamandroides Jaeger, 1828

= Mastodonsaurus =

Mastodonsaurus Temporal range: Middle Triassic

Extinct genus of temnospondyls

Mastodonsaurus (meaning "teat tooth lizard") is an extinct genus of temnospondyl amphibian from the Middle Triassic of Europe. It remains one of the largest amphibians known in the fossil record, and may have exceeded 6 meters (20 feet) in length. Mastodonsaurus belongs to a Triassic group of stereospondyl temnospondyls called Capitosauria, characterized by their large body size, large flattened skulls, and probably predatory aquatic lifestyles analogous to some later crocodilian reptiles.

The gigantic size of Mastodonsaurus made it a top predator in lakes, swamps, river deltas, and other freshwater and brackish aquatic ecosystems. Huge jaws equipped with enlarged fangs and tusks, along with a powerful tail, suggest it was an underwater ambush hunter. Mastodonsaurus would have preyed mainly on fish and on smaller amphibians, but likely took on terrestrial animals that ventured into water as well. Given its heavy body mass and its relatively small limbs, Mastodonsaurus likely could not crawl onto land after reaching larger growth stages.

== Description ==
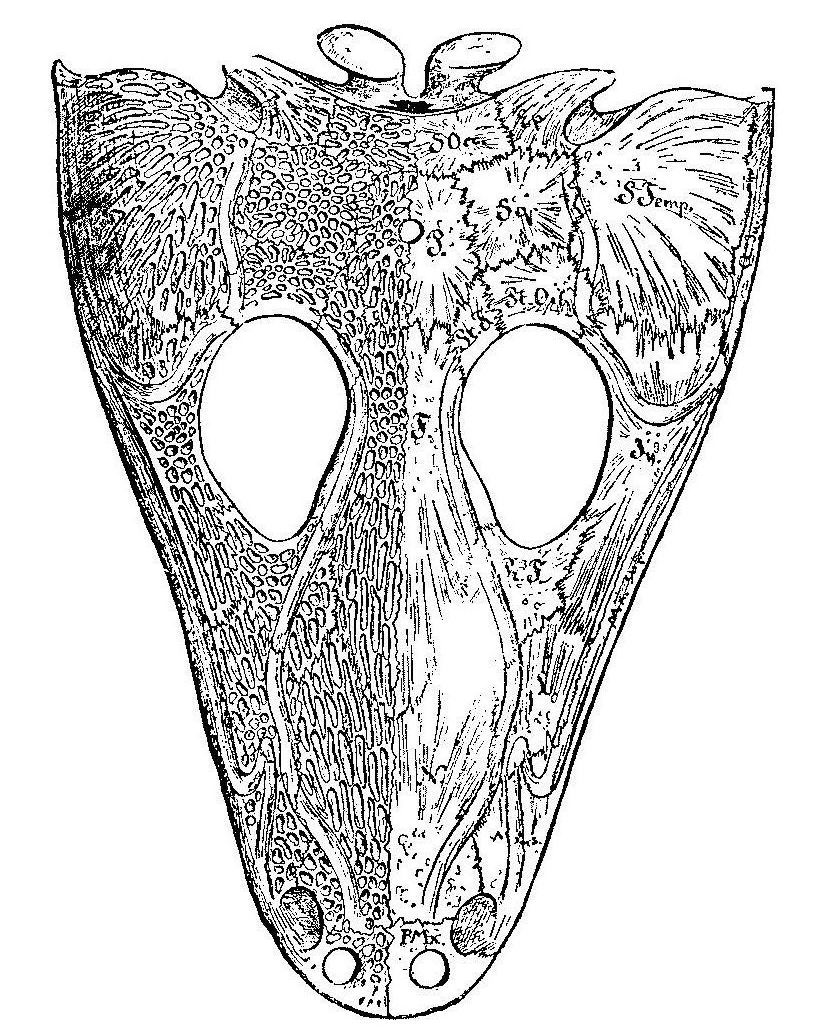
Illustration of Mastodonsaurus skull, showing the "third eye" pineal foramen in the skull roof and the pairs of orbits, nostrils, and mandible tusk openings, as well as sensory sulci on the face and the otic notches and the double condyle to attach to the neck vertebrae at the back of the skull. The left half shows the pitted texture of the skull surface while the other half indicates the separate bones that make up the skull.

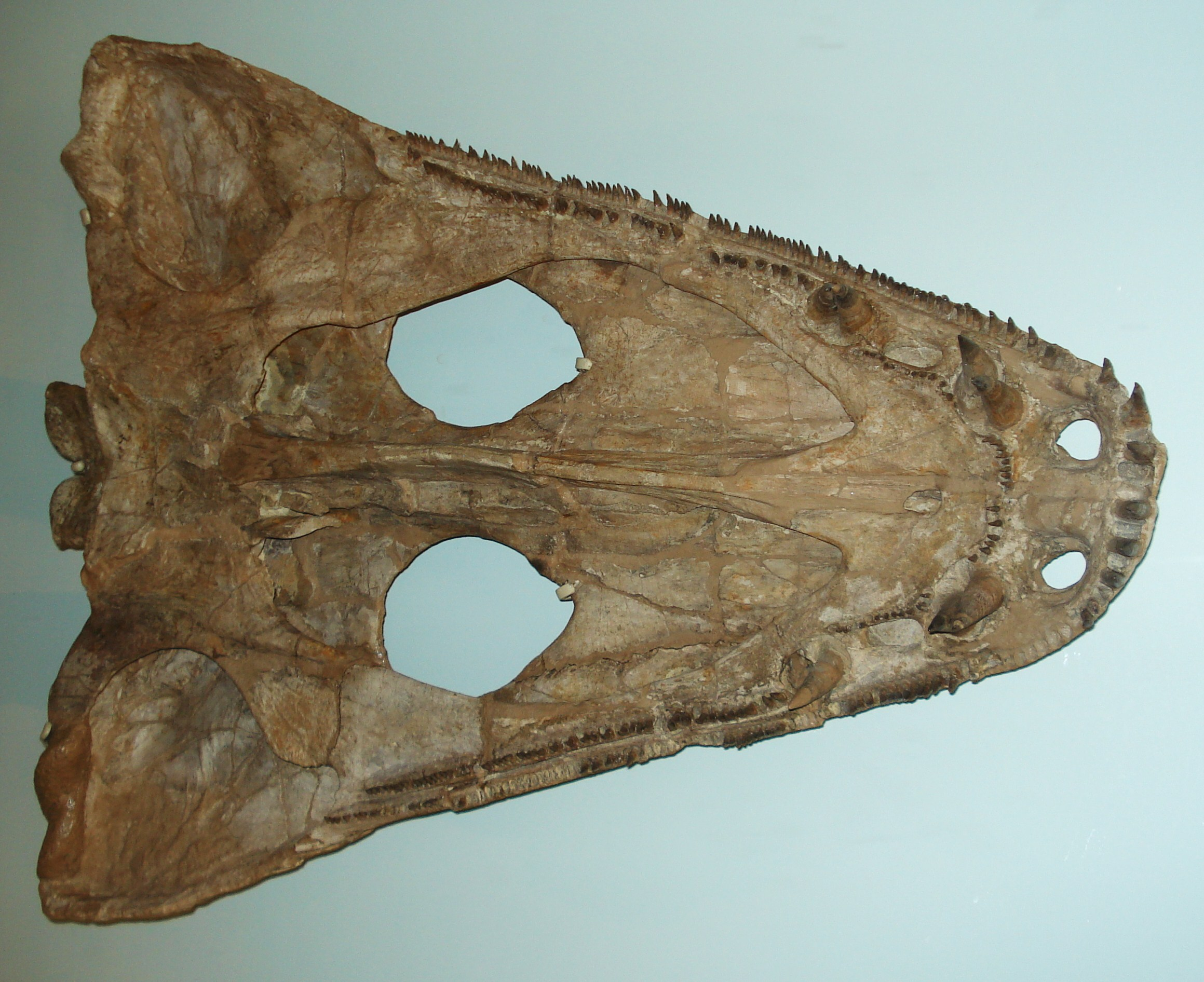
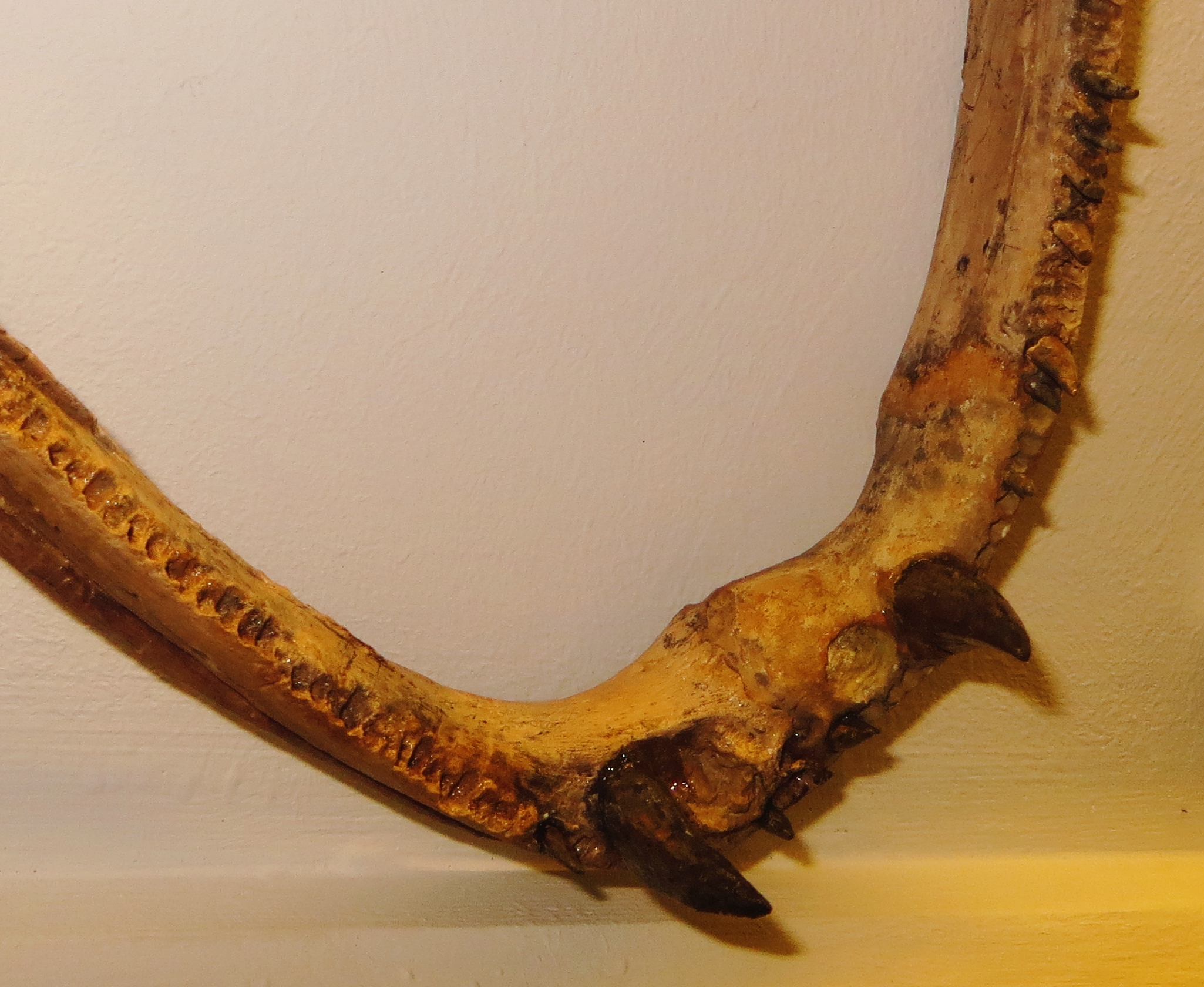
Jaws and teeth of Mastodonsaurus, with skull seen from below (left) showing the double rows of small teeth along the sides, the palate with pairs of large fangs, and two openings at the tip for the pair of tusks (right) at the front end of the lower jaws, which have a single row of small teeth on each side

Like those of many other capitosaurs, the head of Mastodonsaurus was triangular, reaching about 1.5 metres (4.9 ft) in the largest specimens. Narrow grooves on the surface of the skull bones called sulci show it had sensory organs that could detect vibrations and pressure under water, similar to the lateral lines on fish. The large, oval eye sockets are midway along the skull with the nostrils near the tip of the snout. Small ear holes (otic notches) are indented on either side of the back of the skull. The upper surface of the skull bones of Mastodonsaurus bore an intricate pattern of pits and ridges, a feature found in many temnospondyls. The function of this rugged ornamentation is not fully understood. As with other capitosaurs, Mastodonsaurus had a pineal foramen (opening) between the parietal bones behind the orbits on the roof of the skull, which would have contained a light-sensing parietal eye linked to the pineal gland to regulate the circadian sleep-wake cycle and hormone production related to body temperature for a cold-blooded (ectotherm) animal and to reproduction.

The sides of upper jaw are lined with a double row of small conical teeth, while the lower jaw has a single row of similar small teeth. The upper and lower arrangement of small, narrow teeth could function like a trap for small prey when Mastodonsaurus closed its mouth. The tip of the upper jaw has a set of larger teeth. Behind these teeth at the front end of the palate on the underside of the skull are sets of small teeth and multiple pairs of large fangs or tusks (about 8 in all). Two large tusks project up from the end of the lower jaw, fitting through openings on the palate and emerging out from the top of the skull in front of the nostrils when the jaw is closed. The tusk-like teeth on the palate and in the lower jaw could bite and hold bigger prey.

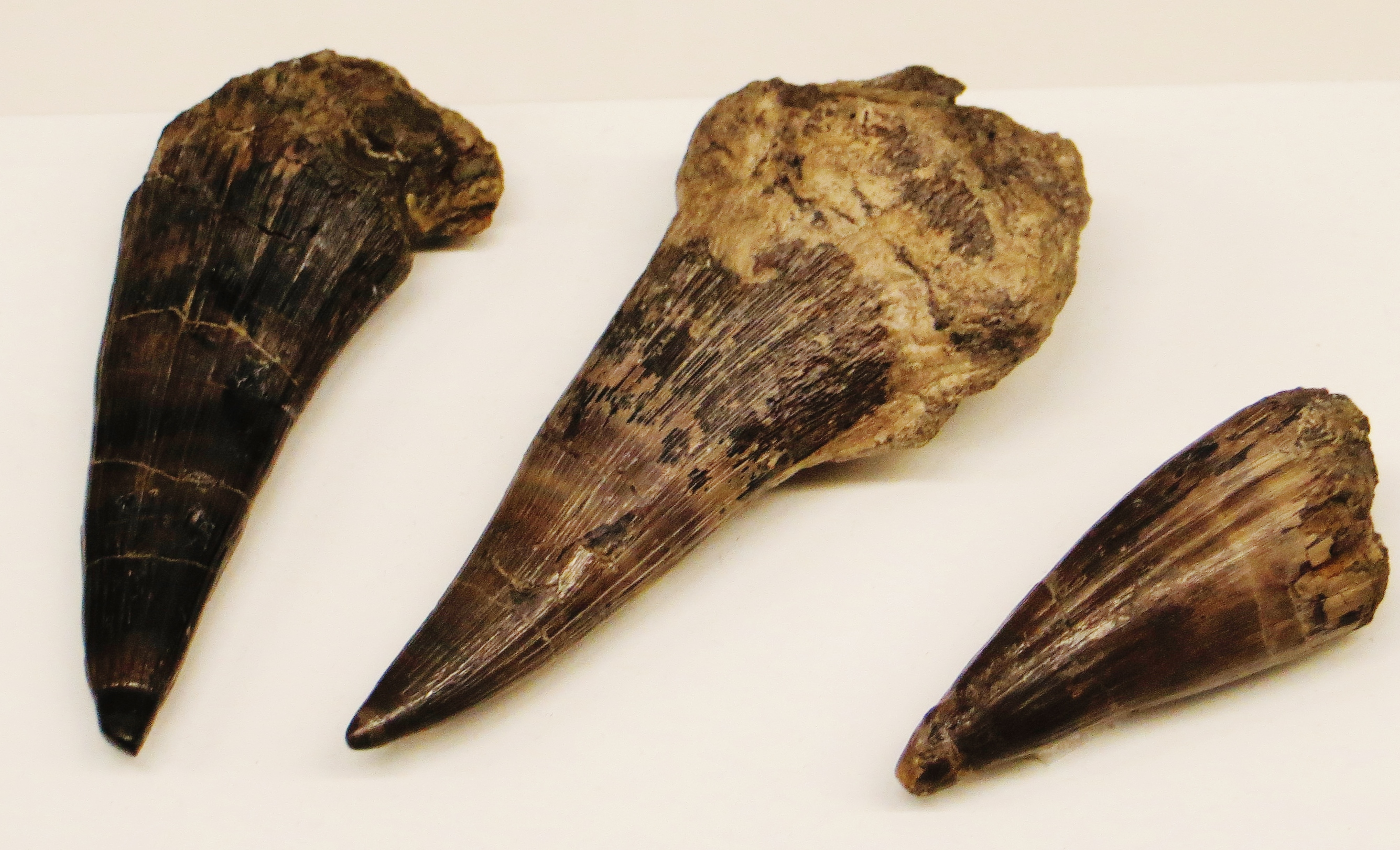
Mastodonsaurus giganteus fangs

Most of the skeleton of Mastodonsaurus, apart from skulls and jaws, remained poorly known until recently. Both scientific and popular sources continued to describe Mastodonsaurus as having a squat, frog-like body and a short tail from the 19th century into the 20th century, including for the "Labyrinthodon" sculptures by Waterhouse Hawkins at the Crystal Palace outside London in 1854 and in a painting of Mastodonsaurus by the famous Czech paleoartist Zdeněk Burian in 1955. A life-size model put on display for the American Museum of Natural History Hall of Vertebrate Origins in 1996 also restored Mastodonsaurus with a short, broad body and a short tail, and so presumably able to crawl on land.

A site discovered during road construction near the town of Kupferzell in southern Germany in 1977 provided researchers with important new fossils of Mastodonsaurus giganteus that included well preserved skulls and disarticulated bones from all parts of the body. Thousands of individual fossils were recovered during a three-month salvage operation before road work resumed, including, in addition to Mastodonsaurus, remains of the temnospondyl Gerrothorax and the archosaur Batrachotomus, as well as of many fishes. Some of the bones showed evidence of being rolled and transported a long distance. Working from the rich Kupferzell finds, German paleontologist Rainer Schoch published a revised description of Mastodonsaurus in 1999 that revealed a longer body and an estimated longer tail, for a larger, more massive animal with a highly aquatic lifestyle. Although no complete and fully articulated skeleton has been found to date, research since 1999 was incorporated into a composite skeletal reconstruction and a fleshed-out model displayed at the Staatliches Museum für Naturkunde Stuttgart in Germany that give Mastodonsaurus more crocodile-like proportions, with a lengthened tail for swimming, similar to some other capitosaurs.

The exact number of vertebrae in the skeleton is still not known but recent research shows that Mastodonsaurus had about 28 trunk vertebrae and a relatively long tail, revised from the squat body shape and short tail assumed in earlier reconstructions. The total length of the largest individuals is about 4 to 6 metres (13 to 20 ft). Isolated teeth up to 14 cm (6 in) long indicate that old individuals grew even larger.

== Paleobiology ==
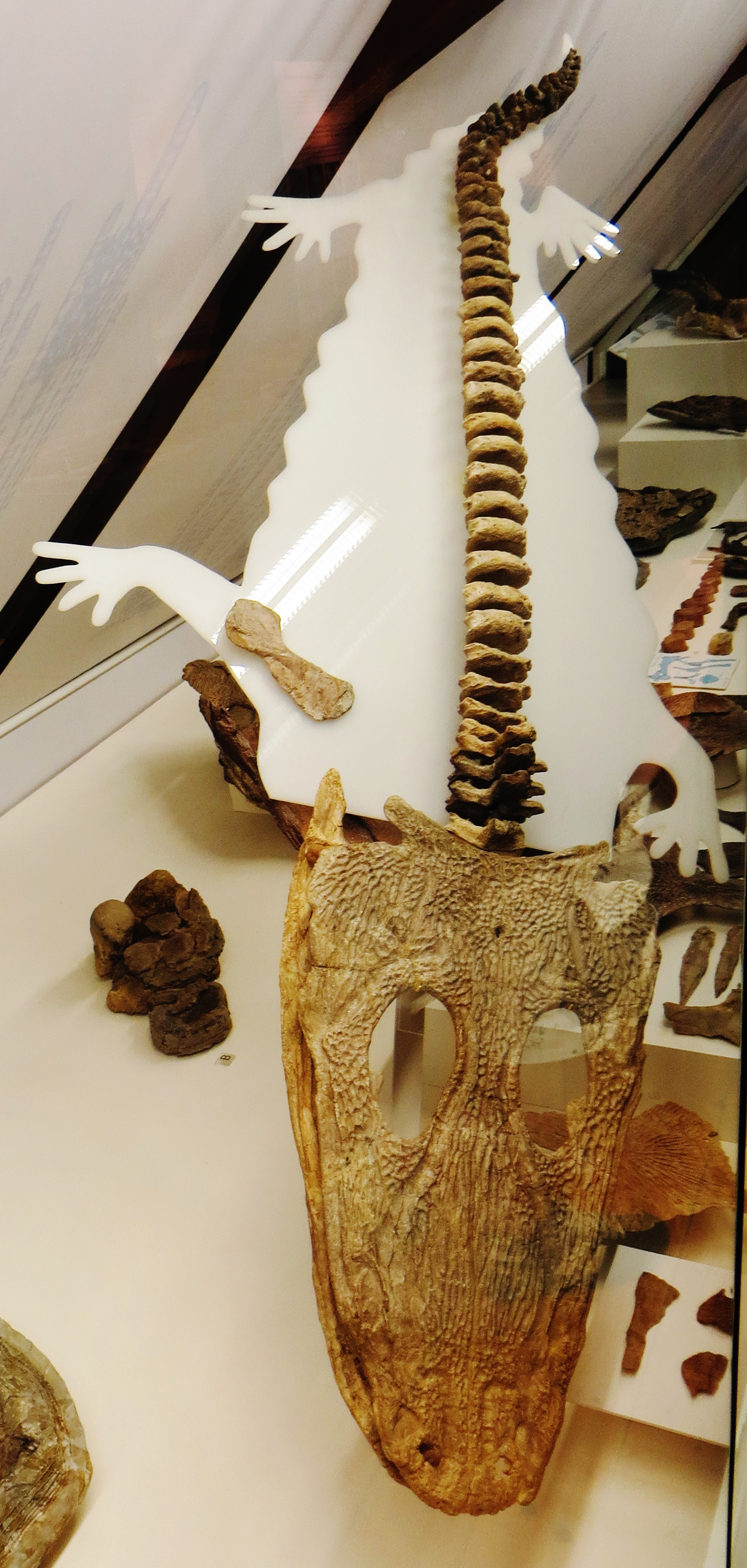
Fossil remains of M. giganteus at the Muschelkalkmuseum

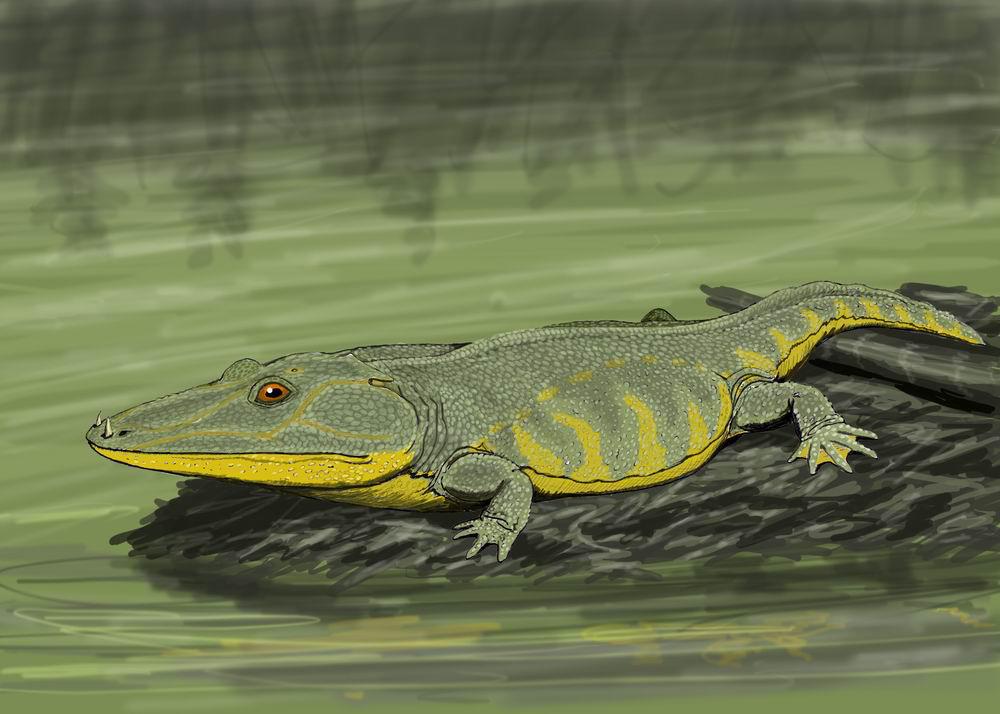
Life restoration with exposed tusks (top) and scale diagram (bottom) – the tail was likely longer than depicted.

The marked reduction of the limbs, the strong tail and sensory grooves on the head called sulci show that Mastodonsaurus was an aquatic animal that rarely, if ever, ventured on land. Mastodonsaurus may have been completely unable to leave the water, as large quantities of bones have been found that suggest individuals died en masse when pools dried up during times of drought. It normally inhabited freshwater to brackish swamps, lakes, and river deltas. Fossil skull remains found in marine sediments suggest it also may have entered into saltier environments on occasion.

Its tail was likely thickened with a fleshy fin for propulsion. The stronger tail in combination with small limbs, a trunk section stiffened with long, broadened, overlapping ribs, and extra-heavy bones would indicate that Mastodonsaurus was an aquatic ambush predator that lurked on the bottom in wait for prey, making sudden, rapid attacks with its giant mouth and impaling tusks, propelled by its tail. A 2026 study reconstructed the musculature on the skull and supported a mainly ramming crocodile-like "bite-and-hold" method of grabbing prey. However, the muscle configuration also suggested jaw opening and closing abilities with suction effects, likely indicating a "more balanced position" between ramming and suction modes of aquatic predation in Mastodonsaurus and other capitosaurs. In addition, Mastodonsaurus apparently had a relatively weak and not very flexible tongue.

Mastodonsaurus fed mainly on fish, whose remains have been found in its fossilized coprolites. The fossils of some smaller temnospondyls bear tooth marks made by Mastodonsaurus-like animals and there is evidence for cannibalism by adults on juveniles of Mastodonsaurus. It probably also ate land-living animals, such as small archosaurs that ventured into or along the edge of water. Bite marks on Mastodonsaurus bones show that the large terrestrial archosaur Batrachotomus actively preyed on the giant amphibians, entering the water or attacking individuals stranded in pools during droughts.

The growth stages of Mastodonsaurus are documented from numerous specimens found at Kupferzell and elsewhere in Germany, with skulls that range from about 1.5 cm (~0.5 in) up through 125 cm (50 in) long. Stereospondyls lacked a true larval stage of development and Mastodonsaurus followed a slow, conservative ontogenetic pattern with relatively minor changes as it grew so that small juveniles would have resembled adults.

== History and naming ==
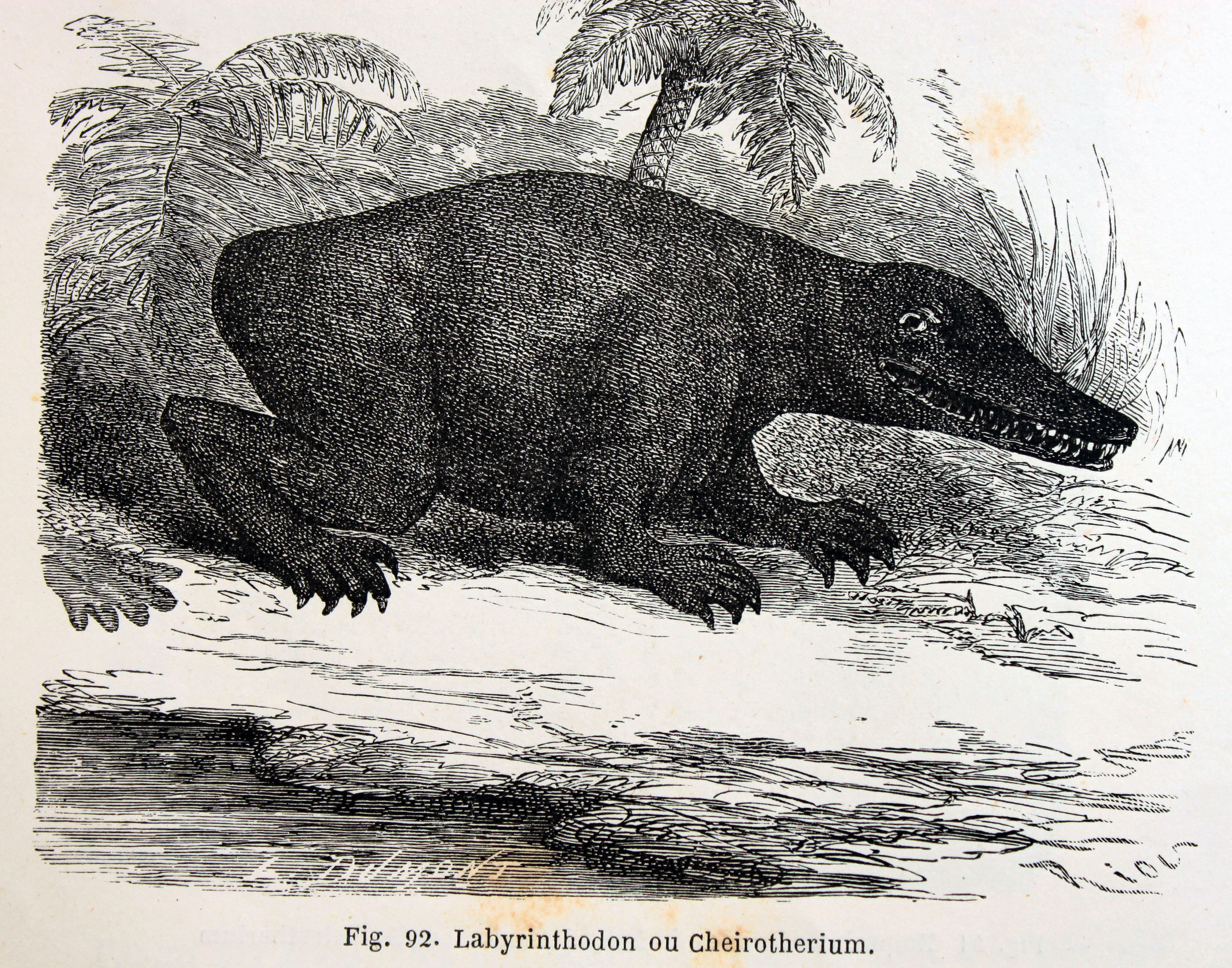
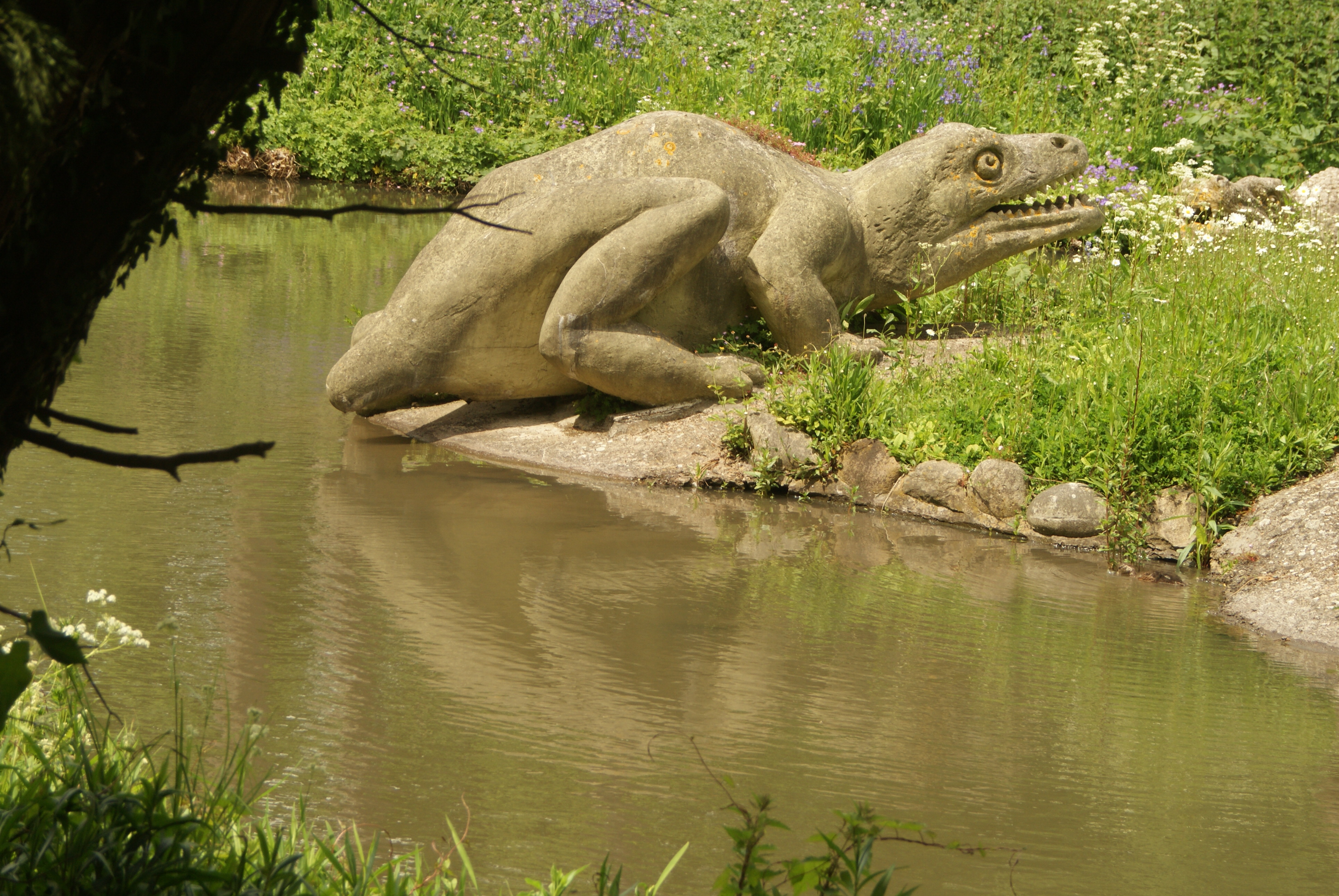
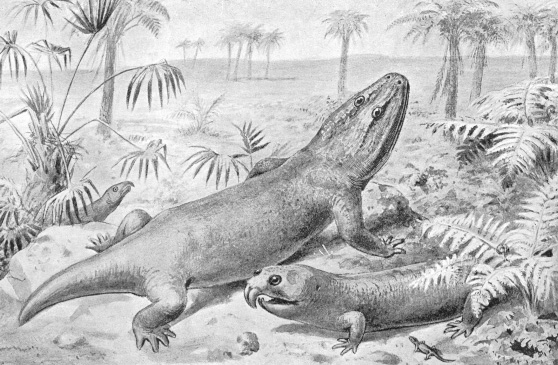
Reconstructions of Mastodonsaurus through the 19th century:
- top left: "Labyrinthodon or Cheirotherium" (1863)
- top right: Labyrinthodon at the Crystal Palace (1854)
- bottom: Mastodonsaurus and Hyperodapedon (1894)

The German paleontologist Georg Friedrich von Jaeger gave the name Mastodonsaurus in 1828 to a single large conical fang with vertical striations and a worn-off tip, found in the Triassic Lettenkeuper deposits near Gaildorf in Baden-Württemberg in southern Germany. Jaeger assumed the big tooth (a snout fang about 10.4 cm (4.1 in) long as preserved) belonged to a giant reptile and that the indented missing tip was a distinctive natural feature that, when viewed from above, resembled a nipple or teat with a small hole in the middle, which he expressed in the name Mastodonsaurus or "teat tooth lizard" (from Greek mastos "breast, nipple" + odous (odon) "tooth" + sauros "lizard"): "Dieser Zahn ist nämlich besonders ausgezeichnet durch seine zitzenartige Spitze." [This tooth namely is especially distinguished by its teat-like tip.] He illustrated the tooth and its "teat-like" tip in a plate (Plate IV, figure 4). However, Jaeger did not provide a type species name for Mastodonsaurus.

Also in 1828, Jaeger identified the back part or occiput of a large skull found in the same area as coming from a giant amphibian-like animal as indicated by the double articulation of the occipital condyles. He gave the creature the genus-species name combination Salamandroides giganteus, meaning "gigantic salamander-like (animal)".

The discovery of a complete skull of Mastodonsaurus near Gaildorf in 1833 showed that the teeth and occiput came from the same kind of animal, as later noted by Jaeger.

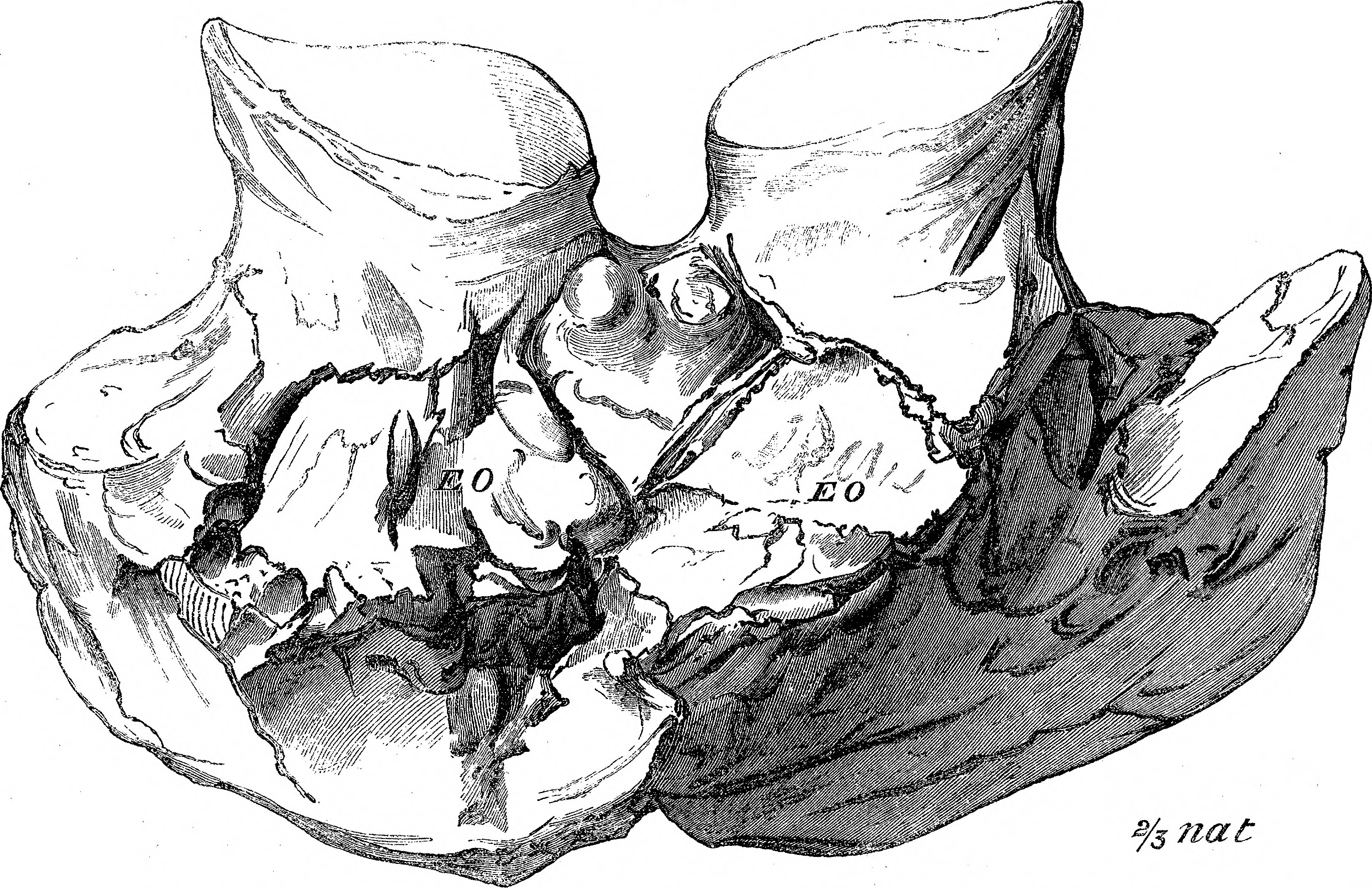
Illustration of Mastodonsaurus holotype occiput, originally identified as Salamandroides giganteus

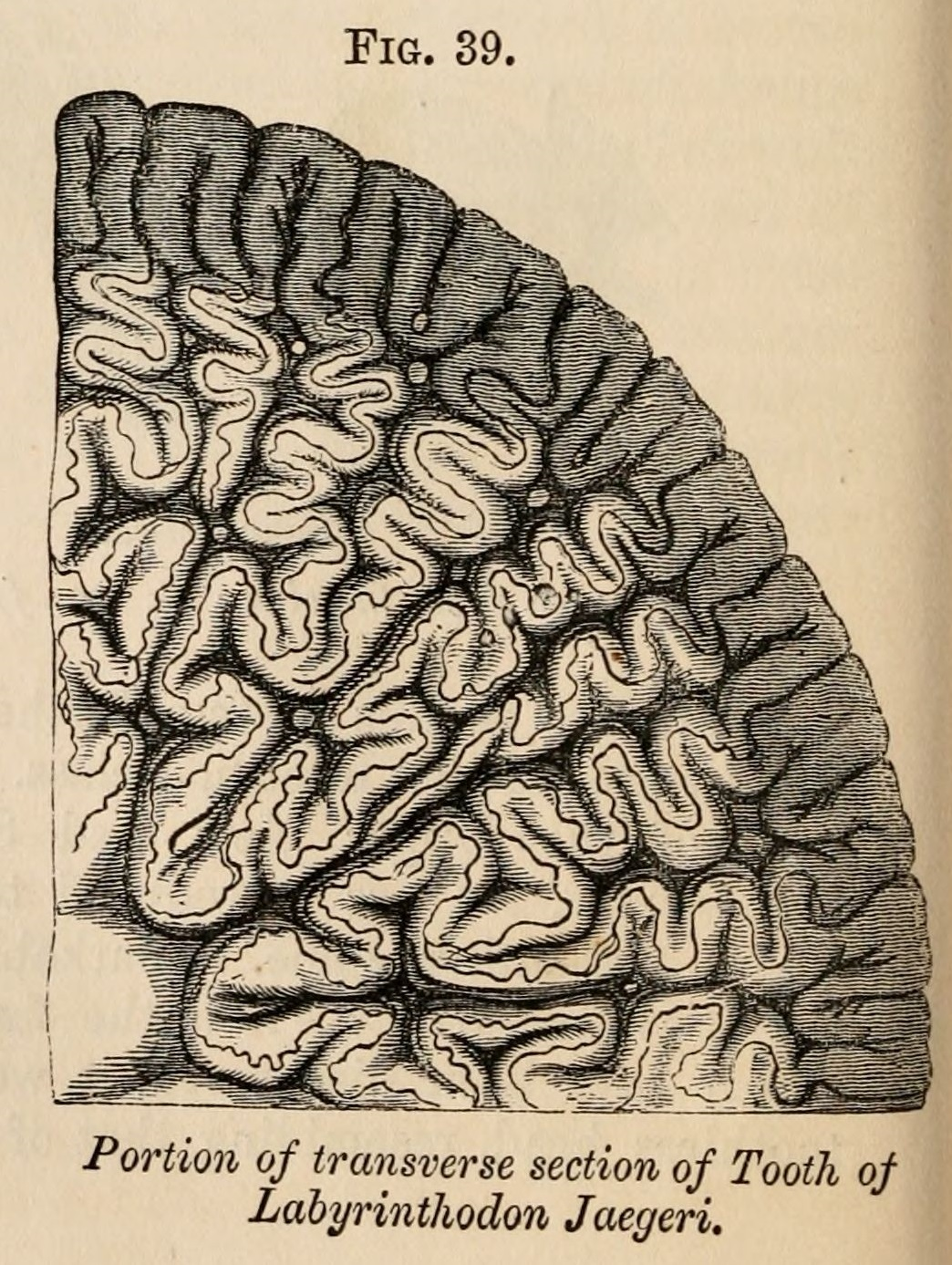
19th century illustration of the complex inner structure of a Labyrinthodon [Mastodonsaurus] tooth

The name Mastodonsaurus has led to confusion over its intended meaning, and as pointed out by the British paleontologist Richard Owen, the name could be misinterpreted as a reference to the extinct proboscidean mastodon, supposedly to suggest gigantic size ("mastodon(-size) lizard"), the false meaning given in some sources.

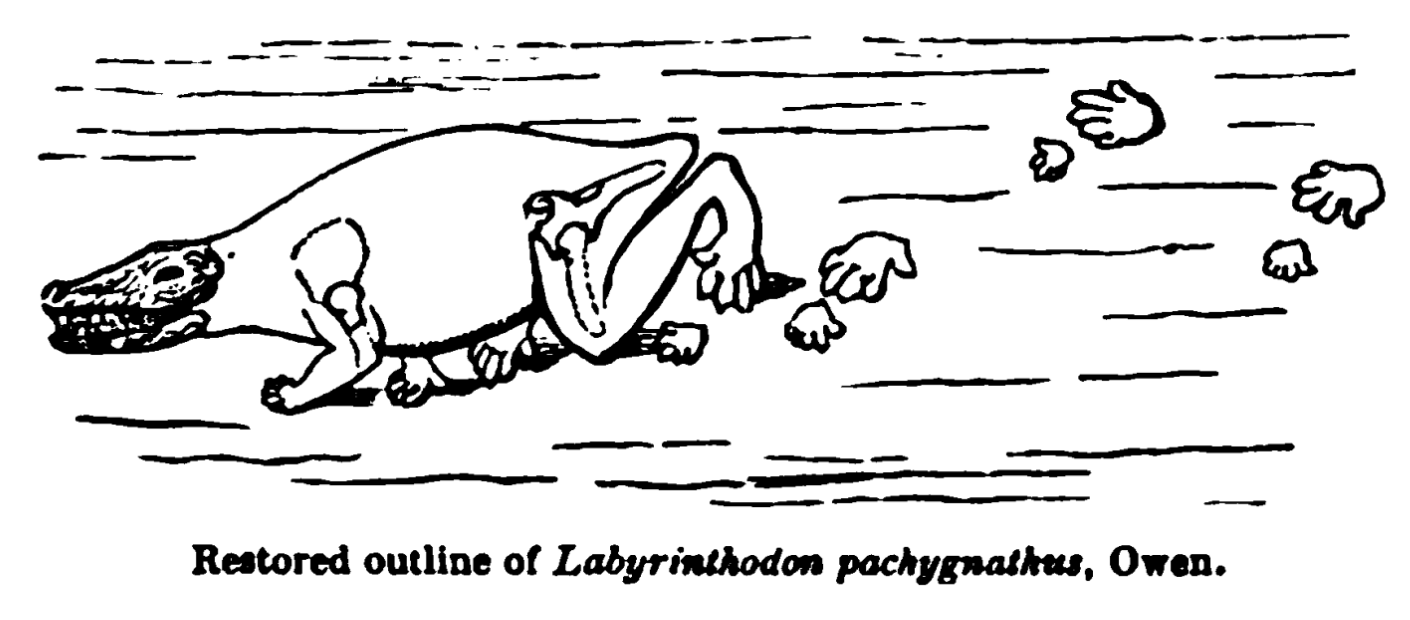
1855 proposed life reconstruction based on paleontologist Richard Owen of a "Labyrinthodon" as the maker of Chirotherium tracks, walking with crossed limbs to match the outer "thumb" impression and with misidentified skeletal parts taken from archosaurs, but with a Mastodonsaurus skull

Owen noted that the teat-like appearance was not a real diagnostic feature and also objected to the term "saurus" for a "batrachian" (amphibian). He proposed what he thought was the more fitting replacement name Labyrinthodon or "labyrinth tooth" to refer to the complex maze-like appearance of the inner tooth structure when viewed in cross section. However, the rules of zoological nomenclature require that the earliest name established be used and Labyrinthodon is a junior synonym of Mastodonsaurus. The maze-like inner tooth structure in Mastodonsaurus is found in multiple types of extinct amphibians, and Richard Owen created the formal taxonomic category Labyrinthodontia (published in 1860) as a supposed order of "Reptilia" to unite them. However, the "order" turned out to contain multiple types of animals that are not closely related and the category Labyrinthodontia no longer has recognized scientific status, although the general form "labyrinthodont" is still used as a descriptive term.

Mastodonsaurus was once thought to be responsible for the footprints found in Triassic sandstones and described as Chirotherium, but later research found that the tracks belong to crocodile-like pseudosuchian reptiles like the aforementioned Batrachotomus or Ticinosuchus. Based on the misattributed tracks and misidentified bones from other Triassic animals, early illustrations depicted the giant amphibians (often referred to as "Labyrinthodon" at the time) as big froglike creatures that supposedly crossed their legs as they walked since the outer fifth digit on the Chirotherium footprints resembled a thumb.

== Species and classification ==
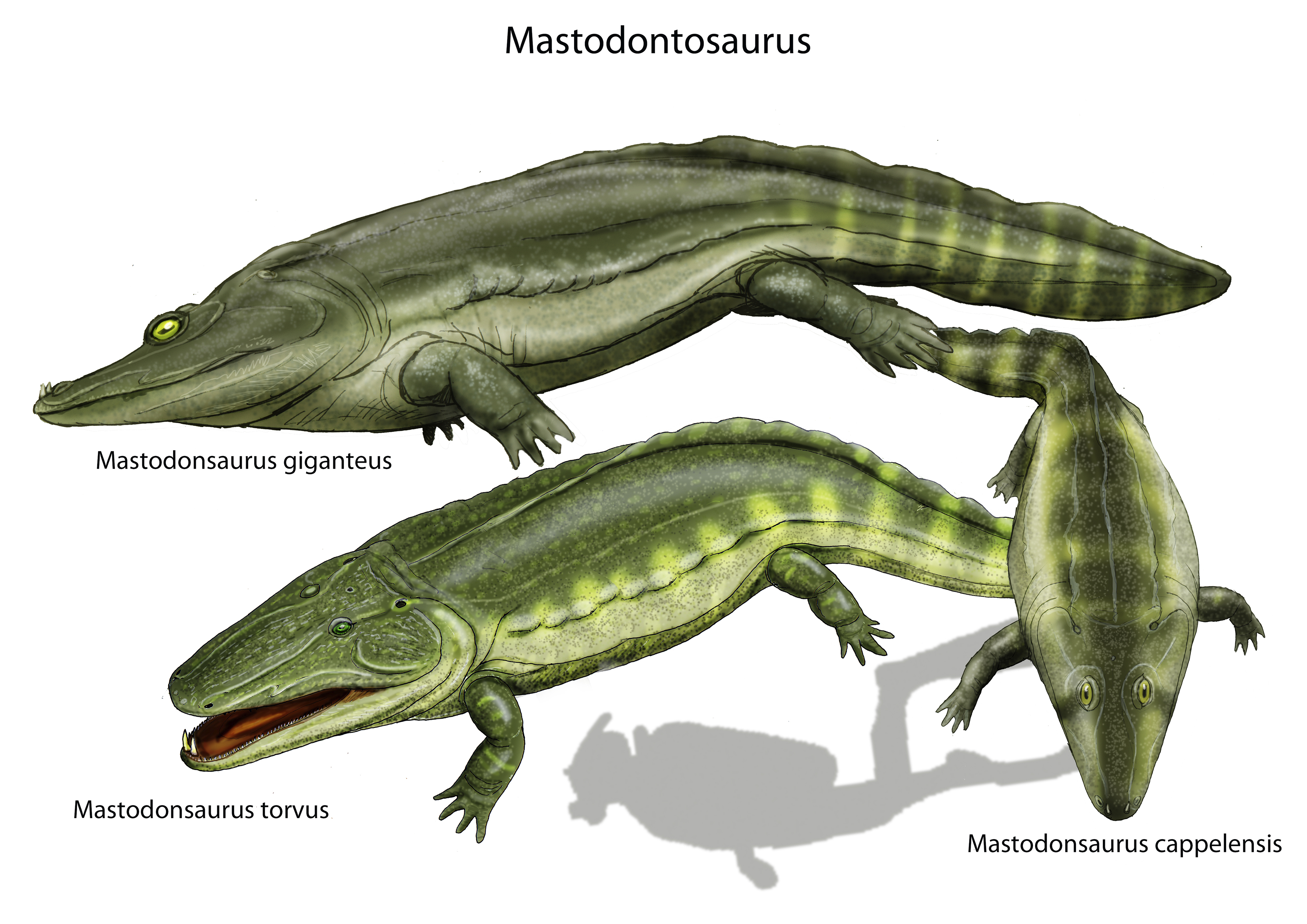
Three species of Mastodonsaurus compared in size ("Mastodonsaurus" torvus may be a separate genus)

After recognition by Jaeger in 1833 that the original Mastodonsaurus tooth and the Salamandroides giganteus occiput fossil were from different individuals of the same species of animal, based on the discovery of the complete skull, most authors used the binomial combination Mastodonsaurus giganteus as the type species. In recent work, German paleontologist Rainer R. Schoch has recognized Mastodonsaurus giganteus (Jaeger 1828) as the official type species, with the occiput (GPIT Am 678) as the holotype specimen, considered diagnostic. This revises an earlier reexamination of the genus by Markus Moser and Rainer Schoch in 2007, in which they chose M. jaegeri Holl from 1829 as the historically oldest type species for Mastodonsaurus, designating Jaeger's original tooth (SMNS 55911) as the lectotype of Mastodonsaurus jaegeri. Holl had treated Mastodonsaurus and Salamandroides as distinct and unrelated animals (a reptile (from the tooth) and an amphibian (from the back of a skull) respectively), in line with Jaeger's first descriptions of the fossils in 1828. Schoch now lists M. jaegeri as a junior synonym of Mastodonsaurus giganteus.

Moser and Schoch (2007) had noted that the best-known species, M. giganteus, could be a senior synonym of M. jaegeri if the two species are not taxonomically distinct. They also recognized the species M. torvus from Russia. However, they found that the species M. acuminatus was a junior synonym to M. giganteus, while the species M. tantus & M. maximus were synonyms of M. torvus. The species M. andriani, M. indicus, M. laniarius, M. lavisi, M. meyeri, M. pachygnathus and M. silesiacus, when reexamined by Moser and Schoch, were not deemed assignable to the genus Mastodonsaurus due to the fragmentary nature of the type specimens and as such are considered nomen dubium. Examination of the literature showed M. conicus to be a senior synonym of the genus M. ventricosus; however this species was never formally published and is thus considered a nomen nudum.

In 1923, German paleontologist Emil Wepfer described the new species Mastodonsaurus cappelensis for fossils found near the town of Kappel in Baden-Württemberg in an older formation than remains of Mastodonsaurus giganteus. Swedish paleontologist Gunnar Säve-Söderbergh erected the new genus Heptasaurus ("seven lizard" for seven skull openings) for the species in 1935. In his review of Mastodonsaurus, Rainer Schoch (1999) recognized Heptasaurus as a genus that was distinct from Mastodonsaurus, with "smaller orbits and a markedly broader snout tip", and that was found in the Middle and Upper Buntsandstein Formation, earlier than fossils of Mastodonsaurus giganteus.

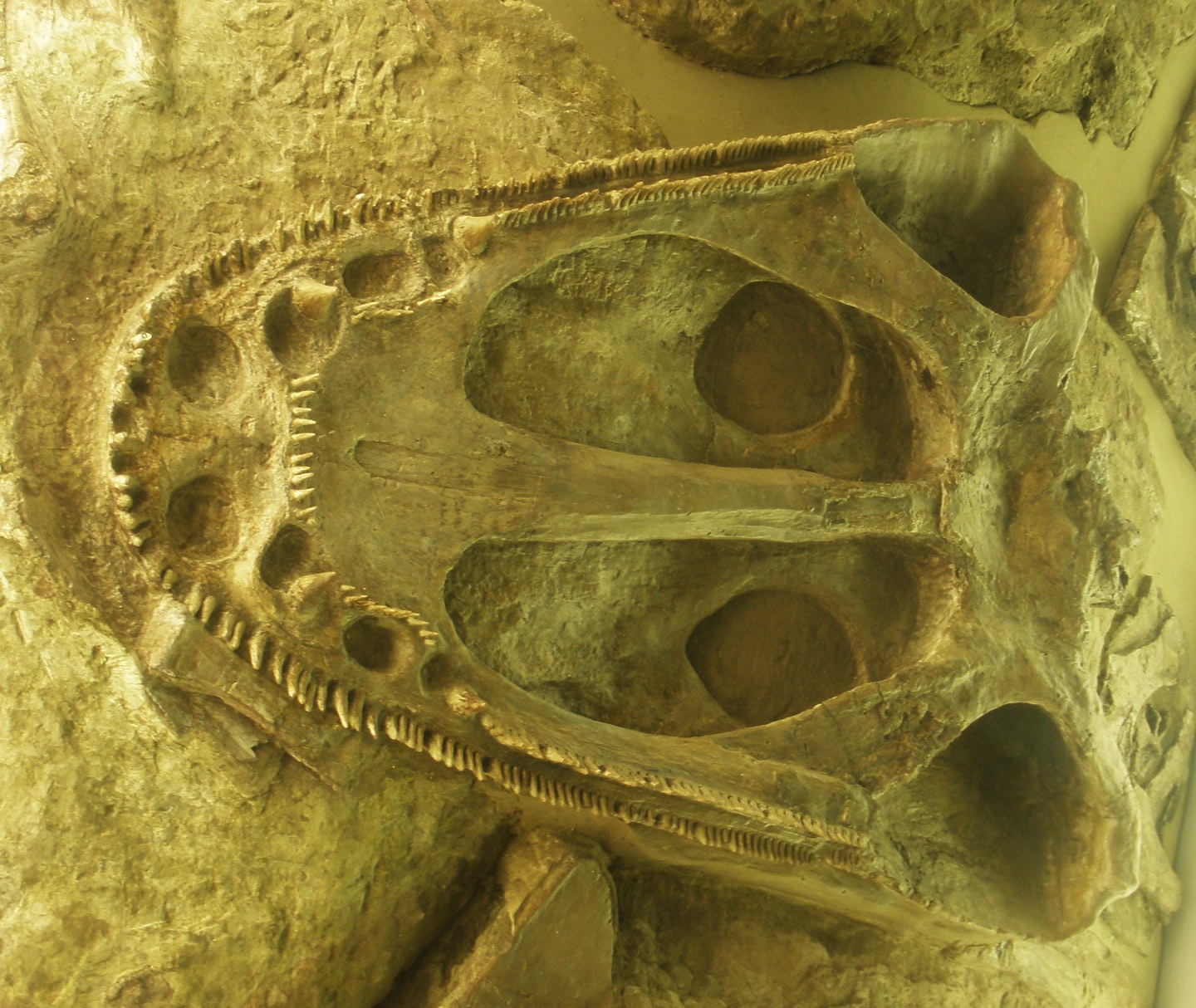
Underside of the skull of Mastodonsaurus [Heptasaurus] cappelensis in the Naturmuseum Senckenberg in Frankfurt am Main in Germany

This analysis was questioned by Damiani (2001), who used the original name Mastodonsaurus cappelensis for the species. Moser and Schoch (2007) continued to accept the valid status of the genus Heptasaurus but noted that the species "could also be re-referred to Mastodonsaurus". Rayfield, Barrett & Milner (2009) pointed out that the skull and size differences between Heptasaurus and Mastodonsaurus may not be important diagnostic features at a generic level.

In more recent research, Schoch has restored the combination Mastodonsaurus cappelensis for the geologically older species, noting in 2008 that "present evidence indicates close ties with Mastodonsaurus giganteus, which is why this species is here referred to Mastodonsaurus". A revised description of Mastodonsaurus cappelensis by Schoch and others in 2023 indicated that the earlier species was 3 meters long and differed from M. giganteus in having a wider snout and differently shaped orbits, as well as a longer and more gracile humerus. The Mastodonsaurus lineage evolved larger tusks and stronger jaws over time to deal with more types of prey, becoming a dominant predator in lake-related ecosystems.

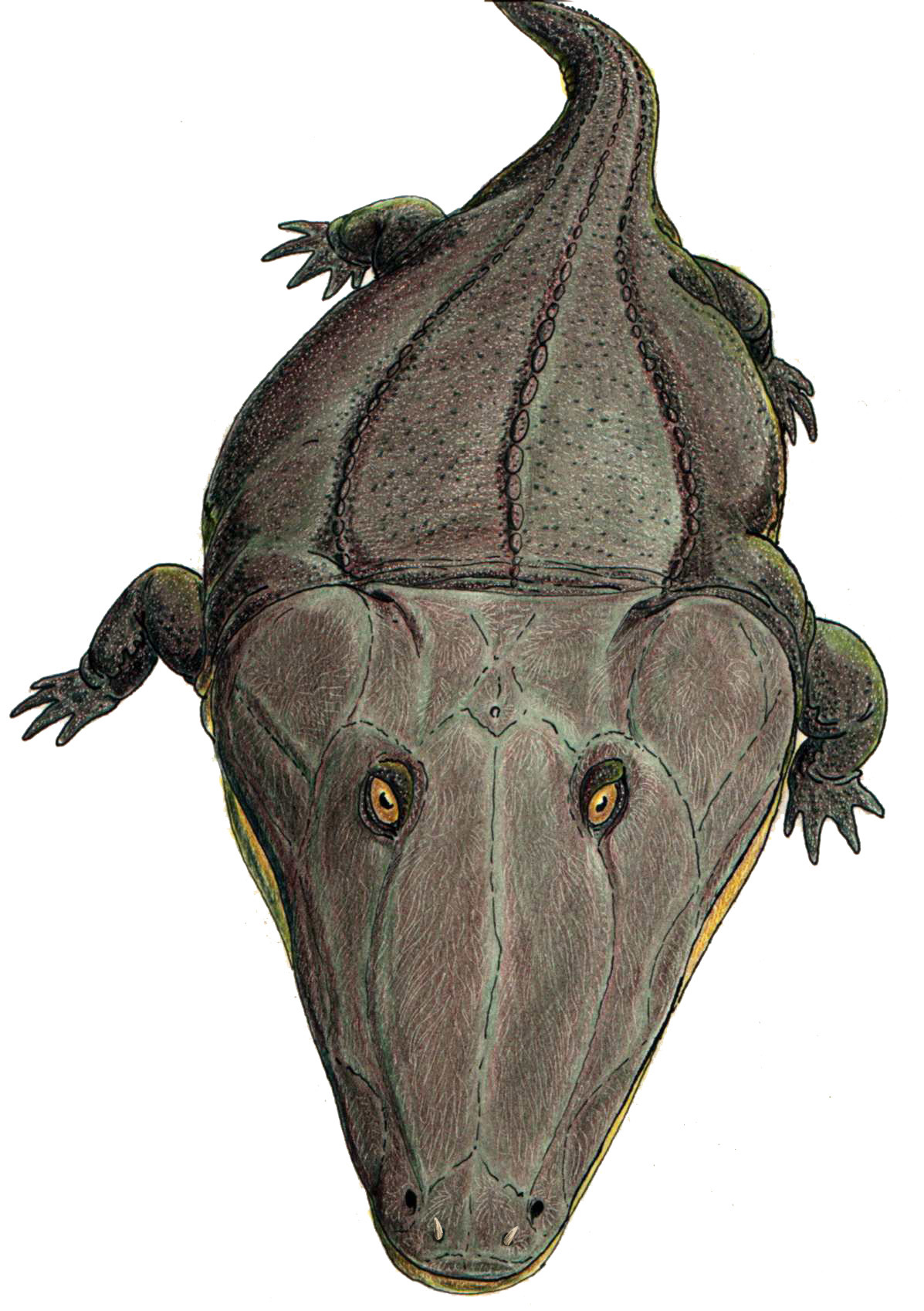
A reconstruction of M. torvus

The species Mastodonsaurus torvus was described in 1955 by Russian paleontologist Elena Dometevna Konzhukova (wife of paleontologist Ivan Yefremov) based on a lower jaw fragment (holotype PIN 415/1) and other bones unearthed near the village of Koltaevo in Bashkortostan in the Southern Urals in Middle Triassic beds that are part of the Bukobay Svita in Russia. Additional fossils of very large mastodonsaurids have been discovered as well at Middle Triassic sites in the Orenburg Oblast in Russia and in northern Kazakhstan. In 1972, Russian paleontologist Leonid Petrovich Tatarinov found a complete skull (measuring 1.25 meters long) on an expedition to Koltaevo. The giant skull is on display at the Orlov Paleontological Museum (specimen PIN 2867/67) in Moscow in Russia and has been labeled Mastodonsaurus torvus, although some sources cite the specimen as Mastodonsaurus sp. instead. A full scientific description has not been published yet, but differences from Mastodonsaurus giganteus include smaller orbits positioned further back on the skull.

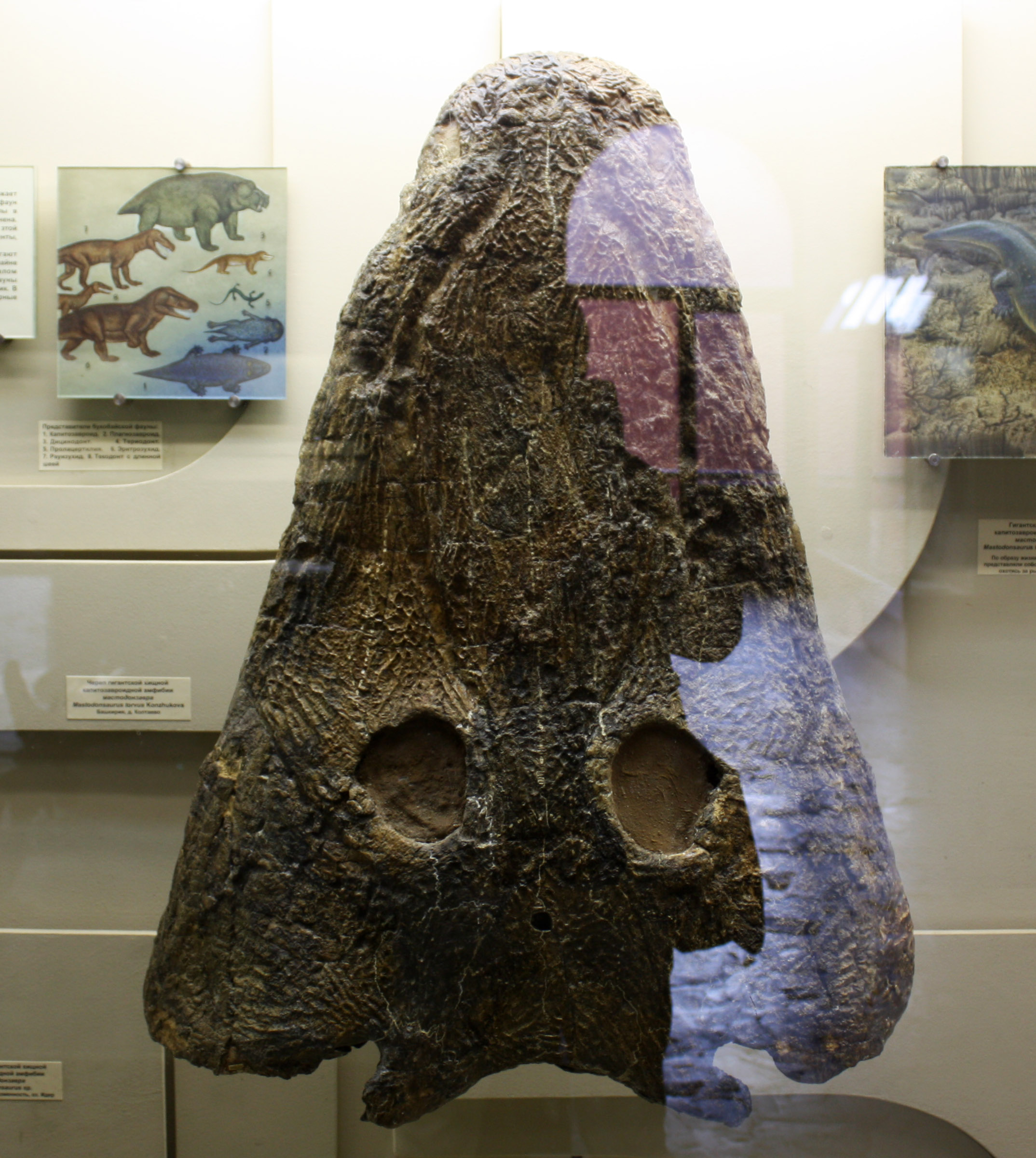
Complete skull (PIN 2867/67) assigned to Mastodonsaurus, found in 1972 in the Southern Urals, on display at the Orlov Paleontological Museum in Moscow

Researchers debate the generic classification of the Russian fossils, sometimes referring to them as "Mastodonsaurus" in quotes or with a question mark (?) to indicate that further study may justify placement in a different or in a new genus. A phylogenetic analysis by Schoch and others in 2023 nested the giant Russian taxon closest to species of the related genus Eryosuchus, a large temnospondyl known from the Middle Triassic of northern Russia.

=== Formerly assigned species ===
- Mastodonsaurus cappelensis = valid (or Heptasaurus)
- Mastodonsaurus vaslenensis = possible "heptasaurid"
- Mastodonsaurus granulosus = Plagiosternum
- Mastodonsaurus arenaceus = Capitosaurus
- Mastodonsaurus robustus = Cyclotosaurus
- Mastodonsaurus durus = Eupelor (metoposaurid)
- Mastodonsaurus keuperinus = mix of Metoposaurus and indeterminate mastodonsaurid material
- Mastodonsaurus weigelti = junior synonym of Parotosuchus
- Labyrinthodon leptognathus = Stereospondyli indeterminate

=== Classification ===
Mastodonsaurus is classified in the Mastodonsauridae within the Capitosauria, a division of the Stereospondyli clade of the Temnospondyli. Schoch et al. (2023) provided a cladogram of the Capitosauria to position Mastodonsaurus relative to other genera. Their cladogram is shown in part in modified form below. The placement of the giant Russian taxon from Koltaevo, historically referred to as Mastodonsaurus torvus and known primarily from a skull (PIN 2867/67), remains in question, pending a full description. Schoch et al. (2023) found that it was closer to Eryosuchus than to Mastodonsaurus.

A modified partial cladogram of the Capitosauria from Schoch et al. (2023), showing the proposed placement of Mastodonsaurus species:

- - Xenotosuchus
  - - Kupferzellia
    - - Stanocephalosaurus
      - - Paracyclotosaurus
        - Calmasuchus
        - - - Yuanansuchus
            - - Mastodonsaurus cappelensis
              - Mastodonsaurus giganteus
              - - Koltaevo taxon ("Mastodonsaurus torvus" skull)
                - - Eryosuchus garjainovi
                  - Eryosuchus tverdokhlebovi
