= Rhadalognathus =

Rhadalognathus Temporal range: Triassic

Scientific classification
- Kingdom: Animalia
- Phylum: Chordata
- Clade: Tetrapoda
- Order: †Temnospondyli
- Suborder: †Stereospondyli
- Clade: †Capitosauria
- Family: †Mastodonsauridae
- Genus: †Rhadalognathus

Species
- †R. boweni

Extinct genus of amphibians

Rhadalognathus was a prehistoric crocodile-like amphibian that belongs to the Mastodonsauridae family. Not much is known about this creature but it lived in the Triassic period. Rhadalognathus is also the name of the genus in which the organism belongs within. Rhadalognathus was found in northern Arizona, US, by S. P. Welles in 1947. The size of the organism is unknown but its skull is about 17in long and weighs 7lbs.
