= Abiadisaurus =

Abiadisaurus Temporal range: Late Triassic or Early Jurassic

Scientific classification
- Kingdom: Animalia
- Phylum: Chordata
- Clade: Tetrapoda
- Order: †Temnospondyli
- Suborder: †Stereospondyli
- Clade: †Capitosauria
- Family: †Mastodonsauridae
- Genus: †Abiadisaurus; Warren et al., 1998

Type species
- A. witteni Warren et al., 1998

Extinct genus of amphibians

Abiadisaurus is an extinct genus of prehistoric amphibians from the Temnospondyli clade, considered to be a member or a relative of the family Mastodonsauridae. It is known solely from the Late Triassic or Early Jurassic Adigrat Sandstone northwest of Abi Adi, Tigray, Ethiopia. The Age debate of this taxon comes in part due to the fact the Adigrat Sandstone is believed to be diachronous, with a top age of Callovian(?) to early Oxfordian marine Antalo Limestone and the Hamanlei Formation, but some beds overlie Paleozoic formations. These sandstones were deposited on top of the partially eroded Triassic surface, primarily in fluvial or piedmont environments, but also in fluviolacustrine and deltaic settings.

== Description ==
Abiadisaurus is known only from a left jawbone within the collection of the University of California Museum of Paleontology (UCMP 154459 is its designation), first described in 1998. The mandible is notable for its unusually wide shelf on the dentary and its dorso-ventrally compressed structure. It was tentatively classified as belonging to the Capitosauroidea, mainly due to its teeth, which are closely packed and compressed from front to back, however this dental characteristic is an advanced feature of the mastodonsauroids.

== See also ==
- Prehistoric amphibian
- List of prehistoric amphibians
