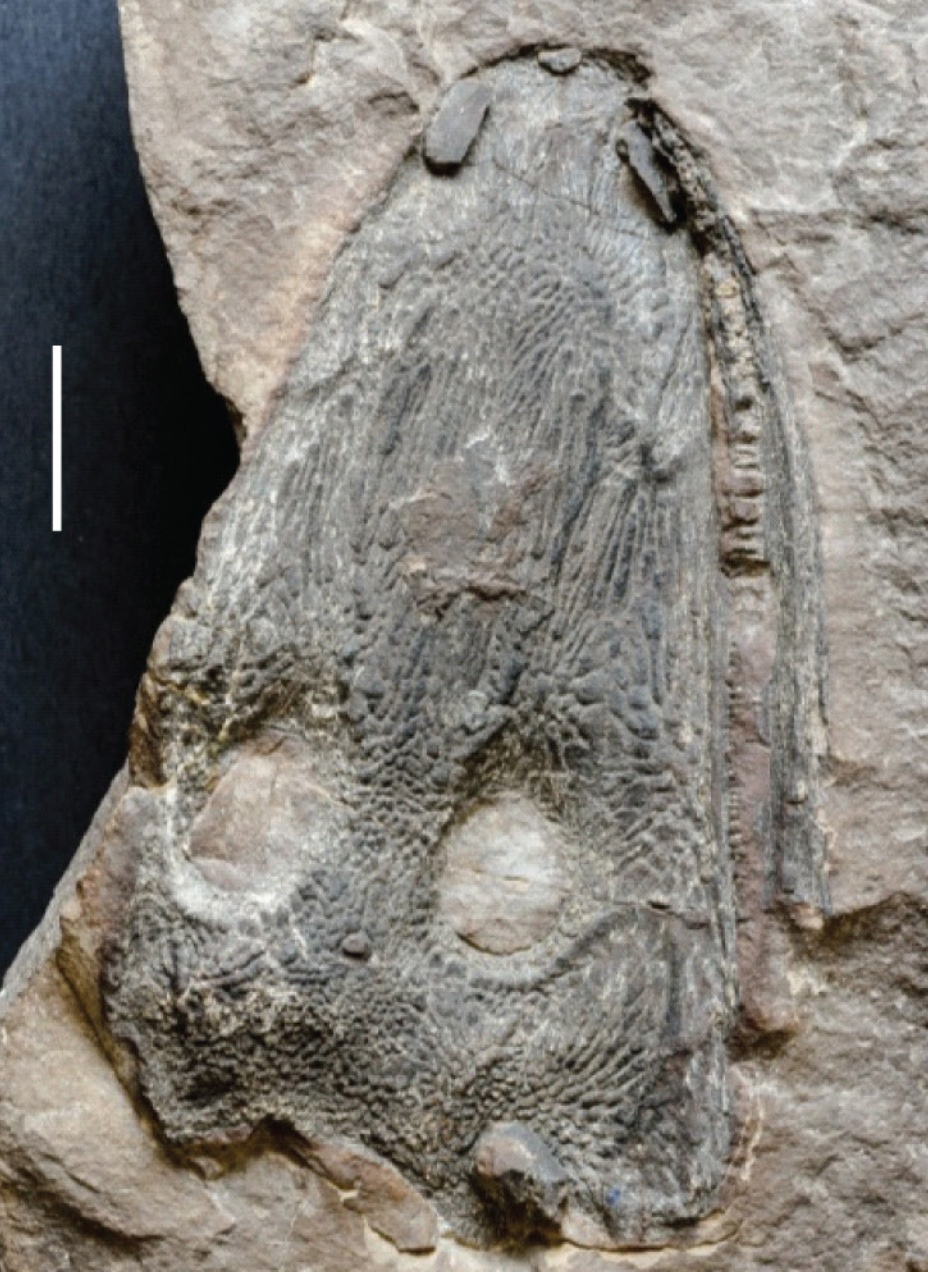
- Skull of Subcyclotosaurus
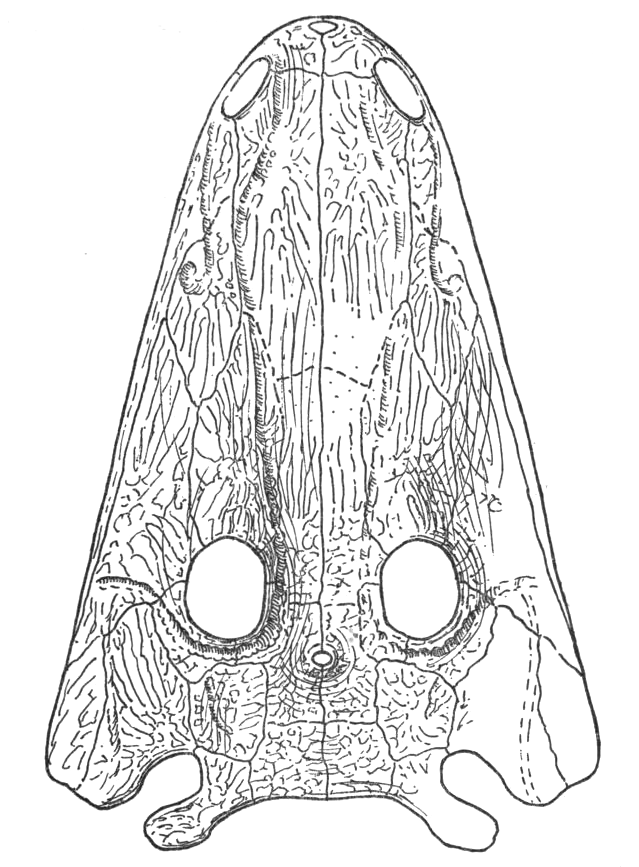
- Diagram of Subcyclotosaurus skull

Scientific classification
- Domain: Eukaryota
- Kingdom: Animalia
- Phylum: Chordata
- Order: †Temnospondyli
- Suborder: †Stereospondyli
- Clade: †Capitosauria
- Family: †Mastodonsauridae
- Genus: †Subcyclotosaurus; Watson, 1958

Type species
- †Subcyclotosaurus brookvalensis Watson, 1958

= Subcyclotosaurus =

Subcyclotosaurus Temporal range: Early Triassic Anisian

Extinct genus of temnospondyls

Subcyclotosaurus is an extinct genus of carnivorous mastodonsaurid temnospondyl. It is known from a single partial skull from the Hawkesbury Sandstone formation in Australia.

== Discovery and naming ==
The remains of the type specimen Subcyclotosaurus brookvalensis were discovered in the Hawkesbury Sandstone formation, Australia, which is in an Anisian lacustrine shale deposit. The genus and specific name was assigned by D. M. S. Watson in 1958.

== Description ==
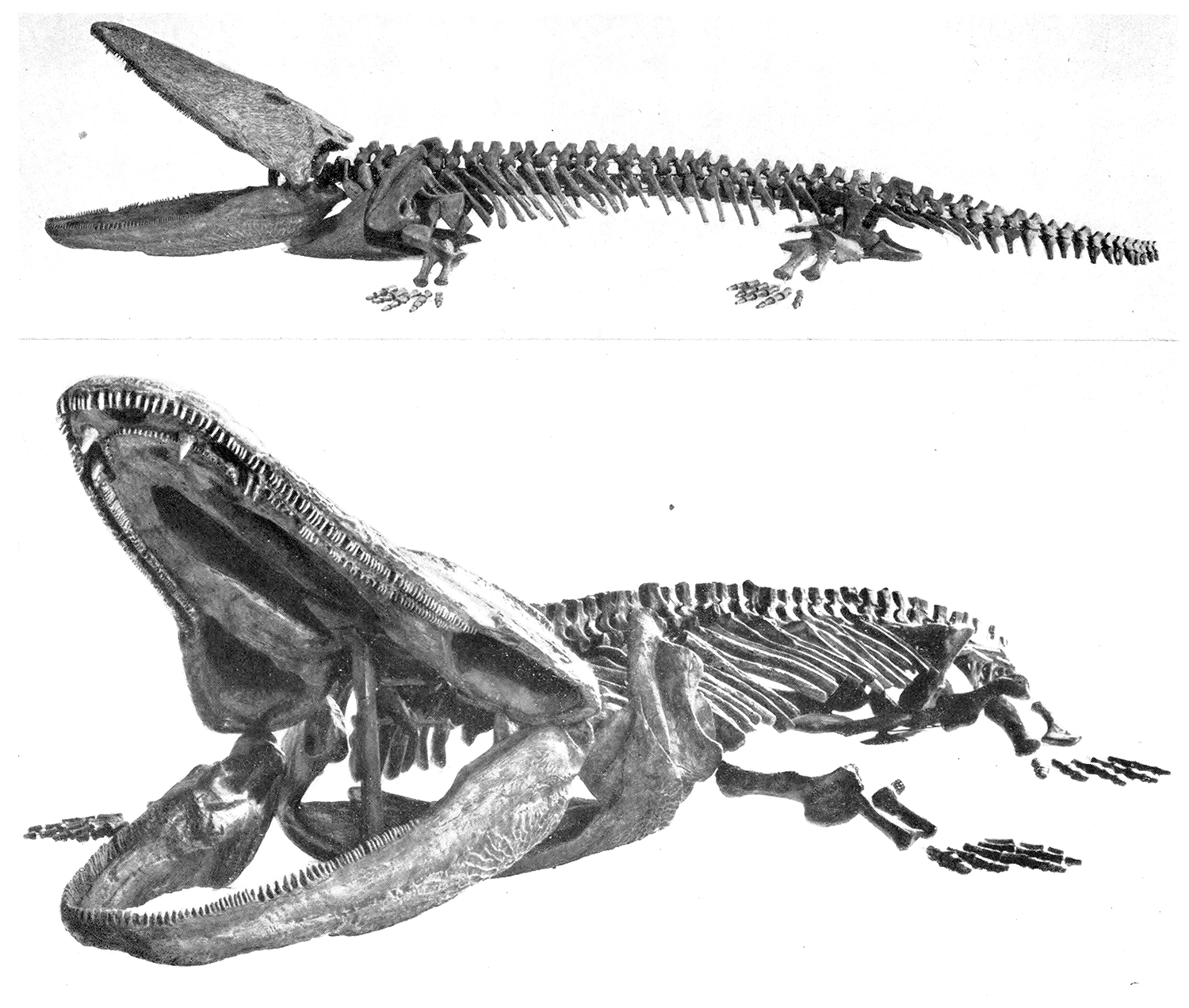
Skeletal reconstruction of related genus Paracyclotosaurus davidi

The type specimen (AM F47499) is a partial skull roof, with fragments lost on the right side. The dorsal surface of the skull resembles a small Cyclotosaur skull from the Brookvale clays of the Hawkesbury Sandstone. The specimen is from the mould of a skull broken so that the right border is lost, and is very slightly distorted by pressure so that the orbits are no longer symmetrical. The proportions of the skull resemble those of most others of Cyclotosaurus, the preorbital length being 66% of the total mid-line length. The extremes amongst Cyclotosaurus being 61% in the small Cyclotosaurus ebrachensis, and 71% in Parotosuchus helgolandicus.

The skull is characterized by the small tabular without any trace of a "horn", but with a round lappet that approaches the squamosal flange lateral to the tympanic membrane, failing to meet it by about its own width. The occiput between the otic notches is proportionately wide, a reflection of the small size of the skull. The skull is otherwise of normal Parotosuchus structure, but has a small internasal vacuity between the dorsal processes of the premaxillae. Lateral lines are often shown as continuous grooves with well-defined borders. A deep groove on the maxilla begins immediately behind and lateral to the nostril and passes straight back to the lachrymal, on which bone it turns outward and forward and ends abruptly. Another groove appears to begin on the maxilla, immediately lateral to that described above. It passes back just above the insertion of the teeth for the full length of the bone. The supraorbital groove begins abruptly on the dorsal surface of the premaxilla, immediately passes on to the nasal, and extends back on that bone close to its suture with the lachrymal. It then comes on to the prefrontal, passing on to the frontal where that bone enters the orbital border. Then as a well-defined groove it surrounds the hinder part of the orbit, turns vertically on to the jugal, and then backward to cross the point where jugal, quadratojugal and squamosal meet, continuing over the squamosal to pass back on to the body. There is a canal crossing the supratemporal.

== See also ==
- Prehistoric amphibian
- List of prehistoric amphibians
