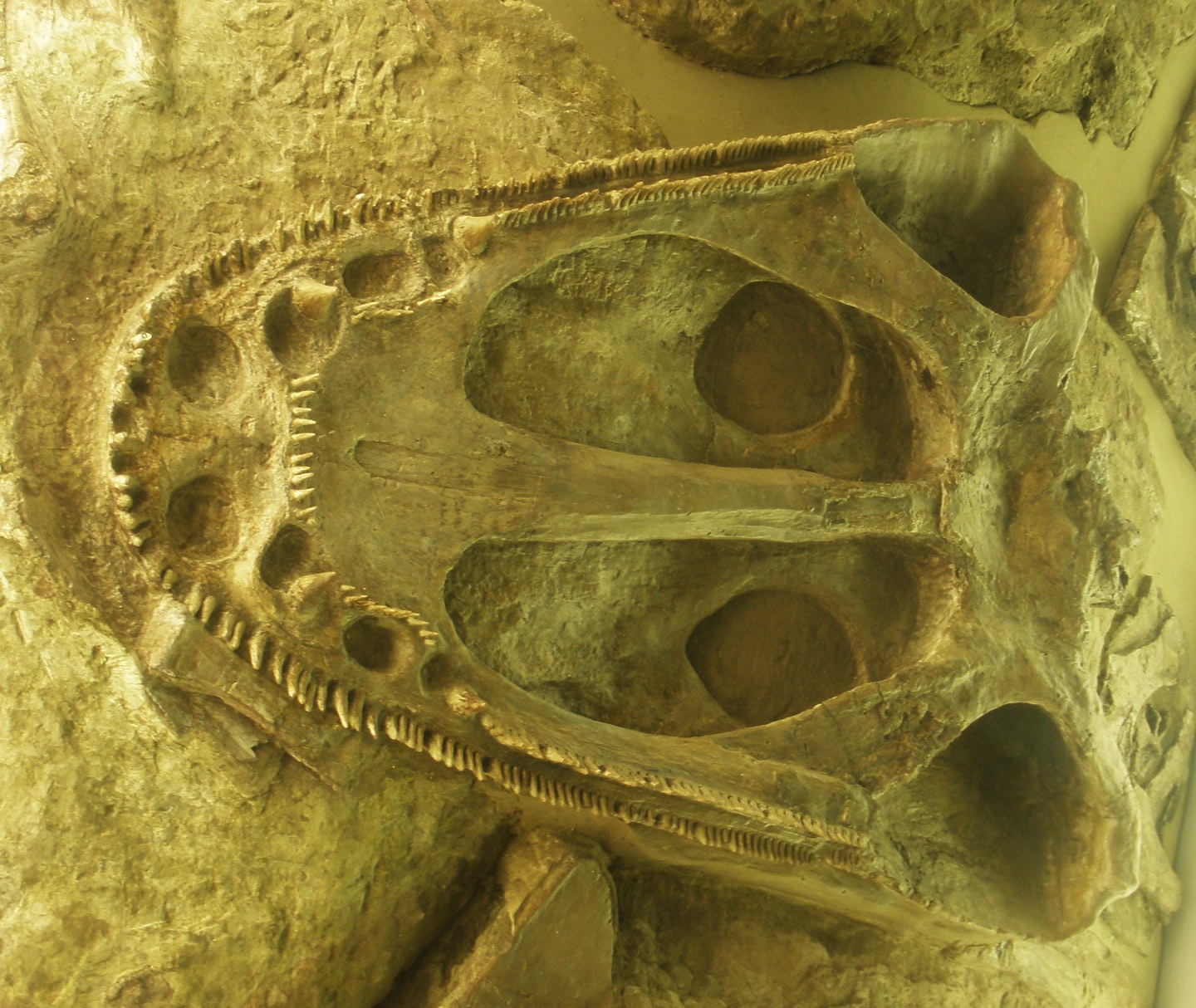
- Skull of Heptasaurus cappelensis

Scientific classification
- Kingdom: Animalia
- Phylum: Chordata
- Clade: Tetrapoda
- Order: †Temnospondyli
- Suborder: †Stereospondyli
- Clade: †Capitosauria
- Superfamily: †Mastodonsauroidea
- Family: †Mastodonsauridae; Lydekker, 1885

Genera
- †Abiadisaurus; †Bukobaja; †Capitosaurus; †Cherninia; †Cyclotosaurus; †Eryosuchus; †Heptasaurus; †Jammerbergia; †Kestrosaurus; †Kupferzellia; †Mastodonsaurus; †Paracyclotosaurus; †Parotosuchus; †Promastodonsaurus; †Rhadalognathus; †Sassenisaurus; †Selenocara; †Stanocephalosaurus; †Subcyclotosaurus; †Volgasaurus; †Volgasuchus; †Wetlugasaurus; †Xenotosuchus

Synonyms
- Capitosauridae Watson, 1919

= Mastodonsauridae =

Mastodonsaurids Temporal range: Triassic 250.0–199.6 Ma

Extinct family of temnospondyls

Mastodonsauridae is a family of capitosauroid temnospondyls. Fossils belonging to this family have been found in North America, Greenland, Europe, Asia, and Australia. The family Capitosauridae is synonymous with Mastodonsauridae.

== Description ==
=== Size ===
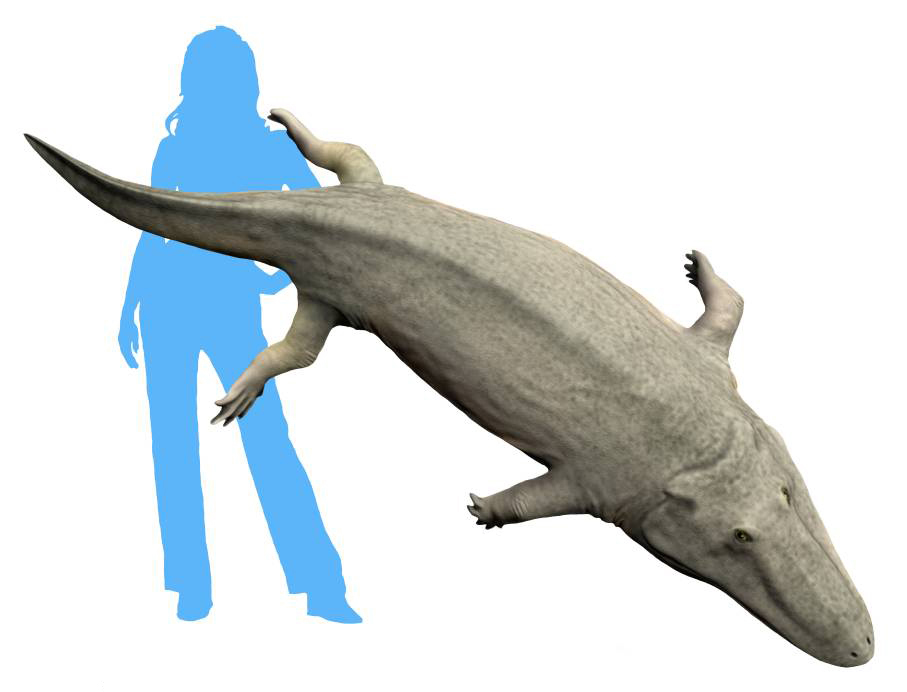
Paracyclotosaurus crookshanki compared to a human

Mastodonsaurids were generally large amphibians, with some length estimates ranging from 3 to 6 meters. Some genera, like Mastodonsaurus and Cyclotosaurus were specially large, reaching at least 4 meters or more. Other genera like Parotosuchus and Paracyclotosaurus only reached 2 meters or more in length, but it's still large compared to most modern-day amphibians.

=== Distinguishing features ===
Some mastodonsaurids including Parotosuchus were covered in a scaly skin, unlike the smooth skin of modern-day amphibians, and probably moved with an eel-like motion in the water. Another peculiar mastodonsaurid is Sclerothorax, with unusual features including its elongated neural spines. The neural spines are tallest at the front of the spine. Sclerothorax also has a very large pectoral girdle; the interclavicle bone is longer than the skull, meaning that Sclerothorax has the proportionally largest interclavicle of any temnospondyl. The body of Sclerothorax is covered by small scale-like bony ossicles that would have been embedded in the dermis in life. The skull of Sclerothorax is short, wide, and roughly rectangular in shape. The snout is wider than the cheek region. The bones along the midline of the skull roof are also very wide relative to those of other temnospondyls.

=== Skull structures ===
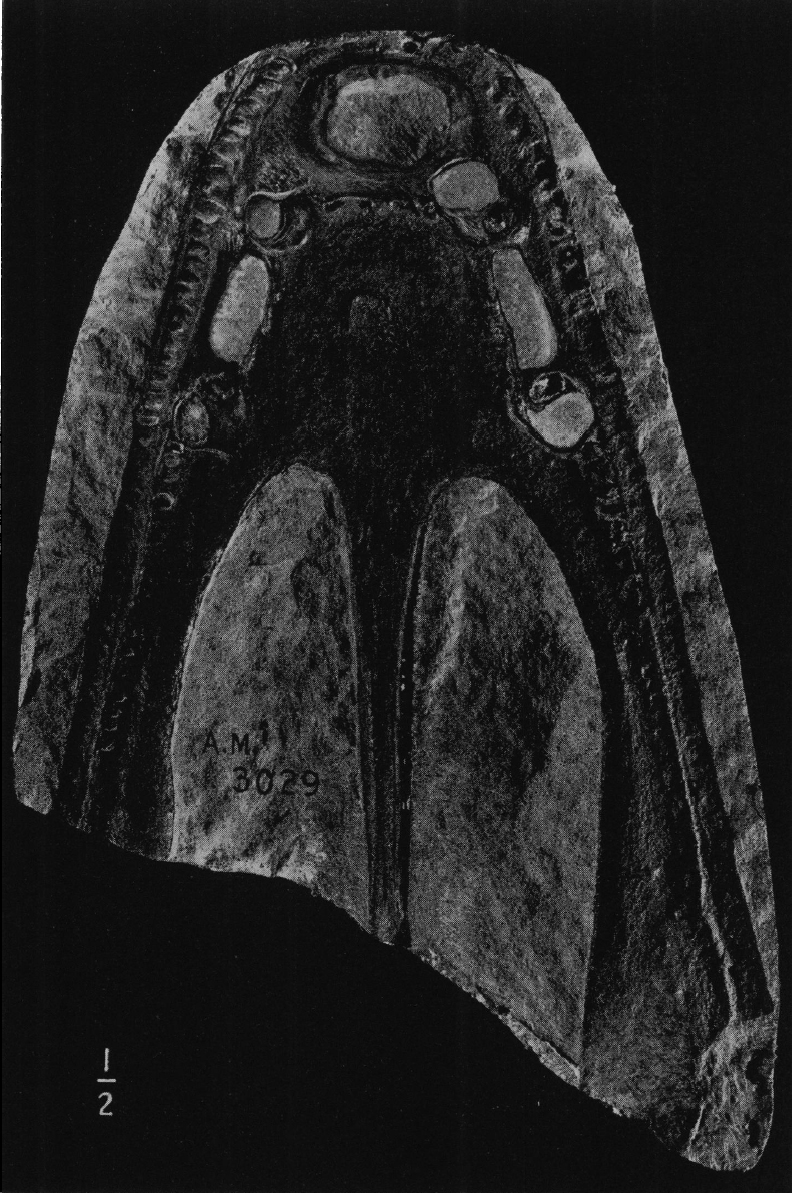
Skull cast of Stanocephalosaurus

There is a lot of known information about the skulls of mastodonsaurids, for example, Stanocephalosaurus, one of the most well-known mastodonsaurids, has a lot of data about its skull. The skull of Stanocephalosaurus has key features characteristic to other temnospondyls, with the most apparent being the flattened shape of its skull roof. The dorsal as well as ventral surfaces of the skull of Stanocephalosaurus have well ornamented honeycombed patterns throughout. Palatal views of skulls in this genus show narrow interpalatal vacuities, as well as paired palatal tusks alternately functioning on the vomer and palatine, with the vomerine tusks directed backwards. This animal shows an increased expansion of the pterygoids and palatines, as well as narrow posterior nostrils. The vomer also bears two vomerine rows: a transversal denticle row and a longitudinal denticle row that runs along the inner margin of the choana. The palatines and ectopterygoids are broader than in other temnospondyls, which is somewhat common within mastodonsaurids. Stanocephalosaurus also has a long, triangular skull which is much longer than broad, and has an elongated preorbital region continuously narrowing anteriorly to an obtuse rounded snout. This type of skull is very similar to that of Mastodonsaurus, which is also triangular in shape. The Stanocephalosaurus has at least 100 straight and conical teeth on the premaxilla and maxilla combined, gradually increasing in size towards the front.

While there is a lot of known information about Stanocephalosaurus, some of the skull regions which were previously inaccessible or too poorly preserved on Stanocephalosaurus have been observed with X-ray micro-CT scans, including the otic capsule, delta groove of the exoccipital, as well as parts of the arterial and nervous system. Air pockets around the stapes of Stanocephalosaurus have been hypothesized to act as resonance chambers, meaning that the spoon-shaped inner ear bone could be related to underwater hearing. This trait is possibly associated with early tetrapod evolution, which probably also appears on other members of this family and can act as a link to anuran tympanum evolution.

The narrow head and elongated snout of Stanocephalosaurus suggests that stress levels during biting are slightly higher than temnospondyls with a wider and shorter skull. Its skull also has an elongated preorbital region compared to other mastodonsaurids.

The vertebrae of Stanocephalosaurus are rhachitomous, with a neural arch and a bipartite centrum that is divided into a large, unpaired wedge-shaped intercentrum and smaller paired pleurocentra. In anterior and posterior views, the intercentrum is a dorsally half-ring, surrounding the persistent notochord from ventral and lateral sides. Lateral and ventral surfaces of the intercentrum are smooth, suggesting a continuation of cartilage due to the unfinished medial surface. The posterodorsal margin of the intercentrum also shows a parapophysis for articulation with the capitulum of the ribs.

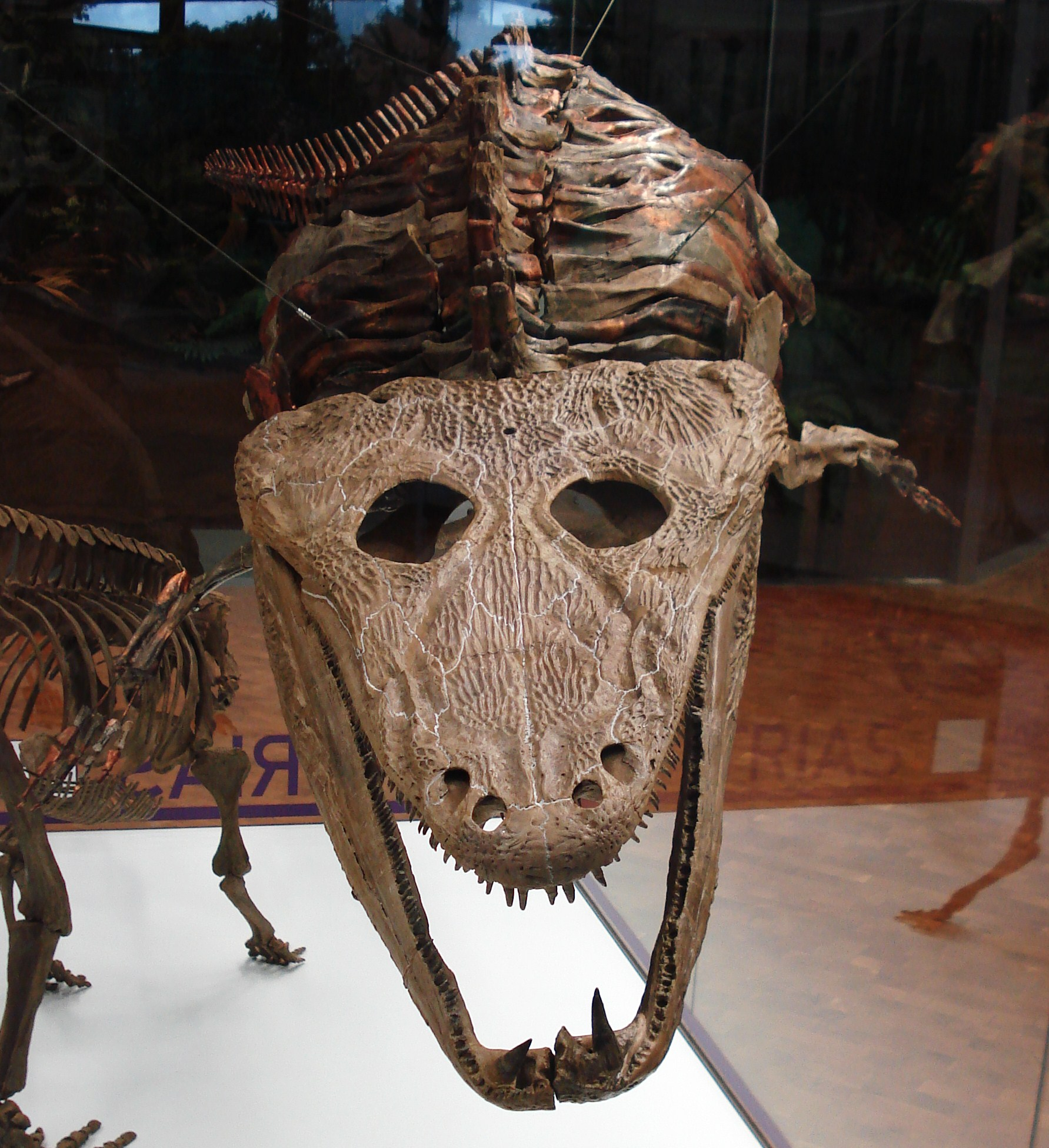
Skeleton of Mastodonsaurus, with a close up view of the skull

Another well-known mastodonsaurid in terms of fossil knowledge is Mastodonsaurus, notably from numerous skull specimens found in Germany. The large, oval eye sockets are midway along the skull. The jaws are lined with conical teeth, two large tusks project up from the end of the lower jaw, fitting through openings on the palate and emerging out from the top of the skull when the jaw is closed. Based on recent research, the body of Mastodonsaurus was more crocodile-like in shape than in earlier reconstructions, with a longer trunk section and a longer tail. The greatly reduced limb bones have joints that are poorly developed.

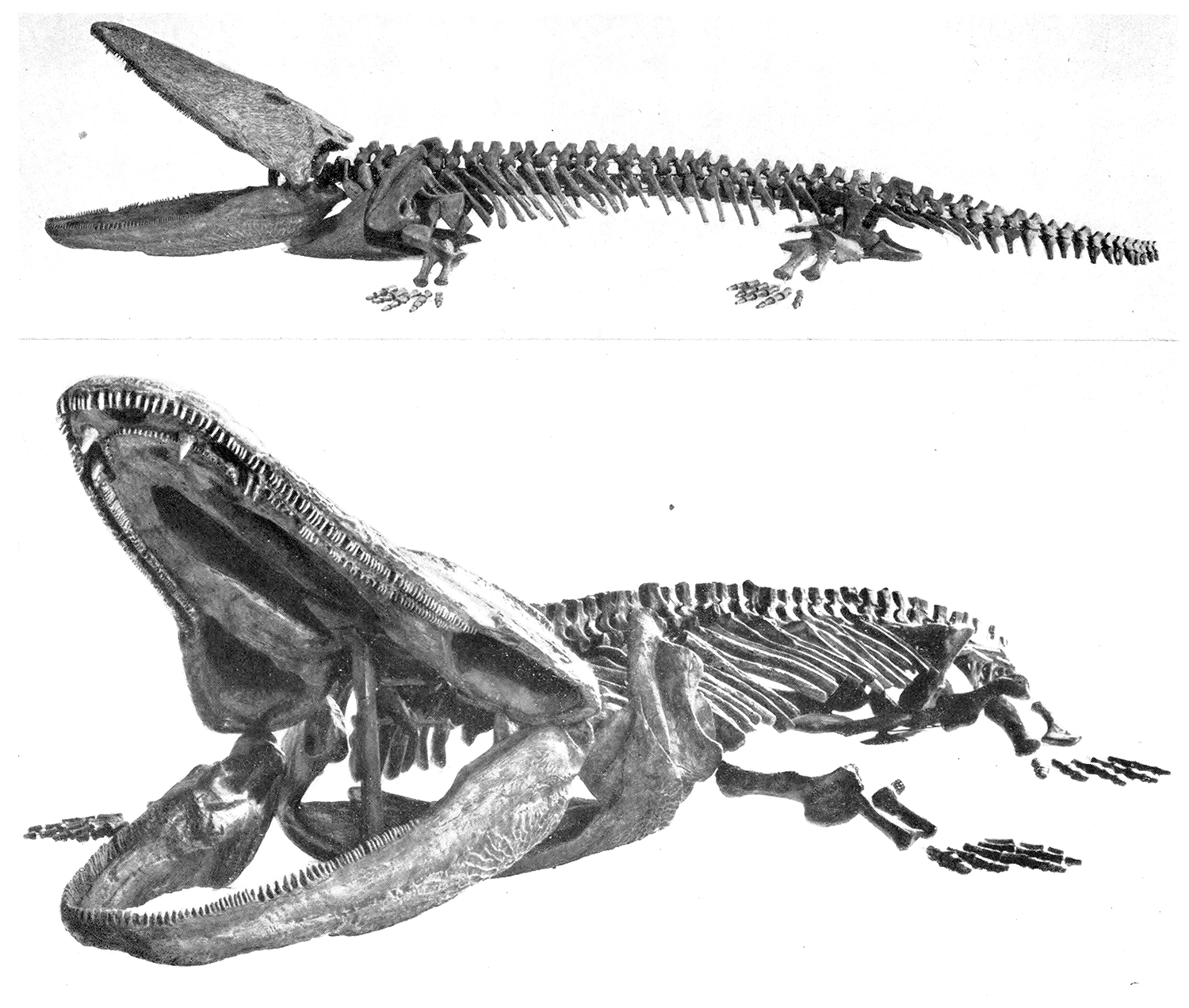
Skeletal reconstruction of Paracyclotosaurus (NHMUK PV R 6000)

Paracyclotosaurus is yet again, another well-known mastodonsaurid, and just like most genera of the family, it had various species. This mastodonsaurid has at least three species, including its type species, which is P. davidi, along with two other: P. crookshanki and P. morganorum. The completeness of the skeleton of this animal led to an accurate description. The small distortion of the head can be overlooked, and the complete preservation of the skull and jaws makes its shape certain at a length of 60 cm. The right corner of the head is essentially undistorted and shows that the skull at its point of greatest depth is almost exactly as high as the lower jaw. The lower jaw also has its symphysis the same height as the skull above it. Therefore, at its point of greatest height, the head was essentially of oval section, 22 cm high and 44 cm wide. The nostril, orbit and tympanic membrane are all directed upward, but whether the eye could be projected upward above the head to give a horizontal view similar to a frog, is difficult to determine.

With very similar features to Cyclotosaurus, Subcyclotosaurus is another good example of mastodonsaurid. Its skull is characterized by the small tabular without any trace of a "horn", but with a round lappet that approaches the squamosal flange lateral to the tympanic membrane, failing to meet it by about its own width. The occiput between the otic notches is proportionately wide, a reflection of the small size of the skull. The skull is otherwise of normal mastodonsaurid structure, being specifically more similar to Parotosuchus than to any other genera of this family. The skull also has a small internasal vacuity between the dorsal processes of the premaxillae and lateral lines are often shown as continuous grooves with well-defined borders. A deep groove on the maxilla begins immediately behind and lateral to the nostril and passes straight back to the lachrymal, on which bone it turns outward and forward and ends abruptly. Another groove appears to begin on the maxilla, immediately lateral to that described above. It passes back just above the insertion of the teeth for the full length of the bone. The supraorbital groove begins abruptly on the dorsal surface of the premaxilla, immediately passes on to the nasal, and extends back on that bone close to its suture with the lachrymal. It then comes on to the prefrontal, passing on to the frontal where that bone enters the orbital border. Then as a well-defined groove it surrounds the hinder part of the orbit, turns vertically on to the jugal, and then backward to cross the point where jugal, quadratojugal and squamosal meet, continuing over the squamosal to pass back on to the body.

Xenotosuchus skull, showing the full complement of tetrapod skull roof bones

Xenotosuchus is a member of this which is not very well known, and only a few fragments have been discovered from this animal. This genus was originally a species of Parotosuchus. Like many mastodontosaurids, it was a large animal with a large head. Its amphibian life history meant that the distinct shape of the skull roof would change from a generalized tadpole-like skull to the distinct adult shape. The head bones are covered in large pits and grooves, indicating extensive dermal armour on the head. Both the upper and lower jaw had tusks, those of the upper jaw being situated on a second row of teeth on the vomer and palatine bone. Contrary to related forms like Mastodonsaurus and Stanocephalosaurus, the tusks of the lower jaw were of moderate size and did not penetrate the premaxilla.

Like the mentioned Xenotosuchus, the genus Wetlugasaurus is also one of the smaller and less known mastodonsaurids. It had a skull that measured around 22 centimetres (8.7 in), and reached a total length of at least 1 metre (3 ft 3 in), and although it is pretty large compared to modern-day amphibians, Wetlugasaurus is still very small compared to most of the other mastodonsaurids.

== Paleobiology ==
Mastodonsaurids were piscivorous, mainly preying on small and mid-sized fish, although they also ate land-living animals, such as small archosaurs. Some evidences, including the fossils of some smaller temnospondyls bear tooth marks made by mastodonsaurid-like animals.

It is very likely that mastodonsaurids caught their food like the living giant salamander, waiting until the prey came near, then quickly opening their enormous mouths and swallowing them prey whole. The most probable food would be small fishes, up to some 15 cm. long, which swam in shoals.,

== Paleoecology ==
Mastodonsaurids were aquatic animals that rarely left water and may have been completely unable to leave the water, as large quantities of bones have been found that suggests that many species have died en masse when pools dried up during times of drought. They mostly inhabited swampy pools and fed mainly on fish, whose remains have been found in fossilized coprolites.

== See also ==
- List of prehistoric amphibians

== Sources ==
- Damiani, Ross J. (2000). "Early Triassic mastodonsaurids (Temnospondyli, Stereospondyli) from Western Australia, with remarks on mastodonsauroid palaeobiogeography". Alcheringa: An Australasian Journal of Palaeontology. 24 (4): 299–305. Bibcode:2000Alch...24..299D. doi:10.1080/03115510008619533. S2CID 140541478.
- Moser, Markus; Schoch, Rainer (2007). "Revision of the Type Material and Nomenclature of Mastodonsaurus Giganteus (Jaeger) (Temnospondyli) from the Middle Triassic of Germany". Palaeontology. 50 (5): 1245–1266. Bibcode:2007Palgy..50.1245M. doi:10.1111/j.1475-4983.2007.00705.x.
