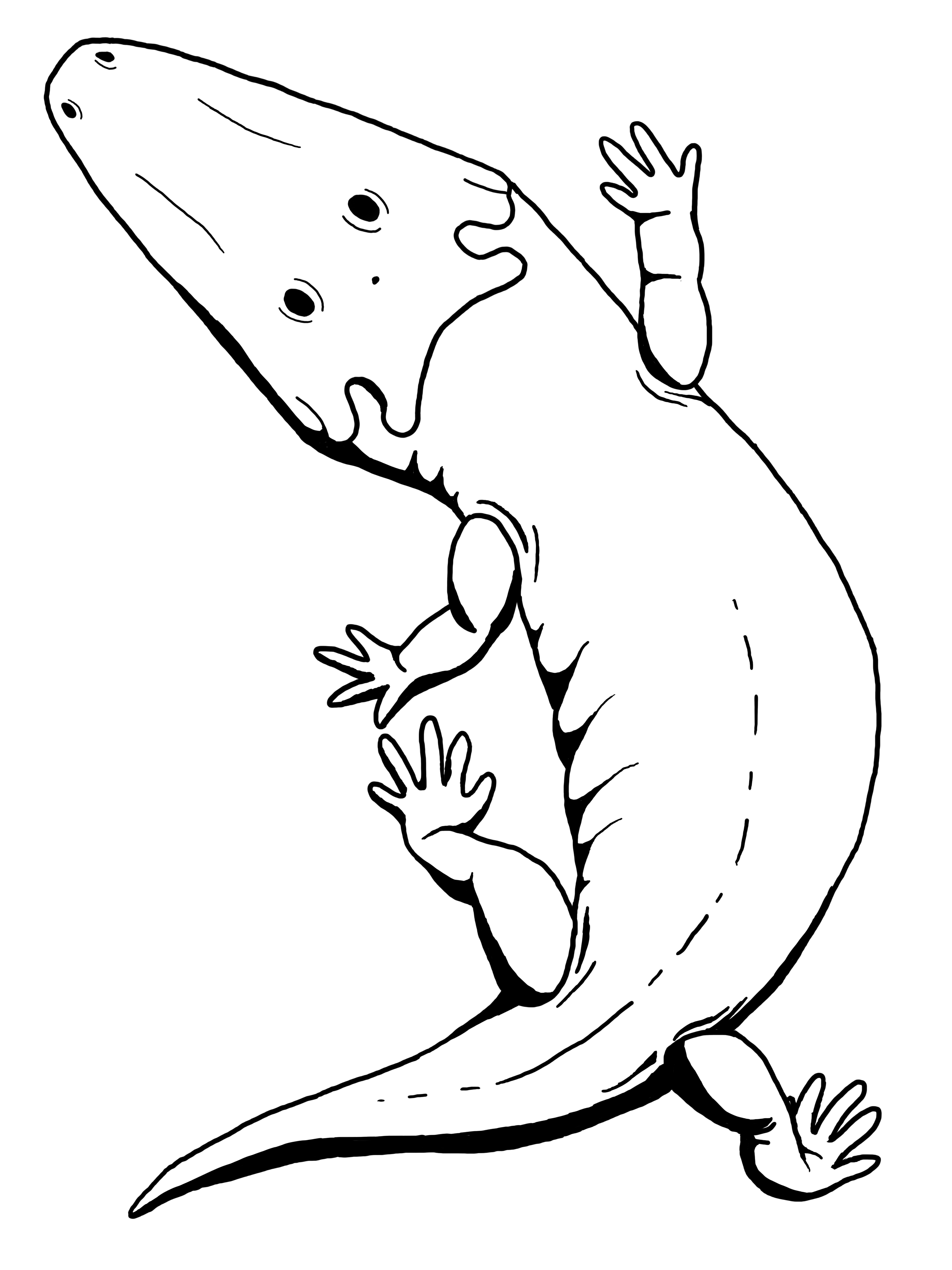

Scientific classification
- Kingdom: Animalia
- Phylum: Chordata
- Clade: Tetrapoda
- Order: †Temnospondyli
- Suborder: †Stereospondyli
- Clade: †Capitosauria
- Family: †Mastodonsauridae
- Genus: †Jammerbergia; Damiani and Hancox, 2003

Type species
- †Jammerbergia formops Damiani and Hancox, 2003

= Jammerbergia =

Jammerbergia Temporal range: Early or Middle Triassic

Extinct genus of temnospondyls

Jammerbergia is an extinct genus of mastodonsauroid temnospondyl within the family Mastodonsauridae. The only species is Jammerbergia formops, named in 2003 from the Cynognathus Assemblage Zone of South Africa.

== History of study ==
Jammerbergia was named for the holotype and only known specimen (NM QR1436), a partial posterior skull, that was collected by E.C.N. van Hoepen in 1927 from the Wepener District of the Free State Province of South Africa. Although stratigraphic information was not originally collected, the inferred stratigraphic position is based on the more confidently known position of other fossils from the Wepener District. More specifically, the holotype is inferred to be from the Trirachodon-Kannemeyeria Subzone (historically the "middle subzone" or "subzone B." As noted in an addendum in the original description, the holotype was stolen in Bloemfontein while the paper was in production and has never been recovered, so the material has never been re-examined, and the taxon is not commonly compared to in other capitosaur literature.

The genus name derives from Jammerberg, the type locality. The species name derives from Latin forma (image/likeness) and -ops (face).

== Anatomy ==
The holotype represents the posterior half of a relatively large skull, with most of the surface of the dorsal roof having been lost and some features preserved only as impressions via infilled sediment. The palate and occiput preserve more of the fossilized surface. Damiani & Hancox (2003) diagnosed the taxon by a unique combination of features, including: (1) tabulars large, antero-posteriorly expanded and laterally directed; (2) foreshortened squamosal-quadratojugal margin; (3) short quadrate ramus of the pterygoid; (4) ventral 'bulge' present on lateral margins of the body of the parasphenoid; (5) a large medial process of the quadratojugal contacts the quadrate ramus; and (6) the crista muscularis of the parasphenoid is massive. They also cite on autapomorphic feature, an occipital border situated posterior to the squamosal-quadratojugal suture.

== Phylogenetic relationships ==
Damiani & Hancox (2003) originally classified Jammerbergia as a mastodonsaurid, and due to the loss of the holotype and only specimen (and its incompleteness), it is not routinely sampled in phylogenetic analyses.
