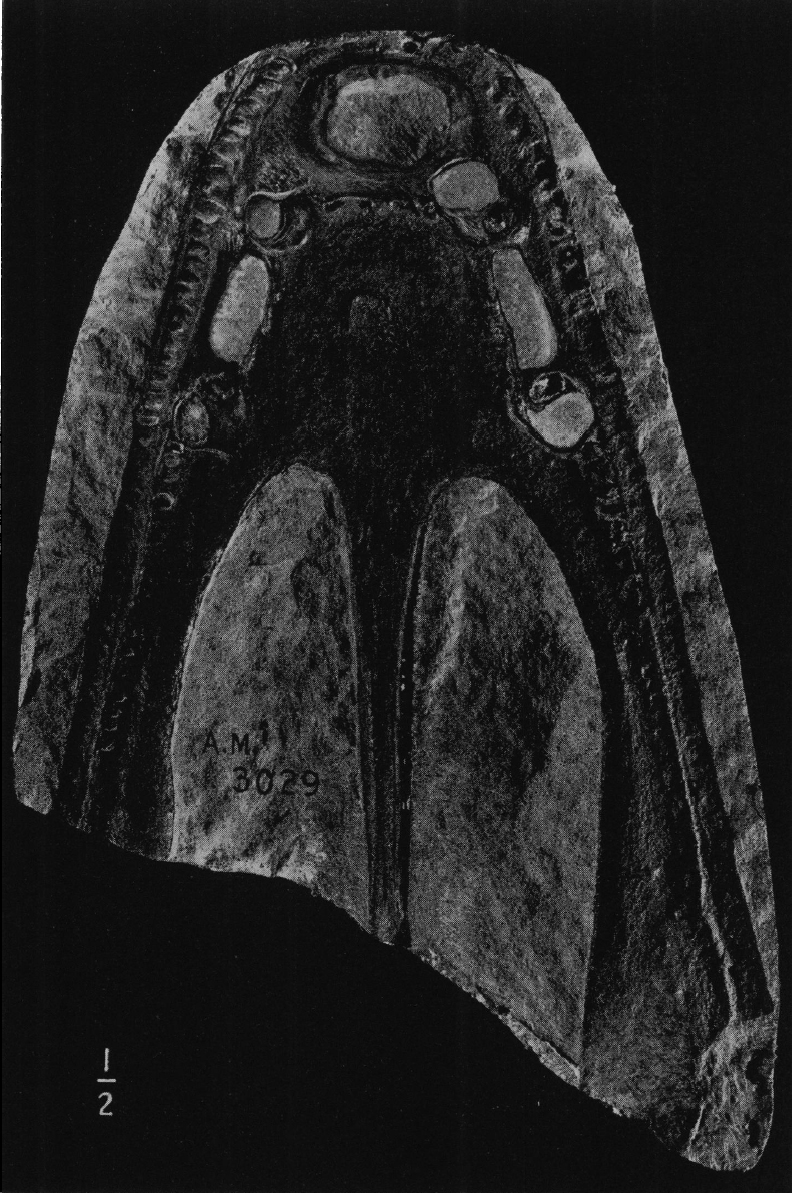
- Cast of a Stanocephalosaurus birdi palate taken from a natural impression

Scientific classification
- Kingdom: Animalia
- Phylum: Chordata
- Clade: Tetrapoda
- Order: †Temnospondyli
- Suborder: †Stereospondyli
- Clade: †Capitosauria
- Family: †Mastodonsauridae
- Genus: †Stanocephalosaurus; Brown, 1933

Species
- †S. birdi Brown, 1933(type); †S. amenasensis Dahoumane, Nedjari, Ait-Ouali, Taquet, Vacant, and Steyer, 2016; †S. pronus Howie, 1970; †S. rajareddyi Sengupta, 2003

= Stanocephalosaurus =

Stanocephalosaurus Temporal range: Anisian ~247–242 Ma

Extinct genus of temnospondyls

Stanocephalosaurus (stano from Greek stenos, meaning "narrow", cephalo from Greek kephalē, meaning "head") is an extinct genus of large-sized temnospondyls living through the early to mid Triassic. The etymology of its name most likely came from its long narrow skull when compared to other temnospondyls. Stanocephalosaurus lived an aquatic lifestyle, with some species even living in salt lakes. There are currently three recognized species and another that needs further material to establish its legitimacy. The three known species are Stanocephalosaurus pronus from the Middle Triassic in Tanzania, Stanocephalosaurus amenasensis from the Lower Triassic in Algeria, and Stanocephalosaurus birdi, from the middle Triassic in Arizona. Stanocephalosaurus rajareddyi from the Middle Triassic in central India needs further evidence in order to establish its relationship among other Stanocephalosaurs. Like other temnospondyls, Stanocephalosaurus was an aquatic carnivore. Evidence of multiple species discovered in a wide range of localities proves that Stanocephalosaurus were present all across Pangea throughout the early to mid Triassic.

== History of discovery ==
The earliest known discovery of the genus was on November 9, 1932 by Roland T. Bird while on a motorcycle trip, where he found a partial skull "six and six-tenths miles southwest of Winslow, Arizona, near the road to Pine and Payson along the edge of a small mesa with other fossil remains." There was no bone present, but the natural impression of the skull was later brought to Barnum Brown, an American paleontologist, at the American Museum of Natural History in New York City, who named the new genus and species Stanocephalosaurus birdi (Presumably honoring Bird's name). The narrow skull and slender parasphenoid, internal nairs, as well as interpalatal vacuities were key characteristics in identifying this fossil as a new genus. Barnum did not want to designate a family without a more complete skull or a more defined impression. Other species of Stanocephalosaurus have been discovered since, in a variety of regions such as India, Tanzania, and Algeria.

=== Species ===
There are currently three known species of Stanocephalosaurus. The species S. rajareddyi is assumed to belong to this genus, but the subject is still controversial.

S. birdi: The earliest discovered species of Stanocephalosaurus, found in the middle Triassic just outside of Winslow, Arizona. Like other Stanocephalosaurus, it has a narrow head, but a more obtuse snout than the S. amenasensis. Characterized by narrow posterior nares, and an increased expansion of the pterygoids and palatines.

S. amenasensis: The newest species discovered. From the Triassic of the Algerian Sahara. Diagnostic characters include subtriangular external nostrils with lateral borders, small orbits, posteriorly wide postfrontals, elongate parietals, concave posterior margin of the skull table, ovoid anterior palatal vacuities, posteriorly pointed choanae, and oval interpterygoid fenestrae. Discovery of the species in a gypsum layer suggests that it was euryhaline.

S. pronus: Known exclusively from the B9 locality west of Mkongoleko, an Anisian fluvial-lacustrine mudstone/sandstone in the Manda Beds Formation of Tanzania. It was named by A.A. Howie in 1970.

S. rajareddyi: Currently unconfirmed species. Discovered in the P-G Basin of central India. Originally Parotosuchus rajareddyi, its vertebrate fauna and constriction of its otic notch considered it to be a member of the Mastodonsauridae, with a new combination known as S. rajareddyi. Tabular and postparietal are posteriorly extended, and the postorbital is relatively smaller than the postparietal. However, because most fossils found belonging to this species are scattered fragments, better material is needed before confidently classifying S. rajareddyi as a new species.

== Description ==
=== Skull ===
The skull of the Stanocephalosaurus has key features characteristic to the temnospondyl order, with the most apparent being its flattened shape. The dorsal as well as ventral surfaces of the Stanocephalosaurus skull have well ornamented honeycombed patterns throughout. Palatal views of skulls in this genus show narrow interpalatal vacuities due to their thin skulls, as well as paired palatal tusks alternately functioning on the vomer and palatine, with the vomerine tusks directed backwards. Stanocephalosaurus shows an increased expansion of the pterygoids and palatines, as well as narrow posterior nares. The vomer also bears two vomerine rows: a transversal denticle row and a longitudinal denticle row that runs along the inner margin of the choana. The palatines and ectopterygoids are broader than other temnospondyls, barring other capitosaurids. Stanocephalosaurus has a long, triangular skull, which is much longer than broad, with an elongated preorbital region continuously narrowing anteriorly to an obtuse rounded snout, though this varies in species (S. amenasensis tend to have much narrower snouts than S. birdi). The Stanocephalosaurus have at least 100 straight and conical teeth on the premaxilla and maxilla combined, gradually increasing in size towards the front.

Other skull regions previously inaccessible or too poorly preserved on the Stanocephalosaurus have been observed with X-ray micro-CT scans, including the otic capsule, delta groove of the exoccipital, as well as parts of the arterial and nervous system. Air pockets around the stapes of Stanocephalosaurus have been hypothesized to act as resonance chambers, meaning that the spoon-shaped inner ear bone could be related to underwater hearing. This trait is possibly associated with early tetrapod evolution, and can act as a link to Anuran tympanum evolution.

Due to the cranial morphology of the Stanocephalosaurus' narrow head with an elongated preorbital region compared to other temnospondyls, stress levels during biting are slightly higher than those with a wider and shorter skull.

=== Vertebrae ===
The vertebrae of the Stanocephalosaurus are rhachitomous, with a neural arch and a bipartite centrum that is divided into a large, unpaired wedge-shaped intercentrum and smaller paired pleurocentra. In anterior and posterior views, the intercentrum is a dorsally half-ring, surrounding the persistent notochord from ventral and lateral sides. Lateral and ventral surfaces of the intercentrum are smooth, suggesting a continuation of cartilage due to the unfinished medial surface. The posterodorsal margin of the intercentrum also shows a parapophysis for articulation with the capitulum of the ribs.

== Paleobiology ==
The lifestyle of the Stanocephalosaurus has been long contended. Historically, they have been classified as either bottom dwellers, ambushers, or active predators. Histological observations of Lines of Arrested Growth (LAGs) in the bone structure of capitosaurids suggested that they lived in semi-arid environments with strong seasonal rains, forcing them to adapt to both aquatic as well as terrestrial environments. However, the discovery of S. amenasensis proves that Stanocephalosaurs lived an aquatic lifestyle due to the present dermo-sensory canals.

=== Diet and feeding ===
Not much is known about the Stanocephalosaurus diet other than that it was a carnivore like other temnospondyls. Due to evidence suggesting that they were better adapted toward life in water, it can be assumed that their diets have shifted towards eating aquatic organisms as well. Because Stanocephalosaurus had such large flat skulls, characteristic to many large temnospondyls, they most likely lifted their entire skulls in order to open their mouths rather than lowering their jaws. Due to being largely aquatic, Stanocephalosaurs might have lain in wait for prey below the surface of the water, and lifted its massive head to open its mouth wide to suck the food inside, much like modern crocodiles. Stanocephalosaurus most likely used large muscles in the neck attached to their large pectoral girdles. The small teeth present across the genus in addition to the large surface area for neck muscle attachment could suggest suction feeding through opening their mouths quickly. It is also proposed that during the dry season, when the sebkhas these species inhabit become ponds, the adults may eat larval and juvenile individuals in the pond, indicated by the lack of juvenile specimens within the gypsum layers, where bones are very well preserved.

=== Aquatic adaptations ===
Though there is little certainty in how Stanocephalosaurus breathed, paleontologists suggest that it had air pockets around the stapes, which have been hypothesized to act as resonance chambers, meaning that the inner ear bone could be related to underwater hearing. This trait is possibly associated with early tetrapod evolution. S. amenasensis show a circumorbital canal that runs along the prefrontal, postorbital and jugal, and a supraanarial canal that runs along the nasal and anterior half of the prefrontal. These dermo-sensory grooves suggest an aquatic lifestyle.

== Paleoenvironment ==
Through the discovery of several distinct species throughout the continents, it can be noted that Stanocephalosaurus were relatively widespread throughout Pangea during the Triassic. The discovery of S. amenasensis in a gypsum layer, which corresponds to the infilling of a salt lake, suggests that there was an evolution of an alluvial plain under a strong seasonal climate. These species also occupied sebkhas during these seasonal shifts, seemingly staying there even as the sebkhas drained into ponds. Not only that, the S. amenasensis, like many other temnospondyls, was euryhaline, due inhabiting various salt water bodies. The gypsum crust many of these fossils were discovered under acted as a powerful preservation tool, protecting the bones from atmospheric degradation. Such a high level of gypsum suggests a relatively extreme hypersaline paleoenvironment.

== See also ==
- Prehistoric amphibian
- List of prehistoric amphibians
