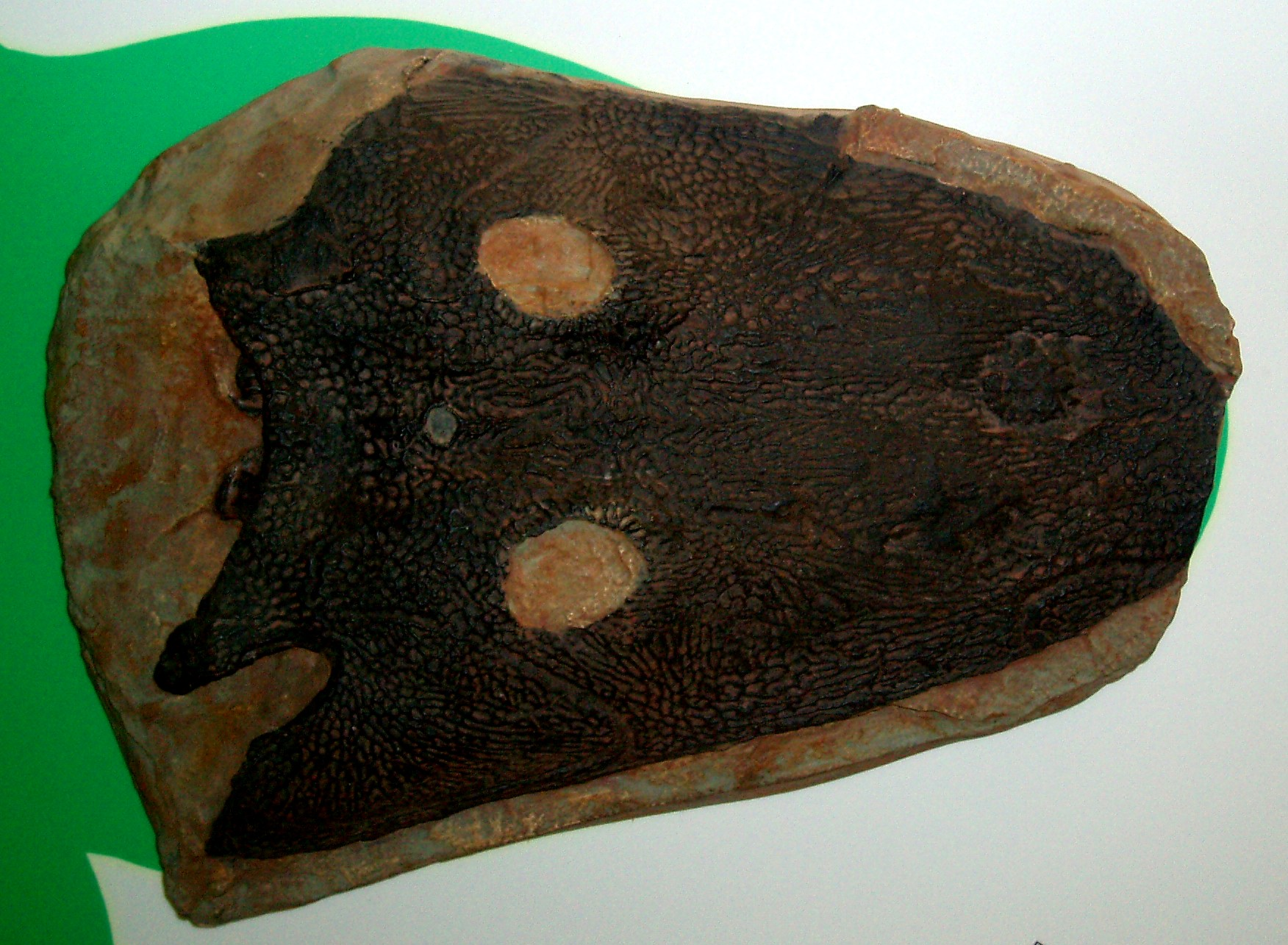
- Capitosaurus polaris skull

Scientific classification
- Kingdom: Animalia
- Phylum: Chordata
- Clade: Tetrapoda
- Order: †Temnospondyli
- Family: †Capitosauridae
- Genus: †Capitosaurus; Münster, 1836

Type species
- †Capitosaurus arenaceus Münster, 1836

= Capitosaurus =

Capitosaurus Temporal range: Upper Triassic

Genus of amphibians (fossil)

Capitosaurus is an extinct genus of temnospondyl from the Late Triassic of Germany. Its skull was 30 cm long, with a total length over 122 cm. It was one of the first temnospondyl genera to have been erected, with the type species, C. arenaceus, originally described by Münster in 1836 based on a partial skull from the earliest Upper Triassic of Bavaria, Germany. Numerous other species were referred to Capitosaurus before the 1920s, but through much of the 20th century most authors considered the original specimen of C. arenaceus to be undiagnostic, effectively invalidating the genus and leading to the referral of all species but the type to other genera. However, Rainer Schoch had suggested in his 2008 revision of the Capitosauria that C. arenaceus may be a valid taxon, likely closely related to Cyclotosaurus and Kupferzellia.

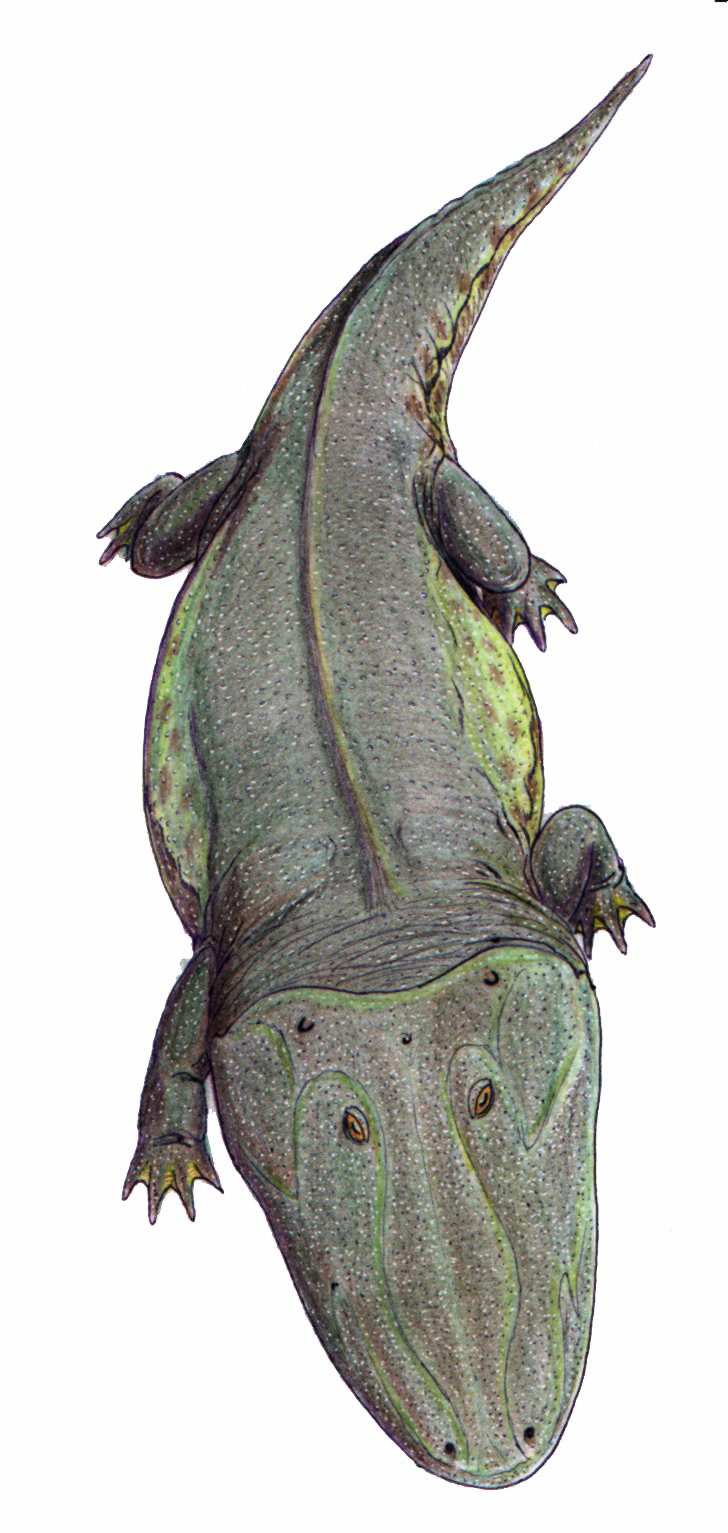
Restoration of Capitosaurus
