= Phonodus =

Phonodus Temporal range: Early Triassic

Scientific classification
- Domain: Eukaryota
- Kingdom: Animalia
- Phylum: Chordata
- Clade: †Parareptilia
- Order: †Procolophonomorpha
- Family: †Procolophonidae
- Subfamily: †Leptopleuroninae
- Genus: †Phonodus; Modesto et al., 2010

Type species
- †Phonodus dutoitorum Modesto et al., 2010

Extinct genus of reptiles

Phonodus is an extinct genus of procolophonid parareptile. It is known from a single skull found from the Early Triassic Katberg Formation in South Africa. It is the oldest known member of the subfamily Leptopleuroninae, and was likely the result of a procolophonid migration into the Karoo Basin from Laurasia after the Permo-Triassic extinction event. Because Phonodus had large maxillary teeth underneath a large antorbital buttress (a bony prominence in front of the eye), and a lack of ventral temporal emargination along the side of the skull, it probably had a durophagous diet.

== Phylogeny ==
A cladogram after Modesto et al. (2010):

- Leptopleuroninae
  - Pentaedrusaurus ordosianus
  - - Neoprocolophon asiaticus
    - Phonodus dutoitorum
    - clade "N"
      - - Sclerosaurus armatus
        - Scoloparia glyphanodon
      - - Leptopleuron lacertinum
        - - Soturnia caliodon
          - Hypsognathus fenneri
