= Elgin Reptiles =

Fossils found in deposits in and around Elgin, Scotland

Elgin Reptiles is the name given to the Permian and Triassic fossils found in the sandstone deposits in and around the town of Elgin, in Moray, Scotland. They are of historical and scientific Interest, and many of the specimens are housed in the Elgin Museum, and some in the Hunterian in Glasgow, and the National Museum of Scotland in Edinburgh. The Elgin Reptiles include the dinosauriform Saltopus elginensis, the dicynodont Gordonia, and the pareiasaur Elginia. There are also many footprints and tail-drags associated with the same Permian and Triassic sandstone deposits.

== History ==
The sandstone in the Elgin area was originally quarried for building materials. The quarries were where the first reptile fossils were found, and they have continued to yield fossils to this day. The first Elgin Reptile was discovered in 1844, but because it was only a few scales scientists of the time believed it was an Old Red Sandstone fish fossil, which were relatively well-known from sites across Northern Scotland. In 1851 a second indisputably reptilian fossil was found. Fossils of Gordonia were first found by Scottish naturalist Ramsay Heatley Traquair in 1885 and E.T. Newton described several key fossil specimens.

Elgin Museum is Scotland's oldest independent museum. The Elgin Reptiles, footprints, and older fish fossils held by the Elgin Museum are “recognised” by the Scottish Government as a Collection of National Significance due to the major part played by the Museum’s founders and associated geologists in helping answer questions about geological succession that challenged 19th century naturalists. The Museum has many original papers, including letters from Hugh Miller, and correspondence with Charles Darwin.

== Geological background ==
The land North of Elgin consists of fragments of Permian, Triassic and Jurassic bedrocks on the edge of the Moray Firth Basin, south of the Great Glen Fault. The Elgin Reptiles come from the Permian and Triassic rocks. These are called the Hopeman Sandstone Formation and the Burghead Sandstone Formation, both part of the New Red Sandstone Supergroup. Some marine reptiles have been found in a glacial erratic of Jurassic strata. Most of the sandstones are wind-blown desert dune deposits, but there are some river deposits and the later Jurassic deposits include mudstones. These rocks overly much older Devonian lake deposits from Lake Orcadie. The intervening Carboniferous sediments were eroded before the Permian deposition, leaving a 100 million year gap in the stratigraphy. This unusual sequence of rocks confused 19th century geologists for many years. The Moray Firth Basin has been exploited for offshore oil deposits. Scotland lay at about 20 degrees North in the Late Permian-Early Triassic, and was moving North. Permian, Triassic and Jurassic rocks are rare in Scotland, but some can be found along the Northern edge of the Moray Firth, and in the Inner Hebrides, particularly on the Isle of Skye. The Hopeman Sandstone Formation quarry at Clashach is designated as a SSSI (Site of Special Scientific Importance) for its fossils.

== Fossils ==
Many of the Elgin Reptile fossils contain no actual bone: they are often voids in the sandstone that used to contain bone, but are now virtually empty. This made them difficult to identify and study. In the 19th century until the late 20th century, the most common method to explore them was to infill the void, then break the surrounding rock. More recently, CT-scanning has been used to see inside the rock and reconstruct the fossils digitally. These can also be printed or cast as models to facilitate study and as museum pieces. Elgin Museum has such a cast of the dicynodont Gordonia. The reptiles of Cutties Hillock, Quarrywood and the Hopeman Sandstones are Late Permian, around 250 million years old, while most other reptile fossils are found in the early Triassic rocks of Lossiemouth, Spynie and Findrassie, and are about 220 million years old. The fossils are “recognised” by the Scottish Government as a Collection of National Significance. Many of the type and significant specimens are on display, with more fossils and archives in the collection at Elgin Museum, available for study and research.

More recent fossil discoveries from Elgin have been footprints, with over 200 found prior to 1997. These range in size from 0.5 cm to 24 cm wide, and most belong to therapsids. Numerous taildrags have also been recovered and studied, many from therapsids.

=== Archosaurs ===
Elgin Reptiles: Archosaurs
Taxa	Presence	Location	Description	Images
Ornithosuchus; O. woodwardi Newton, 1894	Triassic	Lossiemouth, Spynie, and Findrassie Scotland	A 1.2-metre-long (3.9 ft) extinct genus of pseudosuchian originally thought to be the ancestor to carnosaurian dinosaurs, but now known to be more closely related to crocodilians than to dinosaurs.	Ornithosuchus Stagonolepis Scleromochlus Erpetosuchus Saltopus
Stagonolepis; S. robertsoni Agassiz, 1844	Triassic	Lossiemouth, Spynie, and Findrassie Scotland	A quadrupedal armoured aetosaur, around 2 m long, with a very small head for its size (25 cm). It had a beak-like face that arched upwards, and is believed to have used this to uproot plants in a similar manner to a modern pig. The peg-like molar teeth would have been suitable for chewing tough vegetation.	Ornithosuchus Stagonolepis Scleromochlus Erpetosuchus Saltopus
Scleromochlus; S. taylori Woodward, 1907	Triassic	Lossiemouth, Scotland	This small cursorial archosaur (18 cm) has been identified as a member of Pterosauromorpha (a clade containing lagerpetids and pterosaurs) based on a CT scan informed analysis of its skeleton. Its phylogenetic affinity had previously been controversial for over a century. It has been positioned as either a close relative of pterosaurs, an early dinosaur or a more distantly related archosaur based on different analyses.	Ornithosuchus Stagonolepis Scleromochlus Erpetosuchus Saltopus
Erpetosuchus; E. granti Newton, 1894	Triassic	Lossiemouth, Scotland	A pseudosuchian, its phylogenetic position is debated. First described by Newton from a specimen collected near Lossiemouth, Elgin area, in the Lossiemouth Sandstone Formation (1). Further material of this taxon has been found in the Late Triassic New Haven Formation of Connecticut, USA. This makes it one of the few reptilian genera from Elgin with material known from both North America and Scotland.	Ornithosuchus Stagonolepis Scleromochlus Erpetosuchus Saltopus
Saltopus; S. elginensis Newton, 1894	Triassic	Lossiemouth, Scotland	Was thought to be Scotland's earliest dinosaur, but research by Professor M. Benton instead identified it as dinosauriform – a forerunner of the dinosaurs.	Ornithosuchus Stagonolepis Scleromochlus Erpetosuchus Saltopus

=== †Rhynchosaurs ===
Elgin Reptiles: Rhynchosaurs
Taxa	Presence	Location	Description	Images
Hyperodapedon	Triassic	Lossiemouth and Spynie, Scotland	A stocky animal around 1.3 metres long, with a beak and heavy teeth suggesting a herbivorous diet.	Hyperodapedon

=== Sphenodontids ===
Elgin Reptiles: Sphenodontids
Taxa	Presence	Location	Description	Images
Brachyrhinodon	Triassic	Lossiemouth, Scotland	It is related to the extant tuatara.	

=== †Procolophonids ===
Elgin Reptiles: Procolophonids
Taxa	Presence	Location	Description	Images
Leptopleuron; L. lacertinum Owen, 1851	Triassic	Lossiemouth and Spynie, Scotland	First described by Sir Richard Owen, it was a small, lizard-like animal (27 cm) with a long tail.	Leptopleuron

=== †Dicynodonts ===
Elgin Reptiles: Dicynodonts
Taxa	Presence	Location	Description	Images
Gordonia; G. traquairi Newton, 1893	Permian	Cutties Hillock, Scotland	An extinct therapsid. It was formerly assigned to the wastebasket taxon Dicynodon as Dicynodon traquairi. Re-study of the specimen using CT-scanning has allowed this taxon to be more formally described and it was renamed Gordonia traquairi.	Geikia
Geikia; G. elginensis Newton, 1893	Permian	Cutties Hillock, Scotland	An extinct therapsid notable for its unusual square-shaped skull.	Geikia

=== †Pareiasaurs ===
Elgin Reptiles: pareiasaurs
Taxa	Presence	Location	Description	Images
Elginia; E. mirabilis Newton, 1893	Permian	Cutties Hillock, Scotland	This animal's distinctive skull ornamentation make it instantly recognisable. It has recently been incorporated into the logo for the vertebrate fossil research and preservation group, Pal Alba.	Elginia
