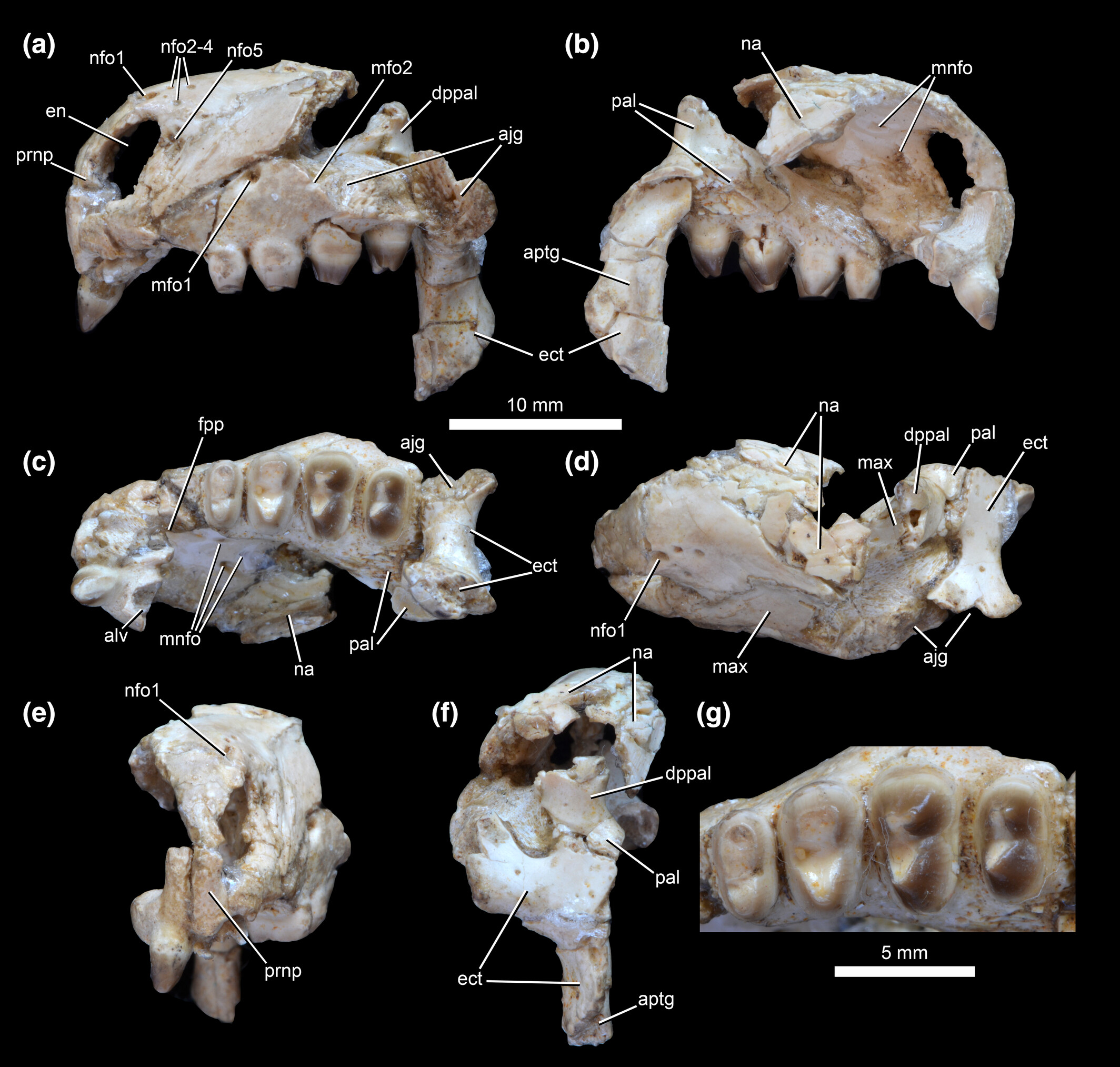
- Holotype skull as seen from multiple angles

Scientific classification
- Domain: Eukaryota
- Kingdom: Animalia
- Phylum: Chordata
- Clade: †Parareptilia
- Order: †Procolophonomorpha
- Family: †Procolophonidae
- Subfamily: †Leptopleuroninae
- Genus: †Hwiccewyrm; Butler et al., 2023

Type species
- †Hwiccewyrm trispiculum Butler et al., 2023

= Hwiccewyrm =

Hwiccewyrm Temporal range: Late Triassic, ~208–202 Ma

Fossil genus of parareptile

Hwiccewyrm (meaning "Hwicce dragon") is an extinct genus of leptopleuronine procolophonid parareptile from the Late Triassic Magnesian Conglomerate of England. The type, and currently only, species is H. trispiculum.

== Discovery and naming ==
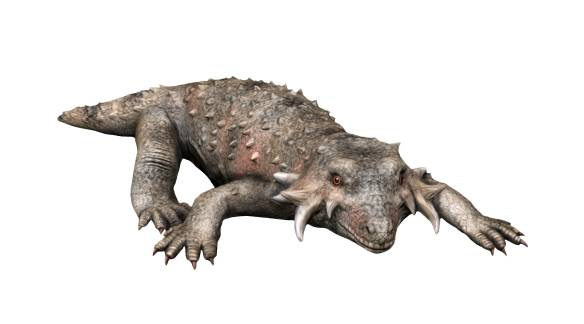
Life reconstruction of the related Hypsognathus

The holotype, specimen UMZC 2023.4.1, which is a partial skull, was discovered during the 1970s by Jeanne Evans and was likely found at Slickstones Quarry, Cromhall in an outcrop of the Magnesian Conglomerate. More specimens from the same species were later found at Slickstones Quarry, and were first described by Fraser (1988a) as belonging to an indeterminate procolophonid. The species is referred to as the 'Cromhall procolophonid' by Fraser (1988c) and as 'Procolophonid B' by Fraser (1994) and Edwards (2000).

The specimens were then referred to cf. Hypsognathus by Whiteside et al. (2016), and Butler et al. (2023) identified that the specimens belonged to a separate genus, naming it Hwiccewyrm trispiculum.

== Classification ==
Ever since its discovery, Hwiccewyrm has been classified within Procolophonidae. In 2023, it was classified into the subfamily Leptopleuroninae.

Hwiccewyrm was found to be the sister-taxon to Hypsognathus, Soturnia and Leptopleuron.
