= Libognathus =

Libognathus Temporal range: Late Triassic

Scientific classification
- Domain: Eukaryota
- Kingdom: Animalia
- Phylum: Chordata
- Clade: †Parareptilia
- Order: †Procolophonomorpha
- Family: †Procolophonidae
- Tribe: †Leptopleuronini
- Genus: †Libognathus; Small, 1997

Type species
- †Libognathus sheddi Small, 1997

Extinct genus of reptiles

Libognathus (meaning "southwest jaw" in Greek) is an extinct genus of procolophonid parareptile from the Late Triassic of Texas. The type and only species, Libognathus sheddi, was named in 1997 from the Cooper Canyon Formation in the fossil-rich Post Quarry, which is found in Garza County. Libognathus was the first definite procolophonid discovered in the southwestern United States, although another possible procolophonid called Chinleogomphius was reported from the southwest before Libognathus was named.

== Description ==
Libognathus is known from the holotype specimen including the left dentary bone and coronoid process of the lower jaw, as well as six teeth implanted in the jaw. Recently, additional material including much of the anterior skull and several mandibles were referred to the genus. Libognathus can be identified as a procolophonid by its wide molar-like teeth, each of which has a ridge running along its width and several projections or cusps around it. It is considered a member of the procolophonid subfamily Leptopleuroninae based on the presence of three spine-like processes on the quadratojugal, the deep posterior and anterior margins of the dentary, the ventral deflection of the jaw articulation of the articular bone, and more conically shaped teeth at the front of the jaw. Libognathus is distinguished from other procolophonids by the steep angle of the lower margin of the dentary (indicating a deeper lower jaw than in related procolophonids such as Hypsognathus and Leptopleuron) and a small hole or foramen on the jaw's outer surface below the fifth tooth.

Several other jaw fragments have been identified as possible North American procolophonids, and have been given names such as Chinleogomphius, Xenodiphyodon, and Gomphiosauridion. The holotype Libognathus can be distinguished from these other remains by features in its teeth; while Chinleogomphius and Xenodiphyodon have three cusps per tooth, Libognathus has only two, and while Gomphiodon has a ridge positioned centrally on the tooth surface, the ridge on each tooth of Libognathus is positioned farther forward.

Tooth replacement is evident on the inner surface of the jaw of Libognathus, where the exposed roots of teeth show smaller teeth pushing up from underneath them. This form of tooth replacement is similar to that in most other reptiles, but different from the condition in most other procolophonids, which have teeth that are fused to the bone of the jaw.

Several procolophonid specimens from the Owl Rock Member of the Chinle Formation in Arizona have been found to be closely related, and possibly referrable to, Libognathus.
