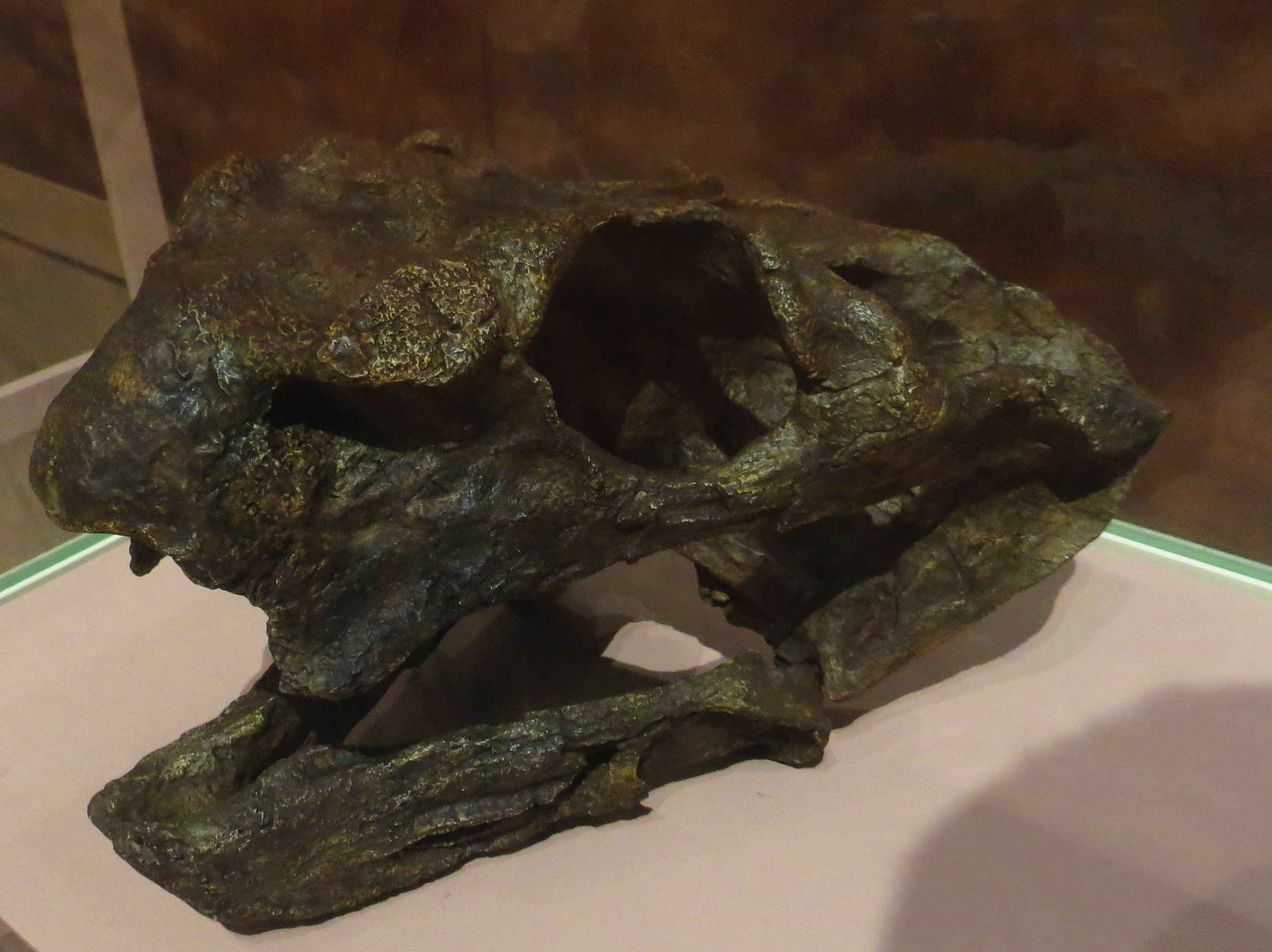
- G. locusticeps skull, showing large orbits and shortened face

Scientific classification
- Kingdom: Animalia
- Phylum: Chordata
- Clade: Synapsida
- Clade: Therapsida
- Clade: †Anomodontia
- Clade: †Dicynodontia
- Family: †Geikiidae
- Genus: †Geikia; Newton, 1893

Type species
- †G. elginensis Newton, 1893

Species
- †G. elginensis Newton, 1893 (type); †G. locusticeps von Huene, 1942 (originally Dicynodon locusticeps)

= Geikia =

Geikia Temporal range: Late Permian

Extinct genus of dicynodonts

Geikia is an extinct genus of dicynodont therapsids from the late Permian. The abundance and diversity of dicynodonts during this period, combined with incomplete or inadequately prepared specimens, have led to challenges in determining relationships within this taxon. Only two species, Geikia locusticeps and Geikia elginensis have been assigned to this genus. While this is the currently accepted classification, fossil record limitations have led to repeated debate on the genus assignments of these species.

== Discovery and naming ==
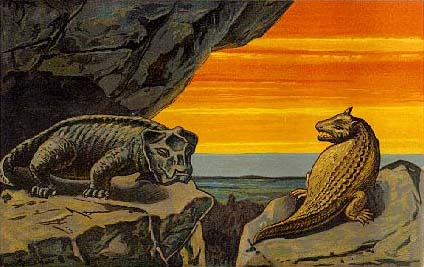
Early 20th century reconstruction of Geikia and Sclerosaurus by F. John

This genus was established in 1893 following Edwin Tulley Newton’s discovery of a new dicynodont fossil, now known as G. elginensis, one of the Elgin Reptiles found near Elgin in Scotland. Newton discovered this specimen in conjunction with other new reptiles, but believed that G. elginensis’ characteristics were sufficiently unique to justify a new genus. The holotype is the only known occurrence, and is housed at the Institute of Geological Sciences in London.

There have been two occurrences of the second species, G. locusticeps, both from the Ruhuhu Basin of Tanzania. Originally discovered by Friedrich von Huene in 1942, they are housed at the Institut und Museum für Geologie und Paläontologie der Universität Tübingen.

The name Geikia was proposed by E.T. Newton, who investigated the G. elginensis holotype in 1892. This name was a dedication to Sir Archibald Geikie, the Director-General of the Geological Survey at the time.

=== Specimens ===
The only G. elginensis specimen is a natural mold of a nearly complete skull and mandible, associated left humerus, and an isolated metapodial or proximal phalanx. The G. locusticeps holotype is a skull lacking the tip of premaxilla, right quadrate, left temporal arch, and mandible. Two occurrences of this species exist in the fossil record. Analyses of G. elginensis and G. locusticeps indicate affinities to each other, but each also shares many characteristics with other taxa, including Pelanomodon, Oudenodon, and Ptychognathus (Lystrosaurus). The absence of some expected characteristics in G. elginensis could be explained under the assumption that it is subadult and, therefore, not fully developed. However, ontogenetic changes of both Geikia and Pelanomodon, which would enable better analyses, remain uncertain.

== Description ==
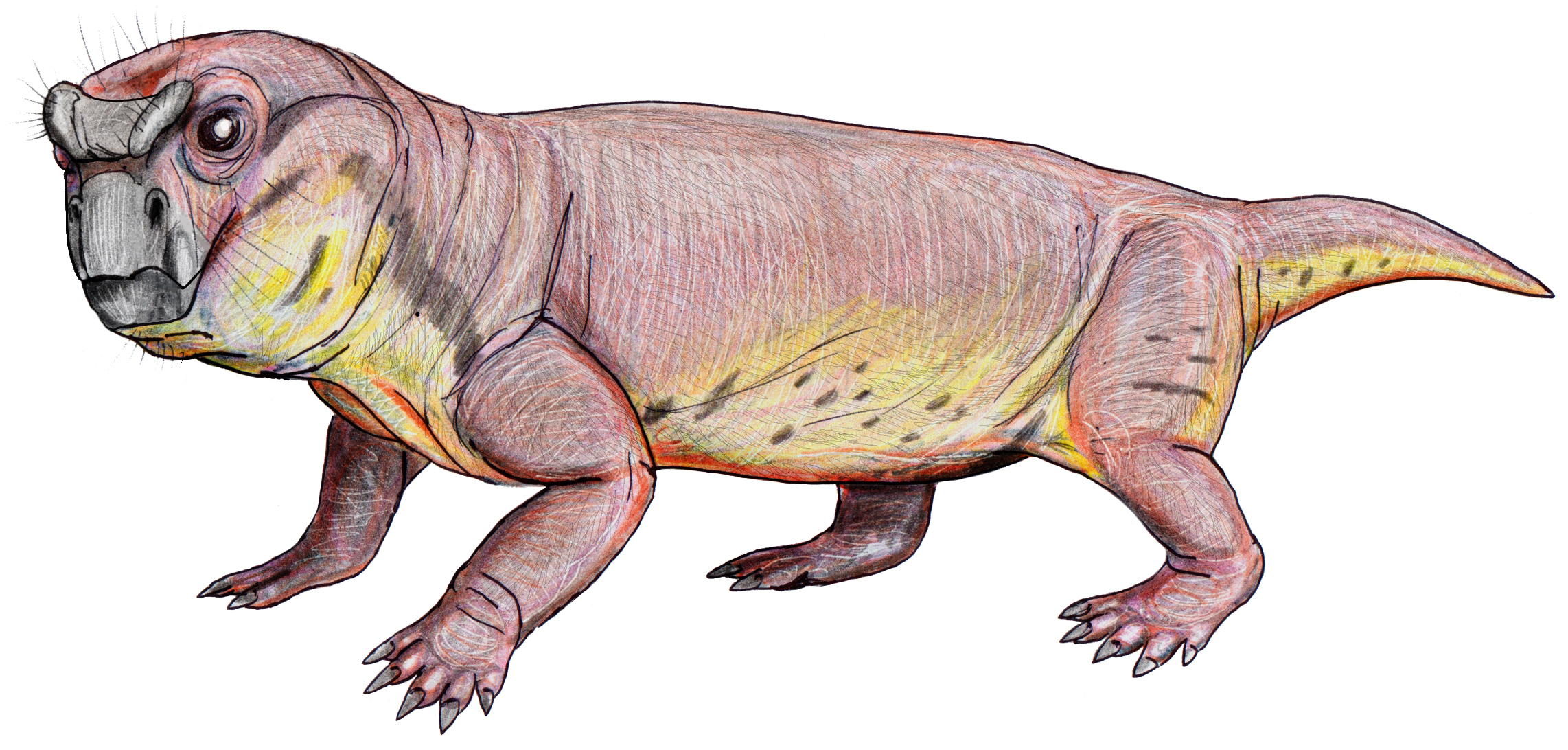
Life restoration of G. elginensis

A high level of skull specialization was significant in the classification of Geikia. Maisch and Gebauer considered the squared off anterior snout tip and reduced exposure of squamosal in occiput to be characteristics exclusively expressed in Geikia. Prior to their analysis, Rowe described the generic diagnosis of Geikia as “dicynodonts having no tusk or postcanine teeth; highly vaulted palate; anterior palatal ridges of premaxilla reduced or absent; large palatine having rugose palatal surface; palatine having extensive contact with maxilla and premaxilla; length of interpterygoidal vacuity not less than half the length of the interpterygoidal fossa; interpterygoidal vacuity lying entirely within roof of interpterygoidal fossa; well developed maxillary caniniform process having pronounced lateral ridge; sharp occlusal margin of beak; sharp ridge or “keel” developed on central edge of maxilla behind caniniform process; septomaxilla having exposure on lateral surface of snout behind external nares; anterior surface of premaxilla flat, oriented vertically, and meeting lateral surface of premaxilla in abrupt “corner”; single, prominent preorbital protuberance".

== Classification ==
G. locusticeps was recognized as Dicynodon locusticeps until Timothy Rowe referred it to Geikia in 1980. It has been suggested that G. locusticeps may be a juvenile Pelanomodon tuberosus, and the two have been used synonymously. In 2005, it was proposed that P. tuberosus be referred to G. locusticeps as a junior subjunctive synonym.

Both belonging to the family Geikiidae, the genera Pelanomodon and Geikia are closely related. Morphological differences between G. elginensis and G. locusticeps, as well as individual similarities to other species (especially those within Pelanomodon) have been utilized in debates regarding their classifications. This exemplifies unresolved aspects of dicynodont taxonomy; it has even been suggested that single or incomplete dicynodont specimens should be considered incertae sedis until conclusions can be better ascertained through additional specimens or better preparation. More recent literature attributes the cross-genus similarities between Pelanomodon and Geikia to plesiomorphic geikiid traits. With these considerations, it is currently maintained that the generic distinction of Geikia is warranted.

== Paleobiology ==
Compared to other dicynodonts, the shortened skull could be indicative of specific herbivory habits, such as biting off small pieces of vegetation. Pertaining to mastication, crushing action was likely more emphasized than slicing, due to structural limitations of lower jaw movement. Additionally, these limitations could have conferred a "selective browser" role upon Geikia. Aside from jaw specialization, the forward position and large size of the orbits could suggest a degree of stereoscopic vision. Rotational ability of the eyes could have enabled Geikia to see in a variety of directions, such as through notches in the frontals. Cruickshank indicated that these characteristics, along with the loss of tusks, could be suggestive of nocturnal behaviors.

== Paleoecology ==
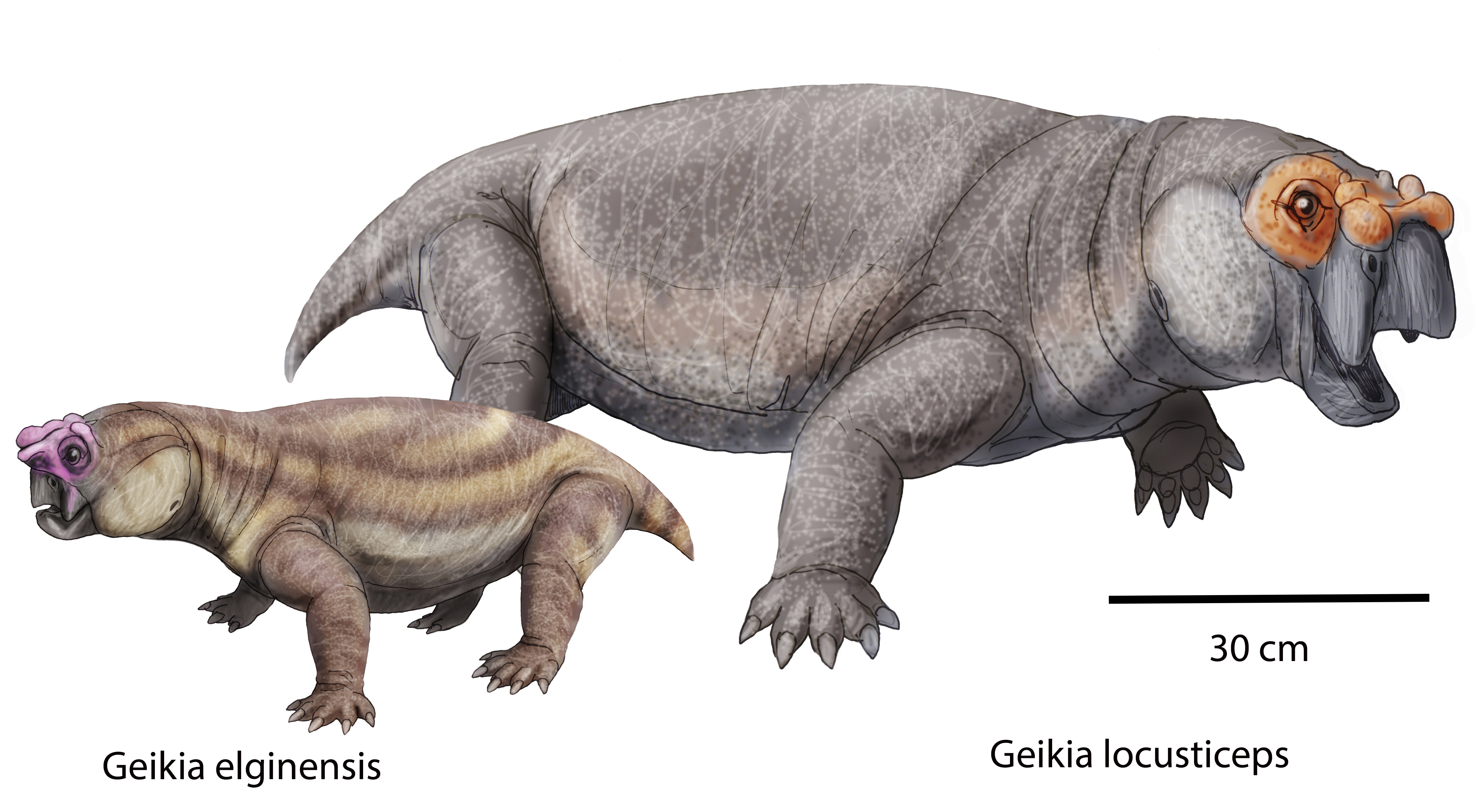
Restorations of the two species

G. elginensis was discovered in the Cutties Hillock Sandstone Formation in Scotland. The coarse, hard sand presented difficulty in the development of the specimen, which was recovered from a pebbly layer near the base of the formation. The pebbles are characteristic of water deposition, suggesting a fluvial environment. Analyses have suggested that this formation is of Permian age, specifically Late Tatarian. Assuming accuracy of age assessment, this could be representative of offshore Zechstein Sea deposits.

Also estimated to be of Tatarian age, G. locusticeps was discovered in the Usili Formation (formerly Kawinga Formation) of Kingori in southwest Tanzania. The environment was identified as being terrestrial. In a 2010 publication, Sidor et al. concluded that subsidence events during this time conferred a transition from alluvial fans to an axial braided channel, ultimately equilibrating as an alluvial plain with rivers and lakes.
