= S. armatus =

S. armatus may refer to:

- Sclerosaurus armatus, an extinct reptile species
- Spermophilus armatus, the Uinta ground squirrel, a mammal species native of the northern Rocky Mountains
- Stegosaurus armatus, a dinosaur species
