= Huangfuchuansuchus =

Huangfuchuansuchus Temporal range: Early Triassic, Olenekian

Scientific classification
- Kingdom: Animalia
- Phylum: Chordata
- Clade: Tetrapoda
- Order: †Temnospondyli
- Suborder: †Stereospondyli
- Clade: †Capitosauria
- Genus: †Huangfuchuansuchus; Chen & Liu, 2025
- Species: †H. haojiamaoensis

Binomial name
- †Huangfuchuansuchus haojiamaoensis Chen & Liu, 2025

Extinct temnospondyl genus

External image
- Holotype skull in lateral (a, b), medial (c), and occipital (d, e) views

Huangfuchuansuchus is an extinct genus of capitosaur temnospondyls known from the Early Triassic (Olenekian age) Heshanggou Formation of China. The genus contains a single species, Huangfuchuansuchus haojiamaoensis, known from a partial skull and mandible. The snout is shallow and flat, while the orbital region is more elevated.

== Discovery and naming ==
Remains of temnospondyls are common in the northern parts of China, having been reported from the area at least since 2008. However very few of the collected specimens are complete enough to assign to any particular genus. However, in 2019, a relatively complete skull with an associated mandible was discovered in the Jungar Banner of Nei Mongol, China. The stratum where it was found corresponds to the Heshanggou Formation, which dates to the Olenekian stage of the Early Triassic period. The specimen was excavated and stored at the Chinese Academy of Sciences and was given the specimen number IVPP V 31928.

In 2025 Jian-Ye Chen and Jun Liu described IVPP V 31928 as the holotype of the new genus and species Huangfuchuansuchus haojiamaoensis. The genus name is given after the name of a nearby river (Huangfuchuan) and the latinized Greek word "suchus", meaning "crocodile". The species epithet is given after a village (Haojiamao) near where the fossil was found.

== Description ==
The holotype and only specimen of Huangfuchuansuchus consists of a partially complete skull, including the tip of the snout and most of the left side of the skull. The left mandible was also found in association with the skull. The authors of its description estimated that in life, the skull would have been about 25 cm (9.8 in) long and 26 cm (10 in) wide, making the skull slightly wider than it is long. These proportions would have been similar to Yuanansuchus, which was a closely related temnospondyl that is known from more complete skull remains.

The size of the skull and level of ossification of the braincase suggest that the animal was an adult when it died and was fossilized. However, there are some features of the quadrate indicate that it may have been a relatively immature adult. Huangfuchuansuchus is distinguished from other, related taxa by the following autapomorphies: a smooth concave margin on the underside of the palatal bone, v-shaped rows of teeth on the vomers, a shallow notch on the side of the skull behind the orbit, and several features of the pterygoid and parasphenoid bones.

== Classification ==
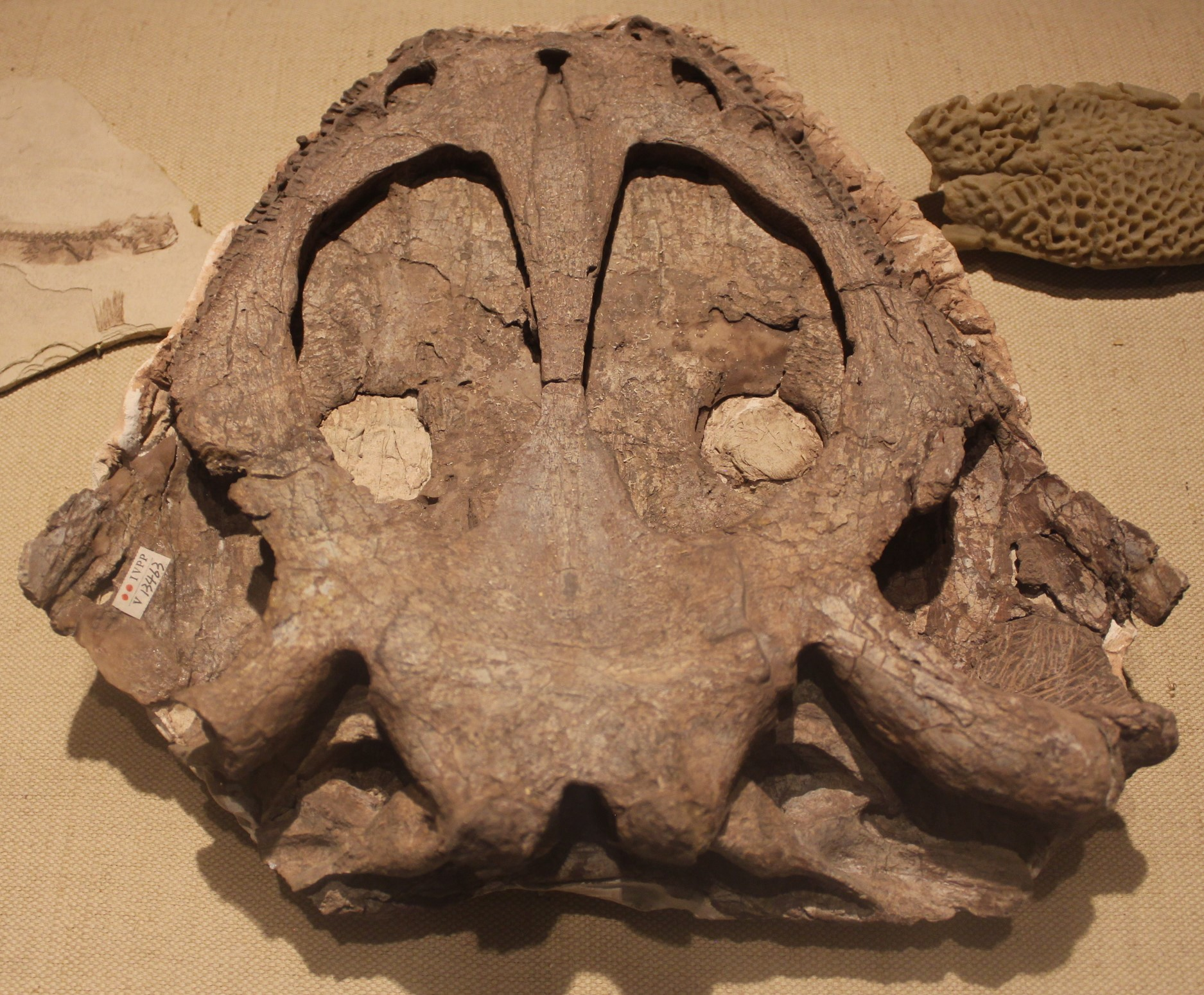
The skull of Yuanansuchus, which was likely similar in proportions to that of Huangfuchansuchus

Huangfuchuansuchus exhibits several features that are common to the groups Trematosauroidea and Benthosuchidae. These include the v-shaped rows of vomerine teeth. However, in the phylogenetic analysis conducted in their description, Chen and Liu found it to be the most basally-branching member of Capitosauria. The closely related taxon Yuanansuchus has a very similarly shaped skull, but Huangfuchuansuchus is clearly distinguished by the more posteriorly portioned orbits and long point of contect of the vomers. An abbreviated version of the cladogram presented by Chen and Liu is shown below.

- Capitosauria
  - Huangfuchansuchus
  - - Edingerella
    - - Watsonisuchus
      - Mastodonsauroidea

== Paleoecology ==
The only fossils of Huangfuchuansuchus were found in the Heshanggou Formation, which preserves a diverse fossil vertebrate assemblage. Other vertebrates known from this formation include the dicynodont Shaanbeikannemeyeria, the therocephalian Hazhenia, the erythrosuchid Fugusuchus, the poposauroid Xilousuchus, and the procolophonids Eumetabolodon and Pentaedrusaurus.

== See also ==
- 2025 in paleontology
