= Lossiemouth Sandstone =

Geological formation in Moray, Scotland

- Stratigraphic range: Carnian–Rhaetian; ~237–201.3 Ma
- Type: Geological formation
- Unit of: New Red Sandstone Supergroup
- Underlies: Stotfield Cherty Rock Formation
- Overlies: Burghead Sandstone Formation or unconformably on Devonian beds
- Thickness: up to 30 m (98 ft)

Lithology
- Primary: Sandstone

Location
- Coordinates: 57.7°N 3.3°W
- Approximate paleocoordinates: 34.0°N 0.9°W
- Region: Moray Firth
- Country: Scotland

Type section
- Named for: Lossiemouth
- Lossiemouth Sandstone (the United Kingdom) Lossiemouth Sandstone (Scotland)

The Lossiemouth Sandstone is a Middle to Late Triassic (Ladinian to Norian) age geological formation. It is exposed on the south side of the Moray Firth near Lossiemouth and near Golspie in Sutherland. Dinosaur remains are among the fossils that have been recovered from the formation.

== Fossil content ==
Vertebrates reported from the Lossiemouth Sandstone
Genus	Species	Location	Stratigraphic position	Material	Notes	Images
Dasygnathoides	D. longidens				Nomen dubium	
Brachyrhinodon	B. taylori				A rhynchocephalian	
Erpetosuchus	E. granti				A Pseudosuchian	
Hyperodapedon	H. gordoni				A rhynchosaur	
Leptopleuron	L. lacertinum				A procolophonid	
Ornithosuchus	O. woodwardi				An ornithosuchid	
Ornithosuchus	O. taylori				Junior synonym of O. woodwardi	
Saltopus	S. elginensis			"Partial postcranial skeleton"	A dinosauriform previously classified as a specimen of Leptopleuron	
Scleromochlus	S. taylori				A possible avemetatarsalian	
Stagonolepis	S. robertsoni				An aetosaur	
Telerpeton	T. elginense				Junior synonym of Leptopleuron	

== See also ==
- List of dinosaur-bearing rock formations
  - List of stratigraphic units with indeterminate dinosaur fossils
- List of fossiliferous stratigraphic units in Scotland
- Ischigualasto Formation, contemporaneous fossiliferous formation of the Ischigualasto-Villa Unión Basin, Argentina
- Candelária Formation, contemporaneous fossiliferous formation of the Paraná Basin in southeastern Brazil
- Molteno Formation, contemporaneous fossiliferous formation of the Karoo Basin in southern Africa
- Fremouw Formation, contemporaneous fossiliferous formation of Antarctica
