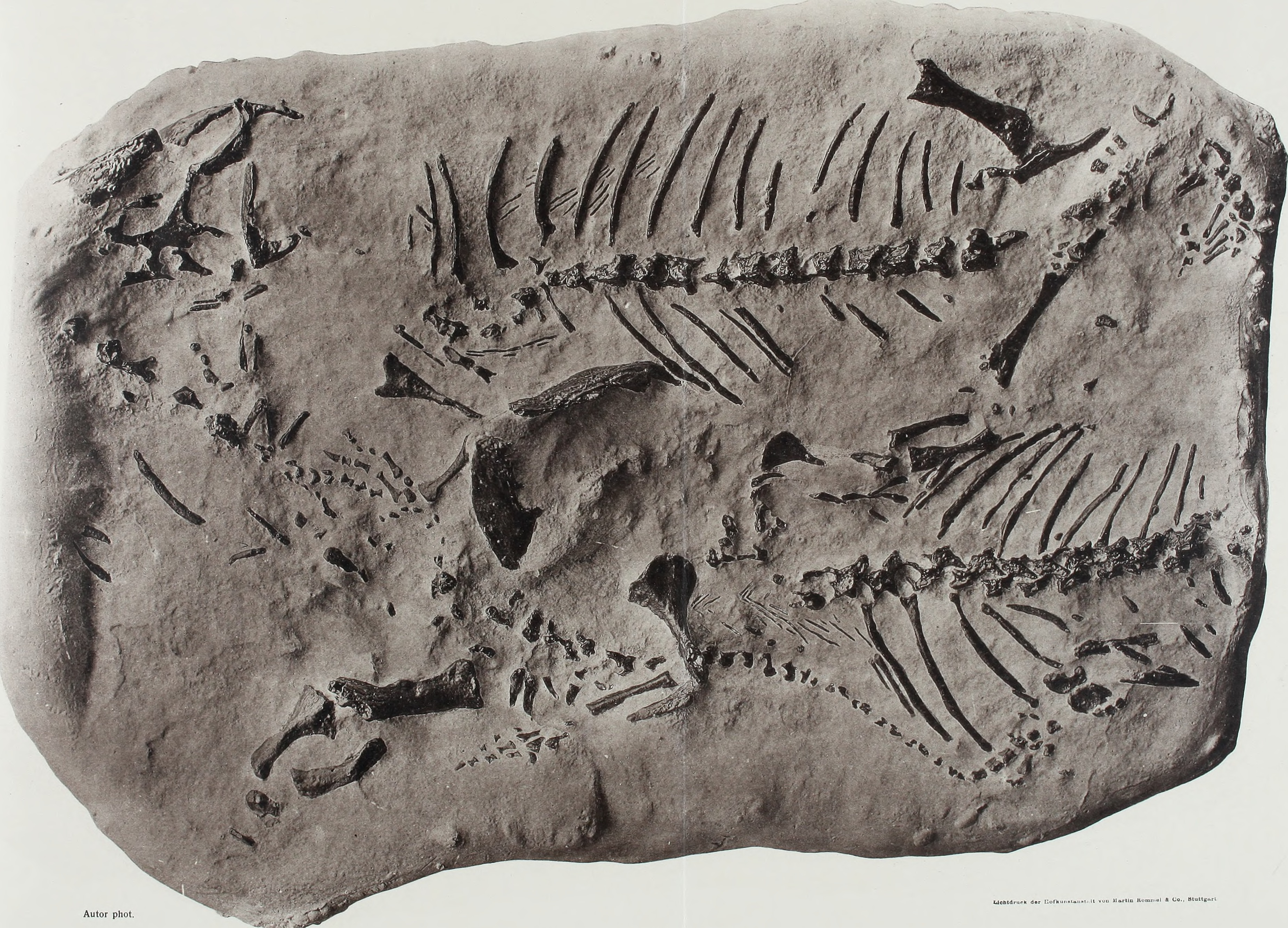
- Fossil

Scientific classification
- Domain: Eukaryota
- Kingdom: Animalia
- Phylum: Chordata
- Clade: †Parareptilia
- Order: †Procolophonomorpha
- Family: †Procolophonidae
- Subfamily: †Leptopleuroninae
- Genus: †Koiloskiosaurus; Von Huene, 1911

Type species
- †Koiloskiosaurus coburgensis Von Huene, 1911

= Koiloskiosaurus =

Koiloskiosaurus Temporal range: Early Triassic

Extinct genus of reptiles

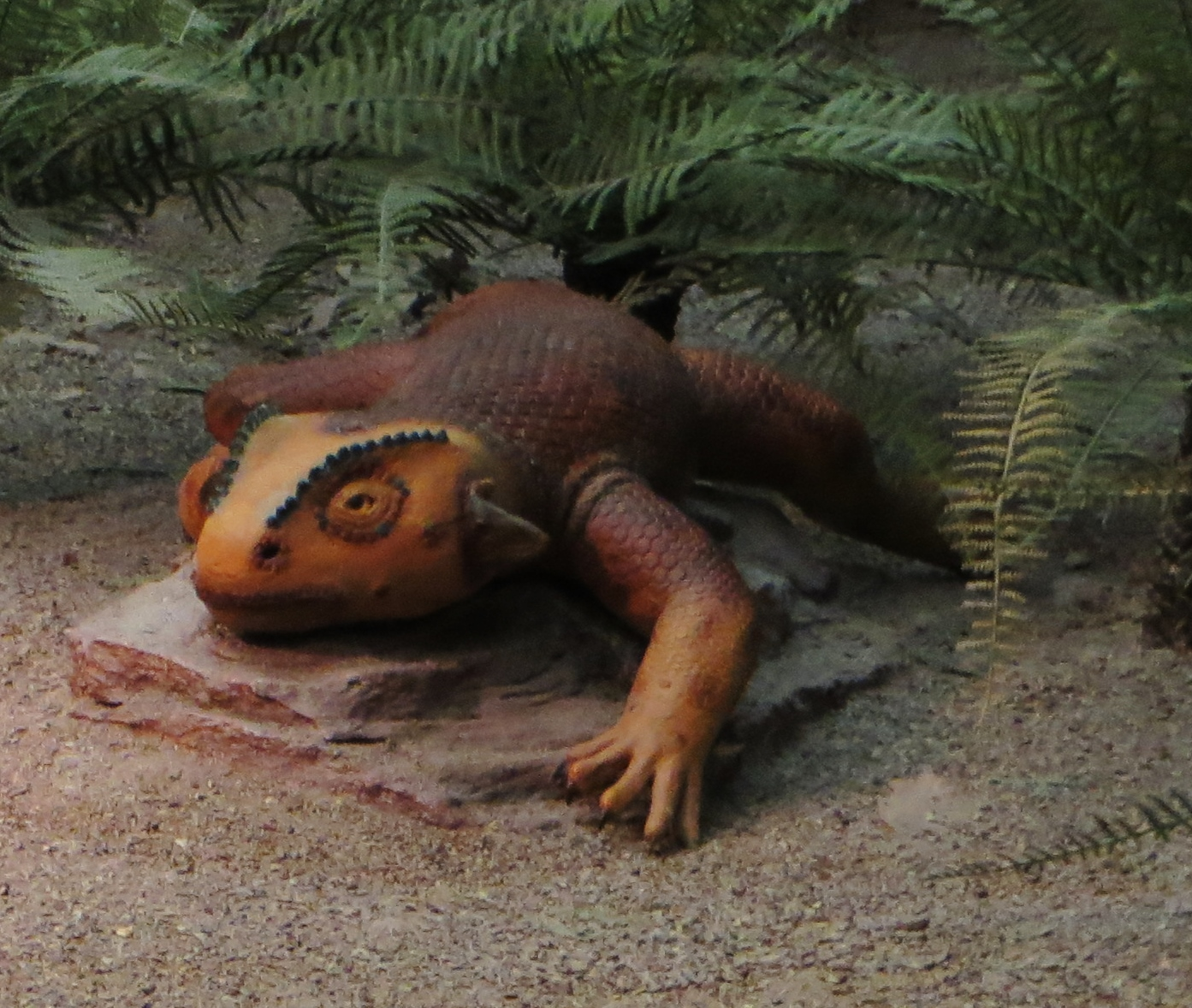
Model

Koiloskiosaurus is an extinct genus of procolophonid parareptile from the Early Triassic of Germany. The type and only species Koiloskiosaurus coburgensis was named by German paleontologist Friedrich von Huene in 1911 from a layer of rocks called the Buntsandstein. Koiloskiosaurus coburgensis is known from a block of three fossilized skeletons preserved together. Given that the skeletons are oriented in the same direction, the individuals most likely died in a burrow. Features of the skeletons of Koiloskiosaurus and other procolophonids, such as robust limbs and solid, immovable skull bones, are also taken as evidence that they were burrowers.
