= Leptopleuroninae =

Leptopleuroninae Temporal range: Early — Late Triassic

Scientific classification
- Domain: Eukaryota
- Kingdom: Animalia
- Phylum: Chordata
- Clade: †Parareptilia
- Order: †Procolophonomorpha
- Family: †Procolophonidae
- Subfamily: †Leptopleuroninae; Ivakhnenko, 1979

Genera
- †Basileosaurus?; †Cornualbus; †Hwiccewyrm; †Hypsognathus; †Koiloskiosaurus; †Leptopleuron; †Libognathus; †Mandaphon; †Neoprocolophon; †Pentaedrusaurus; †Phonodus; †Sclerosaurus; †Scoloparia; †Soturnia; †Threordatoth

Extinct subfamily of reptiles

Leptopleuroninae is an extinct subfamily of procolophonid reptiles. It is defined as all taxa closer to Leptopleuron lacertinum than to Procolophon trigoniceps. The oldest member of Leptopleuroninae is Phonodus dutoitorum from the Induan age of the Early Triassic. It is the only procolophonid group that survived into the Late Triassic.

== Phylogeny ==
A cladogram showing relationships within Procolophonidae after Modesto et al., 2010:

- Procolophonidae
  - Coletta seca
  - Pintosaurus magnidentis
  - Sauropareion anoplus
  - Kitchingnathus untabeni
  - - Phaanthosaurus sp.
    - - Theledectinae
      - - Tichvinskia vjatkensis
        - - Procolophoninae
          - - Leptopleuroninae
              - Pentaedrusaurus ordosianus
              - - Neoprocolophon asiaticus
                - Phonodus dutoitorum
                - clade "N"
                  - - Sclerosaurus armatus
                    - Scoloparia glyphanodon
                  - - Leptopleuron lacertinum
                    - - Soturnia caliodon
                      - Hypsognathus fenneri

Below are two cladograms that follow phylogenetic analyses by Butler et al. (2023):

Analyses 1 and 3: Strict consensus of 760 and 18 most parsimonious trees (MPTs).

- Leptopleuroninae
  - Neoprocolophon
  - Pentaedrusaurus
  - - Mandaphon
    - - - Scoloparia
        - Sclerosaurus
      - - Hwiccewyrm
        - Hypsognathus
        - Soturnia
        - Leptopleuron

Analysis 2: Single MPT.

- - Leptopleuroninae
    - - Kapes bentoni
      - - Thelephon
        - Kapes majmesculae
    - - Pentaedrusaurus
      - - - Anomoiodon
          - - Theledectes
            - - Procolina
              - Phonodus
        - - Mandaphon
          - - Neoprocolophon
            - - - Scoloparia
                - Sclerosaurus
              - - Hwiccewyrm
                - - Leptopleuron
                  - - Hypsognathus
                    - Soturnia
