= New Red Sandstone =

Geological formation in the United Kingdom

New Red Sandstone Supergroup
- Stratigraphic range: Permian-Triassic; ~300–200 Ma
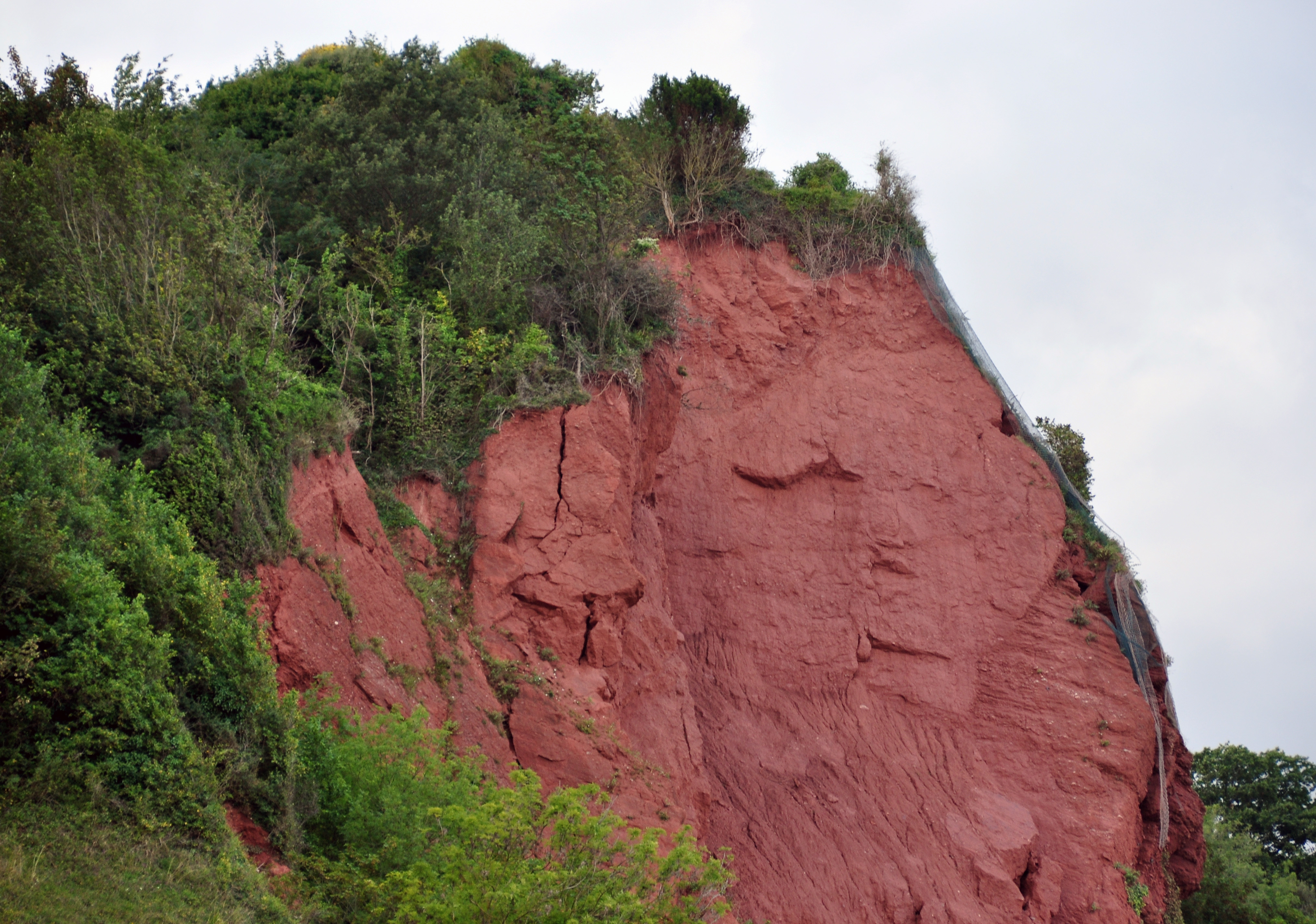
- Cliff of New Red Sandstone in Oddicombe, Devon
- Type: Supergroup
- Sub-units: Mercia Mudstone Group; Sherwood Sandstone Group; Aylesbeare Mudstone Group; Exeter Group
- Underlies: Penarth Group
- Overlies: Unconformity with folded Devonian and Carboniferous rocks
- Thickness: up to 2,000 m (6,600 ft)

Lithology
- Primary: Sandstone
- Other: Arkose, conglomerate, breccio-conglomerate

Location
- Country: United Kingdom
- Extent: Originally in Scotland, range extended to all red-bed sequences of Permian and Triassic age in southwest England, and parts of northwest and northeast England.

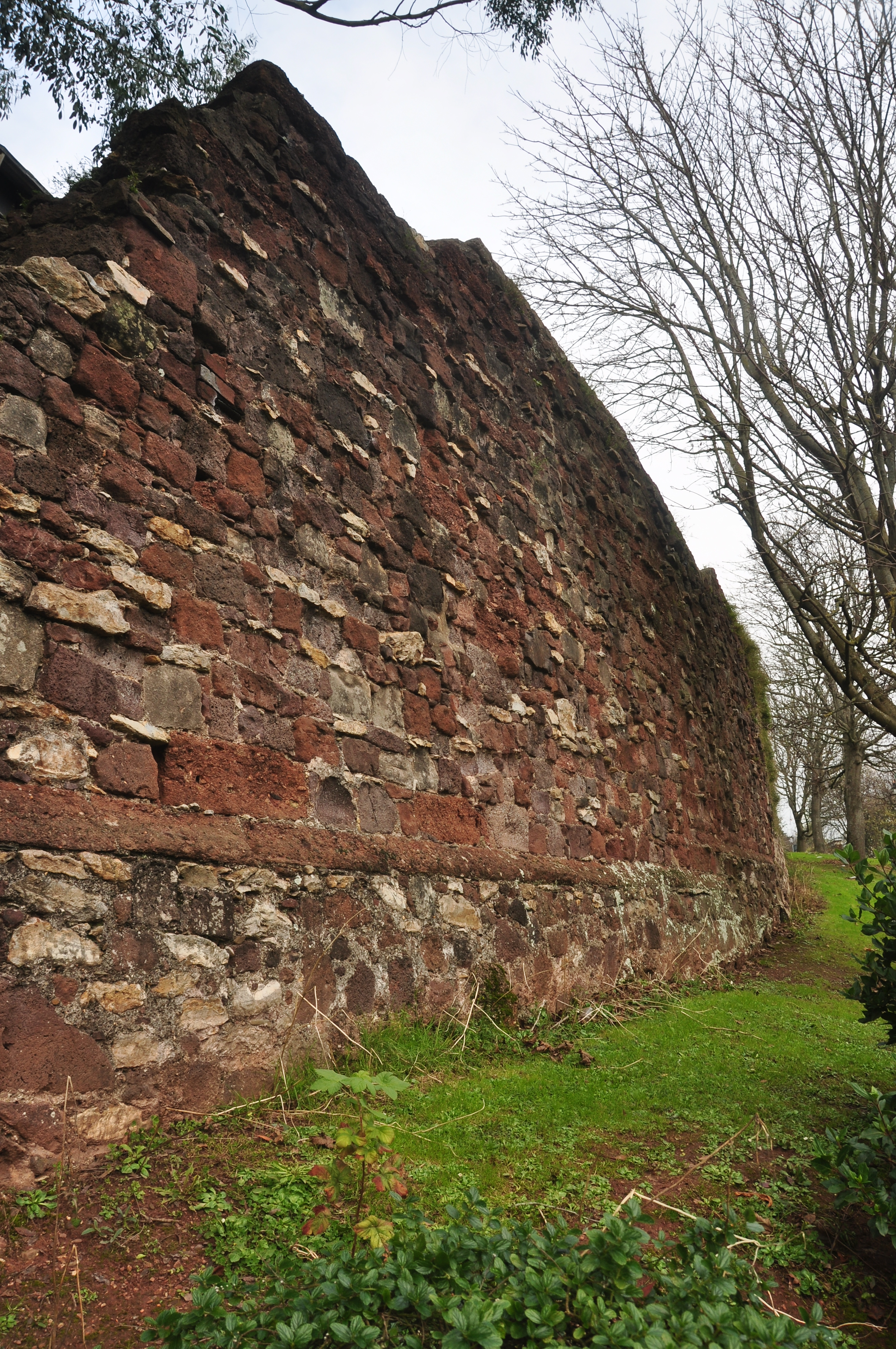
Exeter, Devon, ancient city walls of Isca Dumnoniorum with medieval and Roman elements

The New Red Sandstone, chiefly in British geology, is composed of beds of red sandstone and associated rocks laid down throughout the Permian (300 million years ago) to the end of the Triassic (about 200 million years ago), that underlie the Jurassic-Triassic age Penarth Group. The name distinguishes it from the Old Red Sandstone which is largely Devonian in age, and with which it was originally confused due to their similar composition.

Its upper layers consist of mudstones, but most of the formation consists of reddish to yellowish sandstones, interbedded with rare evaporite minerals such as halite and gypsum. These indicate deposition within a hot and arid palaeo-environment, such as a desert or sabkha.

== Geographical distribution ==
The New Red Sandstone was originally identified in Scotland, at quarries in Elgin. It covers large parts of the Moray Firth Basin. In this area it overlies the Old Red Sandstone unconformably (missing the intervening rocks), and both sandstones were used extensively in architecture in the Highlands and Islands of Scotland. It also covers much of central England, where it generally forms a low-lying plain except for the Mid Severn Sandstone Plateau. Thick layers (up to 1,100 metres (3,600 ft) thick) are present in the faulted Cheshire Basin which also extends beneath north Shropshire. There are numerous escarpments forming small prominent hills within this area. The sandstone also underlies parts of Lancashire and Cumbria, and east of the Pennines it extends through Nottinghamshire and central Yorkshire. Smaller outcrops occur in other parts of Britain such as the Red Cliffs of Dawlish and East Devon.

== Lithology ==
In terms of its lithology, the New Red Sandstone comprises true sandstones, mudrocks and evaporite strata. The sandstone units are monomineralic, consisting only of quartz grains (negligible amounts of other minerals may be present), and they are cemented together with the ferric iron oxide haematite (Fe_{2}O_{3}). The presence of this particular iron oxide is evidence for a terrestrial environment of deposition such as a desert, and gives the rocks the red colour which they are named after. The common effect of rusting produces exactly the same deposit, but as a result of a different process. The sandstone units generally lack fossils (as do most terrestrial rocks). The grains in the member have a high degree of sphericity, are very well sorted and typically have a small size range (0.5 to 2 millimetres (0.020 to 0.079 in)).

The NRS is a texturally mature rock. Certain units of the New Red Sandstone (e.g. Hopeman Sandstone Formation and Helsby Sandstone Formation) feature commonly as building stone due to their abundance and mechanical strength.

== Fossil content ==
The New Red Sandstone has yielded many fossils, including the world-famous Elgin Reptiles. These are late Permian to Late Triassic in age, and include mammal-like reptiles and some of the earliest predecessors of dinosaurs. An earliest Permian (Asselian) fauna is known from the Kenilworth Sandstone Formation of the English Midlands, including primitive synapsids (Hypselohaptodus) and temnospondyl amphibians. The Helsby Sandstone Formation (formerly the Otter Sandstone) near Sidmouth, Devon, has yielded a diverse Middle Triassic fauna, including fish, amphibians and reptiles.

== Building uses ==
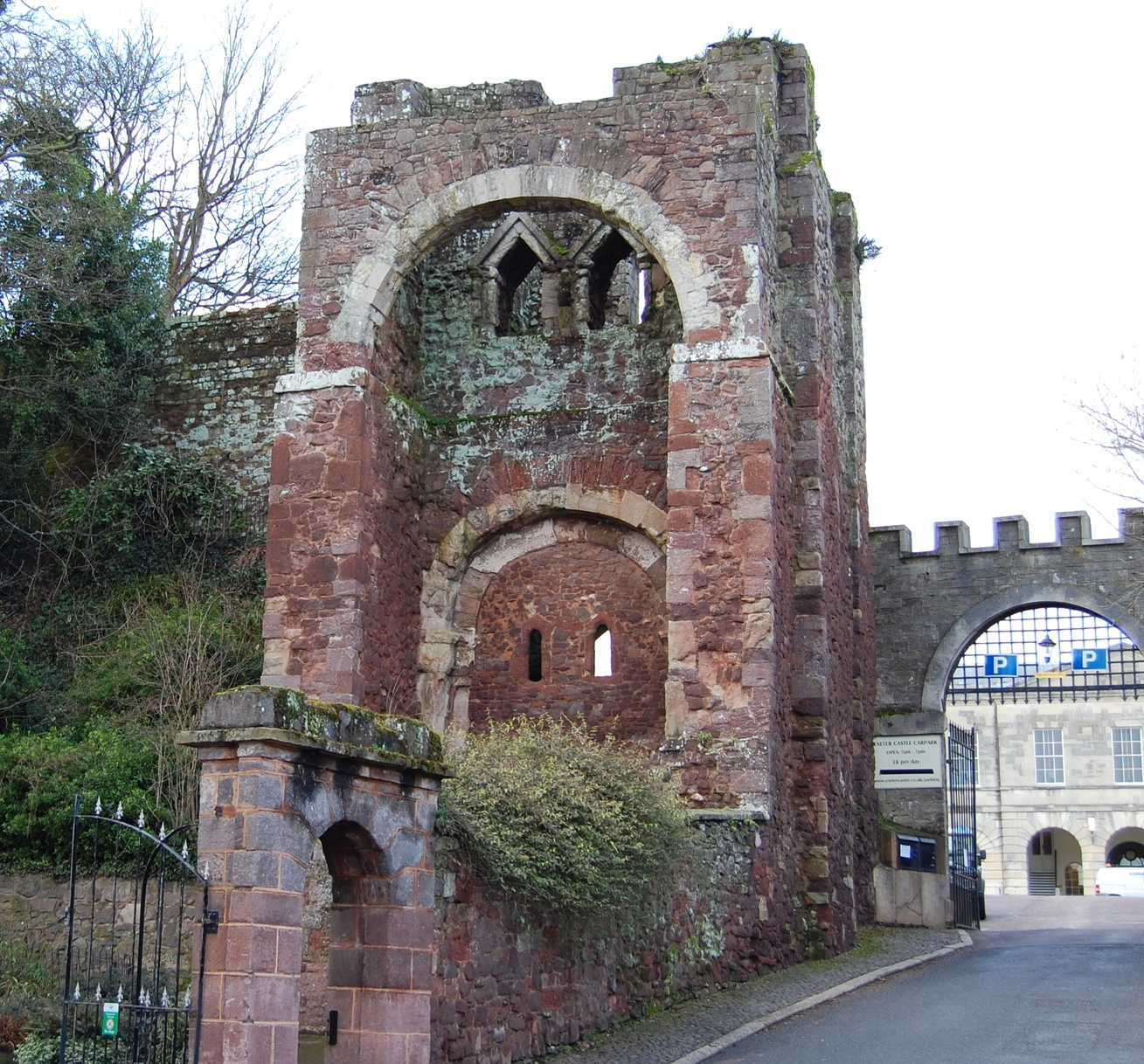
Exeter Castle, Devon, c. 1068 Anglo-Saxon and Norman elements of New Red Sandstone with reused earlier Roman elements

Many ancient buildings of Devon Red Sandstone can be found in Exeter the ancient capital of Devon, notably the castle, Roman / medieval city walls, several churches and many buildings of the Cathedral Close. The local quarry was at Heavitree by which name the local sandstone – actually a type of breccia – is generally known.

- Rougemont Castle, Exeter, Devon, c. 1068 with earlier elements
- Crediton Parish Church founded c. 910, dates from c. 1130 with earlier elements
- St Petrock's Church, Exeter, Devon, before 11th century
- St Olave's Church, Exeter, Devon founded 1053
- Bishop's Palace, Paignton, Devon
- St Mary's Church, Totnes, Devon, c. 1450
- Royal Albert Memorial Museum, Exeter, Devon, 1868

== See also ==
- British Isles § Geography
- Bunter (geology)
- Buntsandstein
- Geology of Great Britain
- Haffield Breccia
- Old Red Sandstone
