= Mandaphon =

Mandaphon Temporal range: Middle Triassic

Scientific classification
- Domain: Eukaryota
- Kingdom: Animalia
- Phylum: Chordata
- Clade: †Parareptilia
- Order: †Procolophonomorpha
- Family: †Procolophonidae
- Subfamily: †Leptopleuroninae
- Genus: †Mandaphon; Tsuji, 2018

Type species
- †Mandaphon nadra Tsuji, 2018

Extinct genus of reptiles

Mandaphon is an extinct genus of procolophonid from the Middle Triassic Manda Formation of Tanzania. It contains a single species, Mandaphon nadra.
