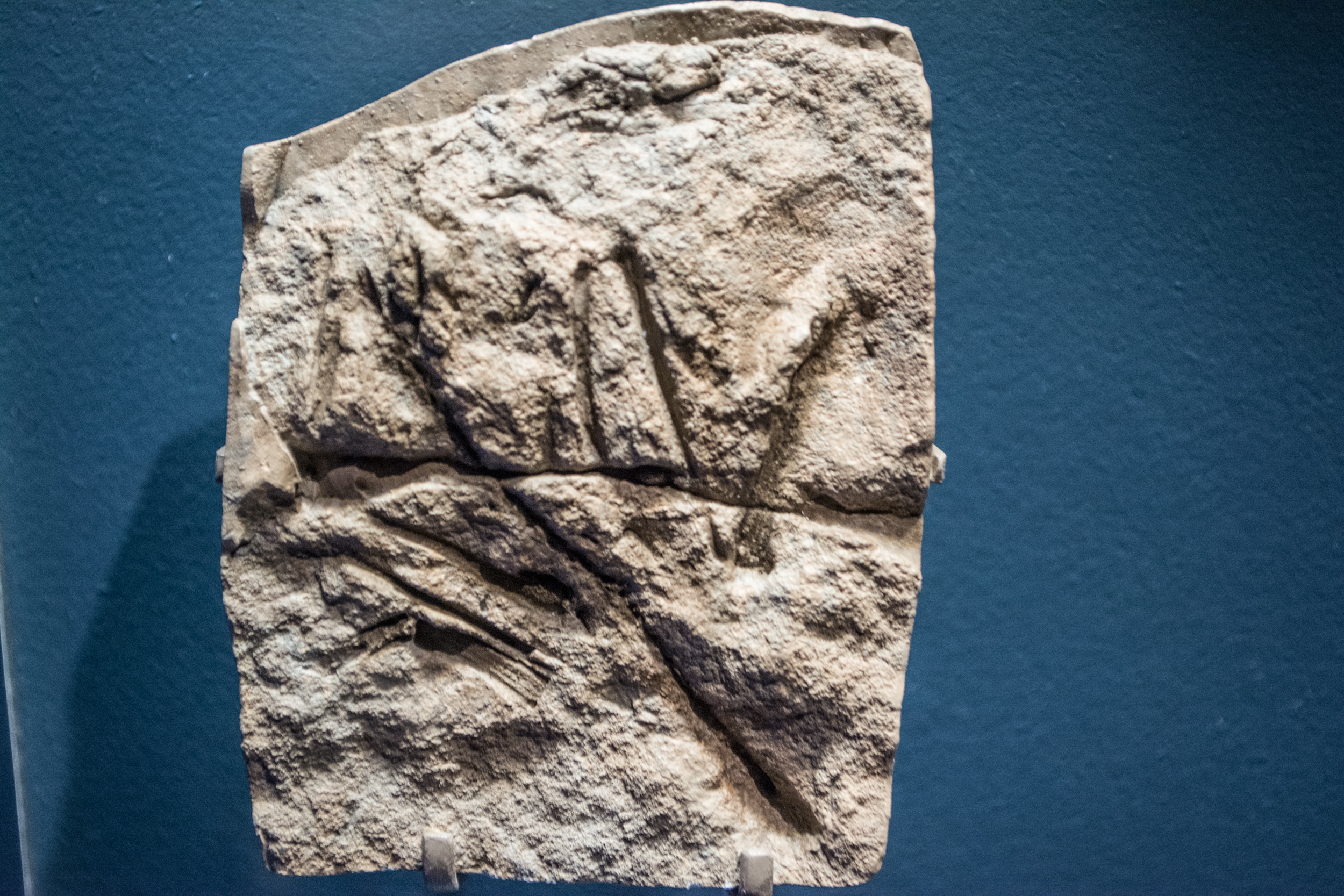
- Cast of holotype specimen NHMUK R3556

Scientific classification
- Kingdom: Animalia
- Phylum: Chordata
- Class: Reptilia
- Clade: Ornithodira
- Clade: †Pterosauromorpha
- Family: †Scleromochlidae; Huene, 1914
- Genus: †Scleromochlus; Woodward, 1907
- Species: †S. taylori

Binomial name
- †Scleromochlus taylori Woodward, 1907

= Scleromochlus =

Scleromochlus Temporal range: Late Triassic, 235–205 Ma

Extinct genus of reptiles

Scleromochlus (from Greek: σκληρός sklērós, 'hard' and Greek: μοχλός mokhlós, 'lever') is an extinct genus of small pterosauromorph archosaurs from the Late Triassic Lossiemouth Sandstone of Scotland. The genus contains the type and only species Scleromochlus taylori, named by Arthur Smith Woodward in 1907.

== Discovery ==
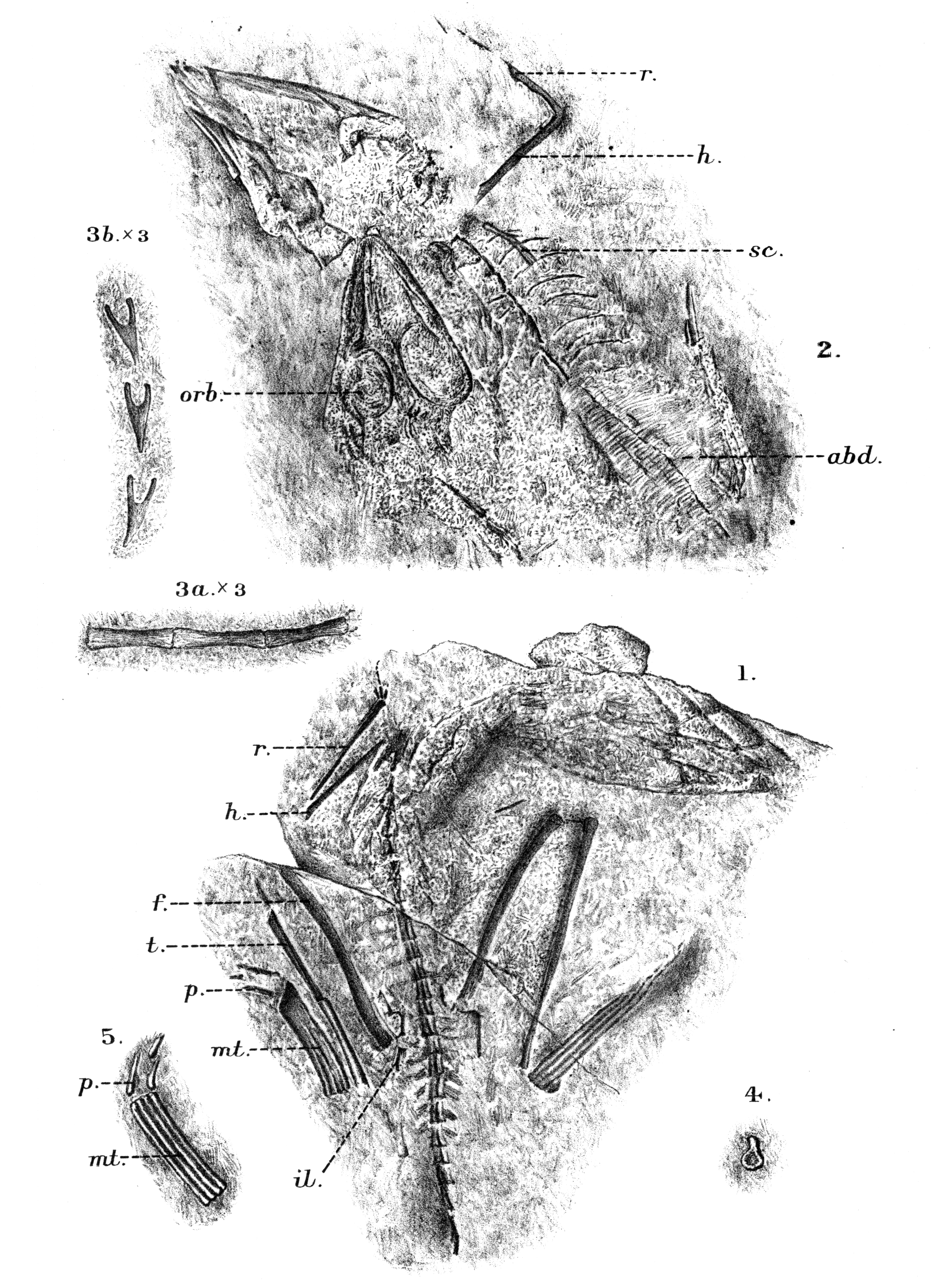
Lithograph of the holotype

Its fossils have been found in the Carnian Lossiemouth Sandstone of Scotland. The holotype was discovered around 1900 and is listed as specimen BMNH R3556, a partial skeleton preserved as an impression in sandstone, with portions of the skull and tail missing.

Arthur Smith Woodward named and described Scleromochlus taylori in 1907.

== Description ==
Scleromochlus taylori was about 18.1 centimetres (7.1 in) long, with long hind legs; it may have been capable of four-legged and two-legged locomotion. Studies about its gait suggest that it engaged in kangaroo- or springhare-like plantigrade hopping; however, a 2020 reassessment of Scleromochlus by Bennett suggested that it was a "sprawling quadrupedal hopper analogous to frogs." If Scleromochlus is indeed related to pterosaurs, this may offer insight as to how the latter evolved, since early pterosaurs also show adaptations for saltatorial locomotion.

== Classification ==
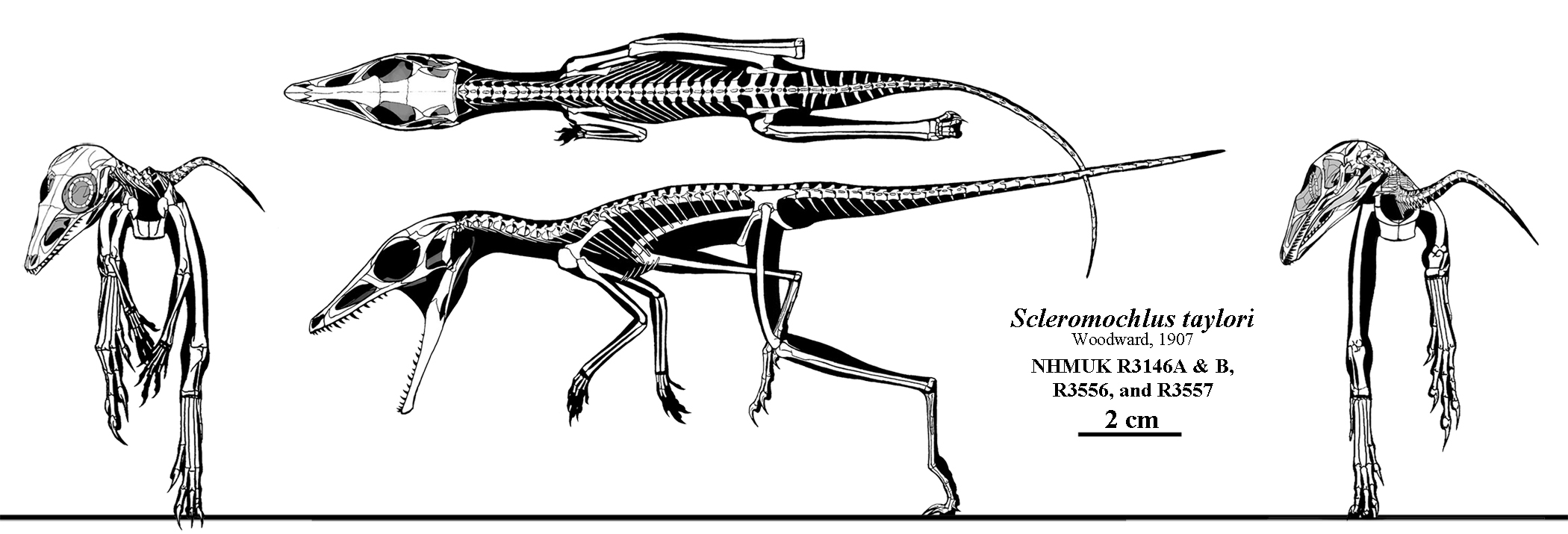
Hypothetical skeletal diagram

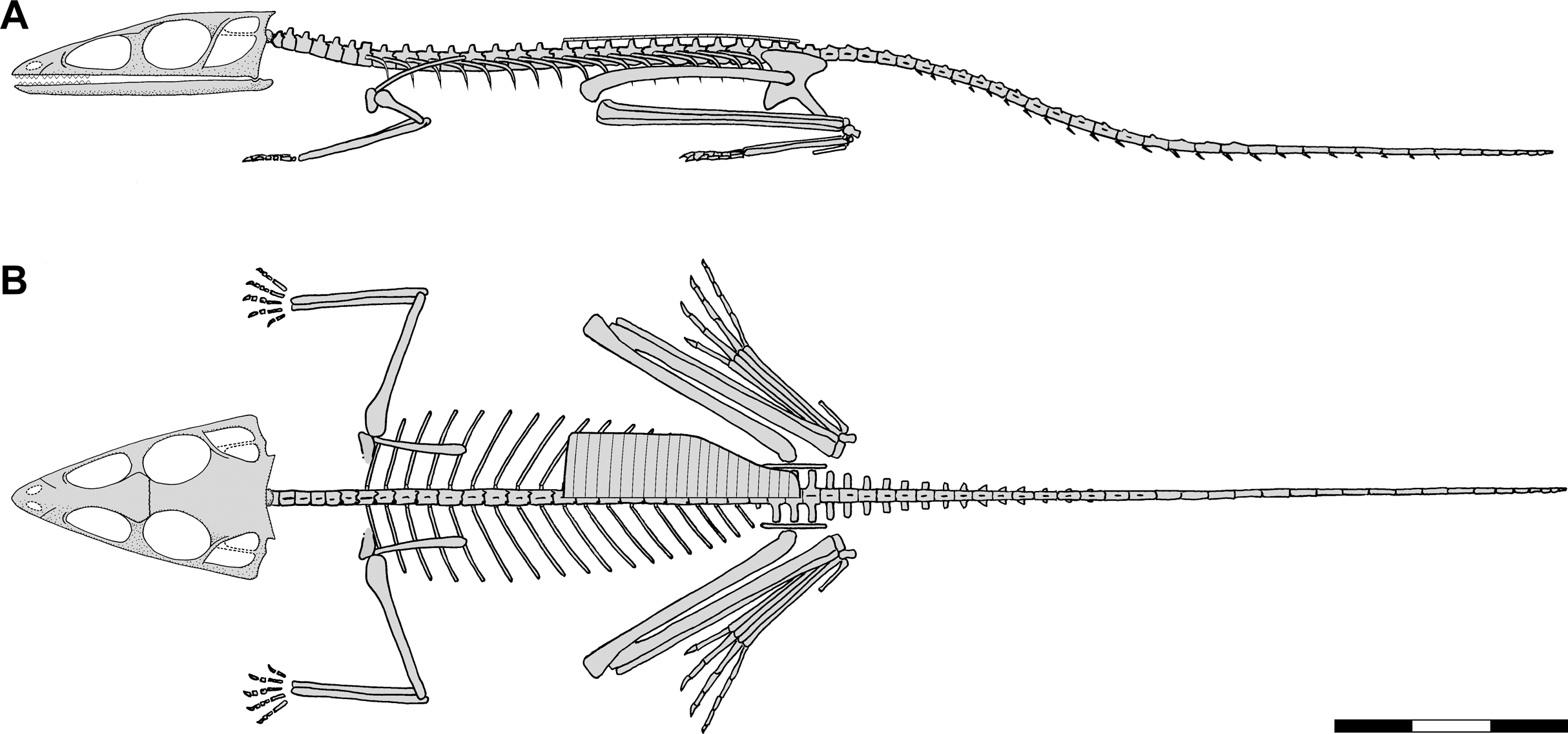
Skeletal reconstruction as a basal archosauriform (from Bennett, 2020)

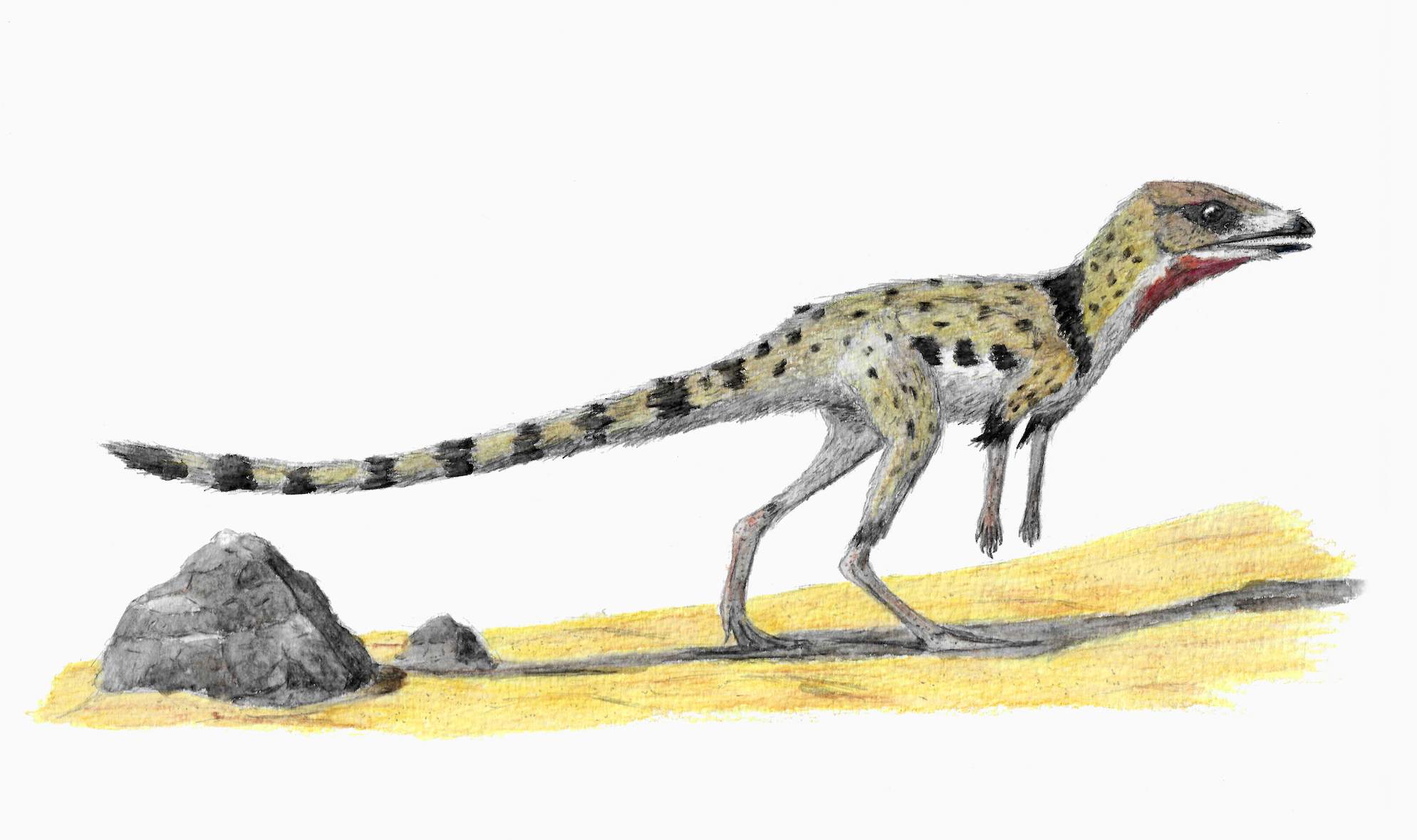
Life restoration of Scleromochlus as a lagerpetid-like pterosauromorph (following Foffa, 2022)

A lightly built cursorial animal, its phylogenetic position has been debated; as different analyses have found it to be either the basal-most ornithodiran, the sister-taxon to Pterosauria, or a basal member of Avemetatarsalia that lies outside of Ornithodira. In the phylogenetic analyses conducted by Nesbitt et al. (2017) Scleromochlus was recovered either as a basal member of Dinosauromorpha or as a non-aphanosaurian, non-pterosaur basal avemetatarsalian. However, the authors stressed that scoring Scleromochlus was challenging given the small size and poor preservation of the fossils, and stated that it could not be scored for many of the important characters that optimize near the base of Avemetatarsalia.

In 2020, Bennett interpreted Scleromochlus as possessing certain characteristics, including osteoderms and a crurotarsal morphology of the ankle, which suggested that Scleromochlus was not closely related to ornithodirans. Instead, he argued for a position of Scleromochlus among the Doswelliidae or elsewhere among basal members of the Archosauriformes.

However, in 2022, Foffa and colleagues reconstructed a complete skeleton using microcomputed tomographic scans of the seven specimens found to date. This enabled a new phylogenetic analysis to be undertaken, which strongly supported the hypothesis that Scleromochlus was a member of the Pterosauromorpha – either as a genus of the Lagerpetidae family (shown to be a part of Pterosauromorpha in 2020) or as the sister group to pterosaurs and lagerpetids. Previous alternative classifications were demonstrated to have been based on misinterpretations of incomplete or ambiguous anatomical features found in the fossil record. Foffa et al. followed up with a more extensive redescription of Scleromochlus fossils in 2023.
