= Neoprocolophon =

Neoprocolophon Temporal range: Early Triassic

Scientific classification
- Domain: Eukaryota
- Kingdom: Animalia
- Phylum: Chordata
- Clade: †Parareptilia
- Order: †Procolophonomorpha
- Family: †Procolophonidae
- Subfamily: †Leptopleuroninae
- Genus: †Neoprocolophon; Young, 1957

Type species
- †Neoprocolophon asiaticus Young, 1957

Extinct genus of reptiles

Neoprocolophon is an extinct genus of procolophonid parareptile, known from the single species Neoprocolophon asiaticus from the Middle Triassic of China. It was named by Chinese paleontologist Yang Zhongjian (better known as C. C. Young) in 1957 from the Ermaying Formation.
