= Soturnia =

Soturnia Temporal range: Late Triassic ~221.5–205.6 Ma

Scientific classification
- Kingdom: Animalia
- Phylum: Chordata
- Class: Reptilia
- Subclass: †Parareptilia
- Order: †Procolophonomorpha
- Family: †Procolophonidae
- Tribe: †Leptopleuronini
- Genus: †Soturnia; Cisneros & Schultz, 2003

Type species
- †Soturnia caliodon Cisneros & Schultz, 2003

Extinct genus of reptiles

Soturnia is an extinct genus of procolophonid parareptile. It is known from rocks of the Late Triassic-age Caturrita Formation of the municipality of Faxinal do Soturno in the geopark of Paleorrota, Brazil. Soturnia was named in 2003 by Cisneros and Schultz; the type species is S. caliodon. It was a leptopleuroninae procolophonid.

== Palaeobiology ==
=== Ontogeny ===
As S. caliodon matured, its rostrum grew longer and the number of teeth it contained increased.
