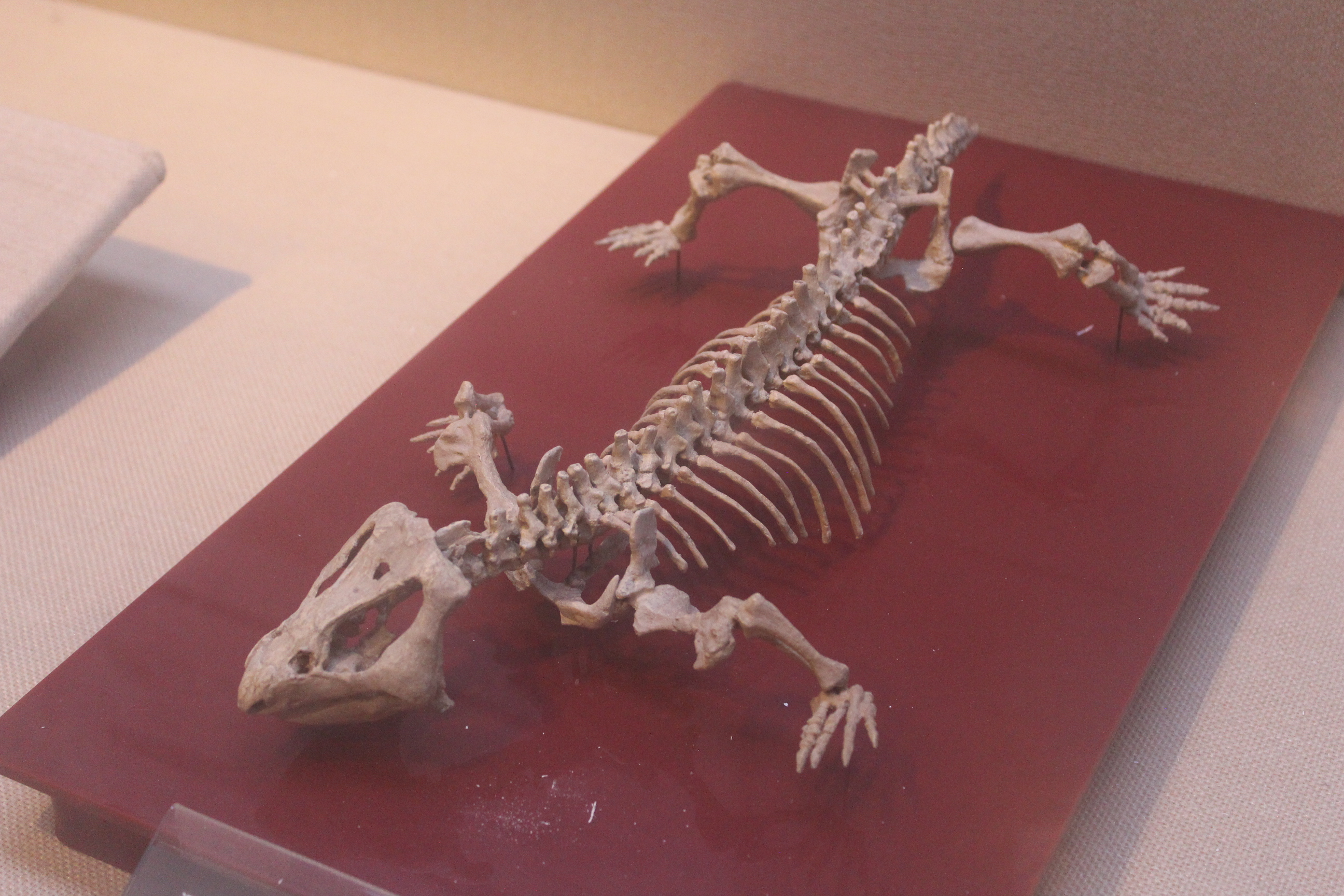
- Skeletal cast mount, Paleozoological Museum of China

Scientific classification
- Domain: Eukaryota
- Kingdom: Animalia
- Phylum: Chordata
- Clade: †Parareptilia
- Order: †Procolophonomorpha
- Family: †Procolophonidae
- Subfamily: †Leptopleuroninae
- Genus: †Pentaedrusaurus; Li, 1989

Type species
- †Pentaedrusaurus ordosianus Li, 1989

= Pentaedrusaurus =

Pentaedrusaurus Temporal range: Early Triassic

Extinct genus of reptiles

Pentaedrusaurus (meaning "pentagonal [skull] lizard") is an extinct genus of procolophonid parareptile from the Early Triassic of China. It is one of the most basal members of the procolophonid subfamily Leptopleuroninae. The only known species of Pentaedrusaurus, P. ordosianus, was named in 1989 from the Heshanggou Formation.
