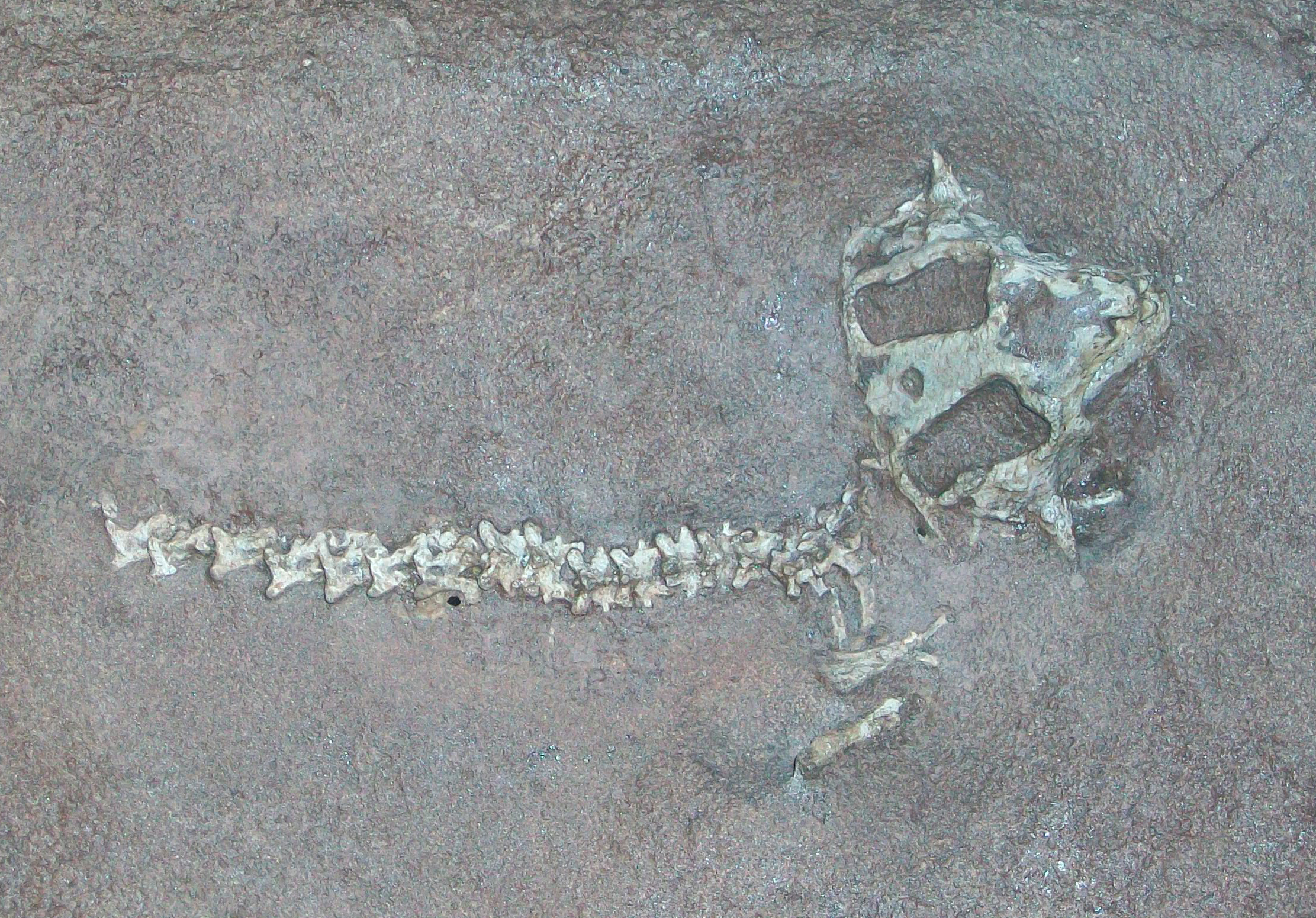
- Fossil of Hypsognathus fenneri (AMNH 1676) in the American Museum of Natural History

Scientific classification
- Domain: Eukaryota
- Kingdom: Animalia
- Phylum: Chordata
- Clade: †Parareptilia
- Order: †Procolophonomorpha
- Family: †Procolophonidae
- Subfamily: †Leptopleuroninae
- Genus: †Hypsognathus; Gilmore, 1928

Type species
- †Hypsognathus fenneri Gilmore, 1928

= Hypsognathus =

Hypsognathus Temporal range: Late Triassic

Extinct genus of reptiles

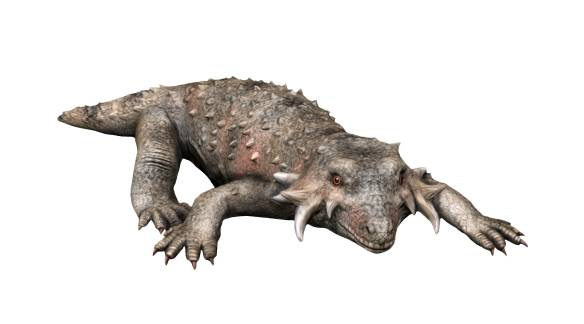
Life restoration of Hypsognathus

Hypsognathus (from Greek: ῠ̔́ψος húpsos, 'height' and Greek: γνάθος gnáthos, 'jaw') is an extinct genus of procolophonid parareptile from the Late Triassic of New Jersey, Connecticut, and Nova Scotia.

Hypsognathus resembled a moderately sized lizard, with a length of 33 centimetres (13 in), although it was unrelated to modern lizards. Because of its broad teeth, Hypsognathus is thought to have been a herbivore. Its body is low and broad and it has a relatively short tail. Hypsognathus has some spikes on the side of its head, probably for protection against predators.

Multiple specimens from the Magnesian Conglomerate of England that were discovered during the 1970s by Jeanne Evans were initially referred to cf. Hypsognathus in 2016 before being moved to a separate species, Hwiccewyrm trispiculum in 2023.
