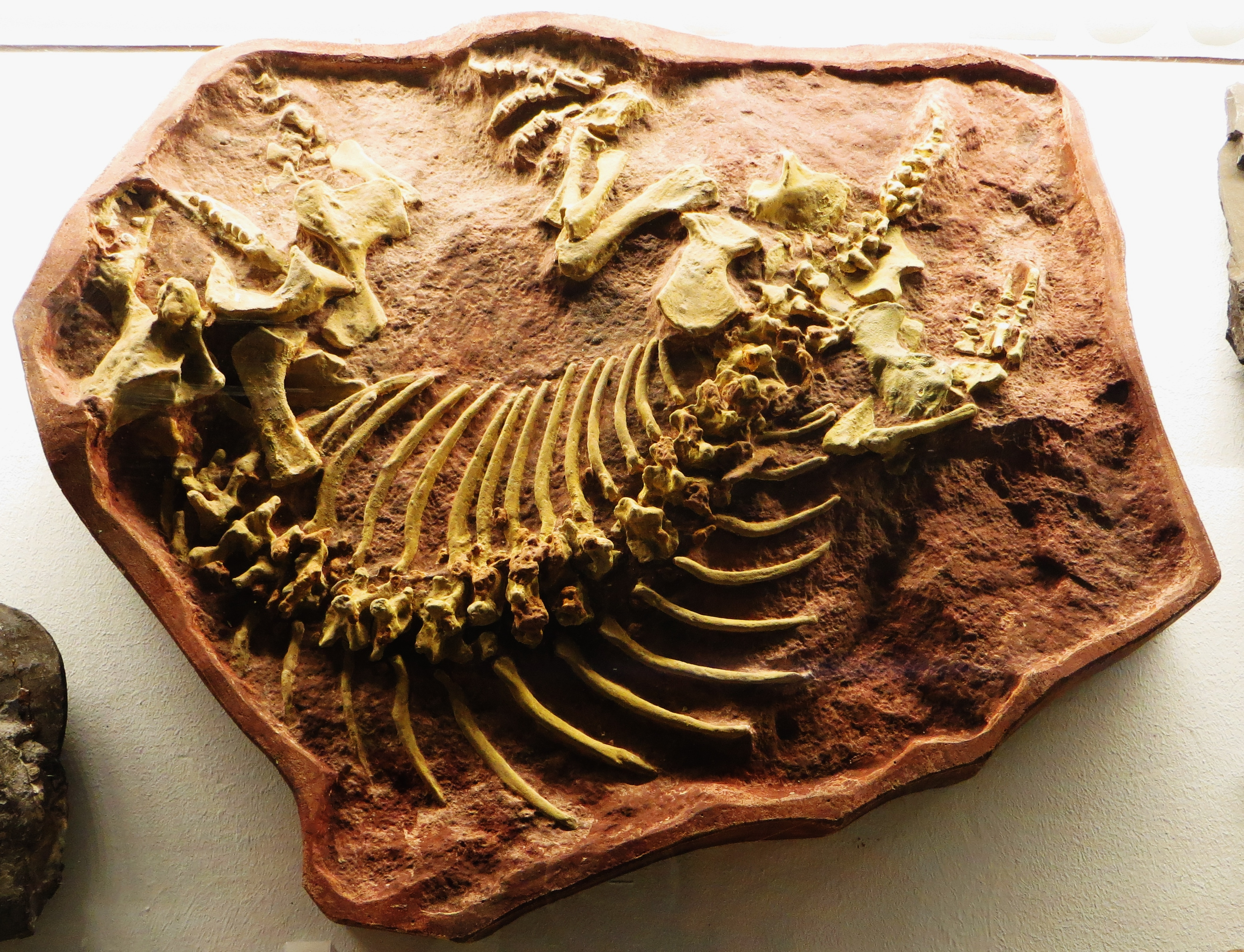
- Fossil

Scientific classification
- Kingdom: Animalia
- Phylum: Chordata
- Class: Reptilia
- Subclass: †Parareptilia
- Order: †Procolophonomorpha
- Family: †Procolophonidae
- Tribe: †Sclerosaurini
- Genus: †Sclerosaurus von Meyer, 1857

Type species
- †Sclerosaurus armatus von Meyer, 1857

Synonyms
- Aristodesmus ruetimeyeri (Seeley, 1896)

= Sclerosaurus =

Sclerosaurus Temporal range: Early-Middle Triassic, Olenekian–Anisian

Extinct genus of reptiles

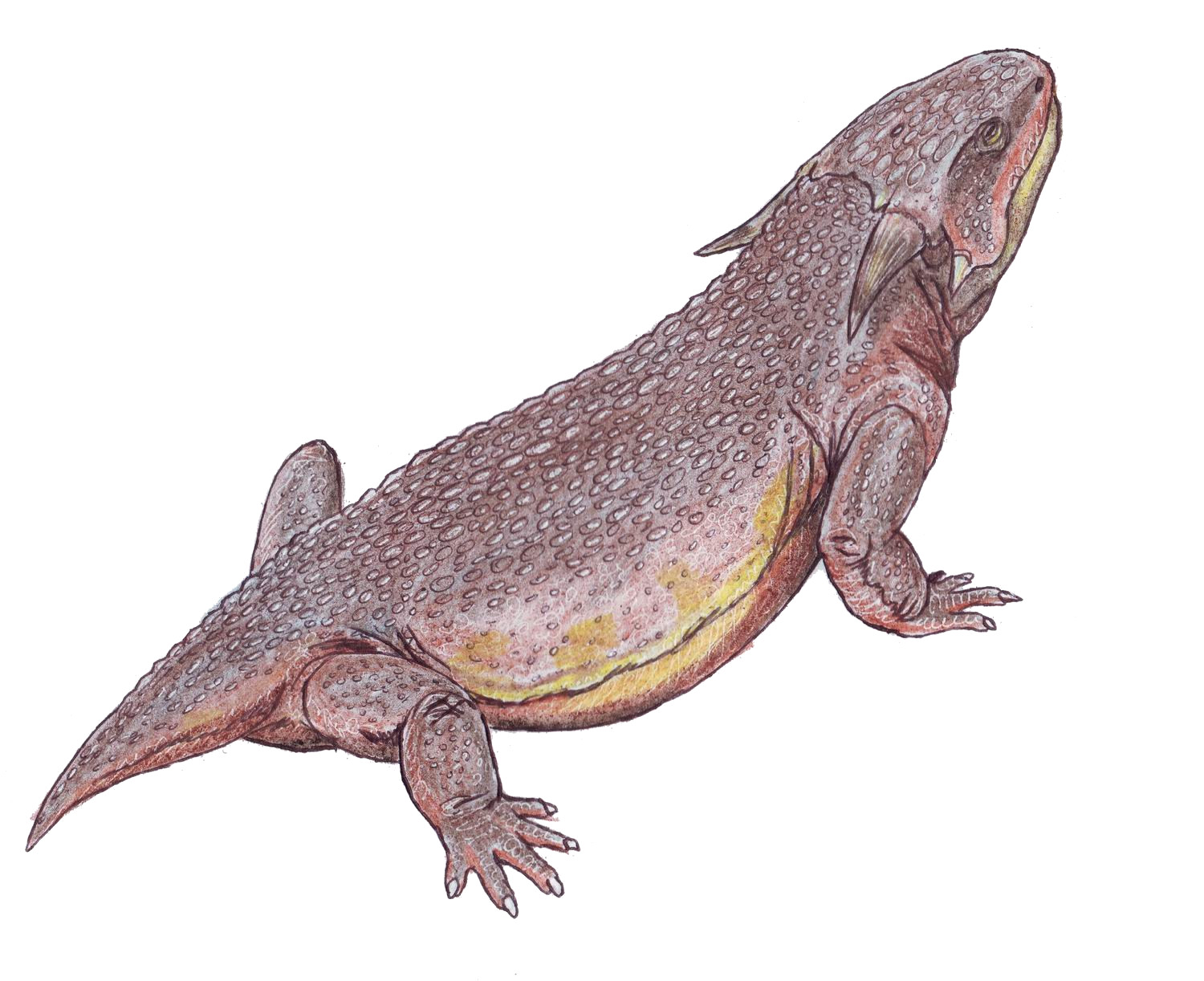
Restoration

Sclerosaurus is an extinct genus of procolophonid parareptile known from the Early to Middle Triassic of Germany and Switzerland. It contains a single species, Sclerosaurus armatus. It was fairly small, about 30 cm long, distinguished from other known parareptiles by the possession of long, backwardly projecting spikes, rear lower jaw teeth with slightly imbricating crowns, and a narrow band of back armor comprising two or three rows of sculptured osteoderms on either side of the midline.

Traditional classifications, e.g. Carroll (1988) placed Sclerosaurus with the procolophonids, however some phylogenetic studies have found it to be a close relative of the pareiasaurs, and together with that group it forms the clade Pareiasauroidea. More recent phylogenetic analyses place Sclerosaurus within Procolophonidae as originally suggested, and support its referral to the Leptopleuroninae. Sclerosaurus is most closely related to Scoloparia glyphanodon from Nova Scotia, Canada, and together they form the Sclerosaurini tribe within Leptopleuroninae.
