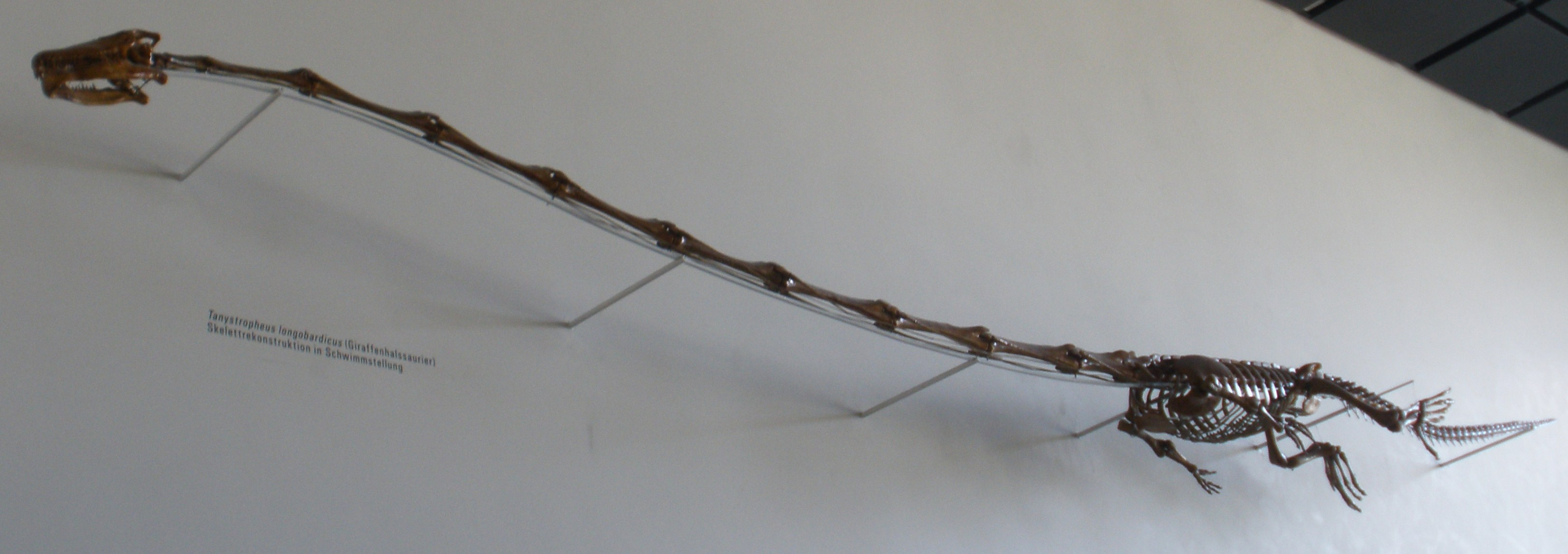
- Modelled Tanystropheus skeleton at the Natural History Museum of the University of Zurich

Scientific classification
- Kingdom: Animalia
- Phylum: Chordata
- Class: Reptilia
- Family: †Tanystropheidae
- Genus: †Tanystropheus; Meyer, 1852

Type species
- †Tanystropheus conspicuus Von Meyer, 1855

Other species
- †T. longobardicus (Bassani, 1886); †T. hydroides Spiekman et al., 2020

Synonyms
- Genus synonymy: Tanystrophaeus Von Meyer, 1852; Macroscelosaurus Münster vide Meyer, 1852 (nomen oblitum); Tribelesodon Bassani, 1886; Procerosaurus von Huene, 1902; Pectenosaurus Huene, 1902; Chelyzoon Huene, 1902; Megacnemus Huene, 1955; Protanystropheus? Sennikov, 2011; Species synonymy: T. biharicus Jurcsák, 1975 (synonym of T. longobardicus?); T. haasi Rieppel, 2001 (nomen dubium); T. meridensis Wild, 1980 (synonym of T. longobardicus)

= Tanystropheus =

Tanystropheus Temporal range: Anisian – early Carnian Possible late Olenekian and Norian records

Extinct genus of reptiles

Tanystropheus (Ancient Greek: τανυ~ 'long' + στροφευς 'vertebra') is an extinct genus of archosauromorph reptile which lived during the Triassic Period in Europe, Asia, and North America. It is recognizable by its extremely elongated neck, longer than the torso and tail combined. The neck is composed of 13 vertebrae, strengthened by long cervical ribs. Tanystropheus is one of the most well-described non-archosauriform archosauromorphs (reptiles closer to dinosaurs and crocodilians than to lizards). It is known from numerous fossils, including nearly complete skeletons. Some species within the genus may have reached a total length of 6 meters (20 ft), making Tanystropheus the longest non-archosauriform archosauromorph as well. Tanystropheus is the namesake of the family Tanystropheidae, a clade collecting many long-necked Triassic archosauromorphs previously described as "protorosaurs" or "prolacertiforms".

Tanystropheus contains at least three valid species as well as fossils which cannot be referred to a specific species. The type species of Tanystropheus is T. conspicuus, applied to particularly large fossils from Germany and Poland. Complete skeletons are common in the Besano Formation at Monte San Giorgio, on the border of Italy and Switzerland. Monte San Giorgio fossils belong to two species: the smaller T. longobardicus and the larger T. hydroides. When T. longobardicus was first described in 1886, it was initially mistaken for a pterosaur and given the name "Tribelesodon". Starting in the 1920s, systematic excavations at Monte San Giorgio unearthed many more Tanystropheus fossils, revealing that the supposed wing bones of "Tribelesodon" were actually neck vertebrae. T. hydroides was formally distinguished in 2020, mostly on the basis of its distinctive skull and the confirmation that the two different size forms are adults of different species.

Most Tanystropheus fossils hail from marine or coastal deposits of the Middle Triassic epoch (Anisian and Ladinian stages), with some exceptions. For example, a vertebra from Nova Scotia was recovered from primarily freshwater sediments. The youngest unambiguous fossils in the genus are a pair of well-preserved skeletons from the Zhuganpo Formation, a geological unit in China which dates to the earliest part of the Late Triassic (early Carnian stage). The oldest claims of Tanystropheus fossils belong to "T. antiquus", a European species from the latest part of the Early Triassic (late Olenekian stage). T. antiquus has a proportionally shorter neck than other Tanystropheus species, so in 2011 the species was moved to a separate genus, Protanystropheus. Several recent studies have concluded that "T." antiquus is not even part of the family Tanystropheidae, instead being closer to another long-necked early archosauromorph, Dinocephalosaurus.

The lifestyle of Tanystropheus has been the subject of much debate. Tanystropheus is unknown from drier environments and its neck is rather stiff and ungainly, suggesting a reliance on water. On the other hand, the limbs and tail lack most adaptations for swimming and are similar to those of land-based reptiles. Recent studies have supported an intermediate position, reconstructing Tanystropheus as an animal equally capable on land and in the water. Despite its length, the neck was lightweight and stabilized by tendons, so it would not have been a fatal hindrance to moving on land. The hindlimbs and the base of the tail were large and muscular, capable of short bursts of active swimming in shallow water. Tanystropheus was most likely a piscivorous (fish-eating) ambush predator. The narrow and tapering skull of T. longobardicus has three-cusped teeth at the back, suited for holding onto slippery prey, while the broader skull of T. hydroides has an interlocking set of large curved fangs at the front, similar to the fully aquatic plesiosaurs.

== History and species ==
=== German and Polish species ===
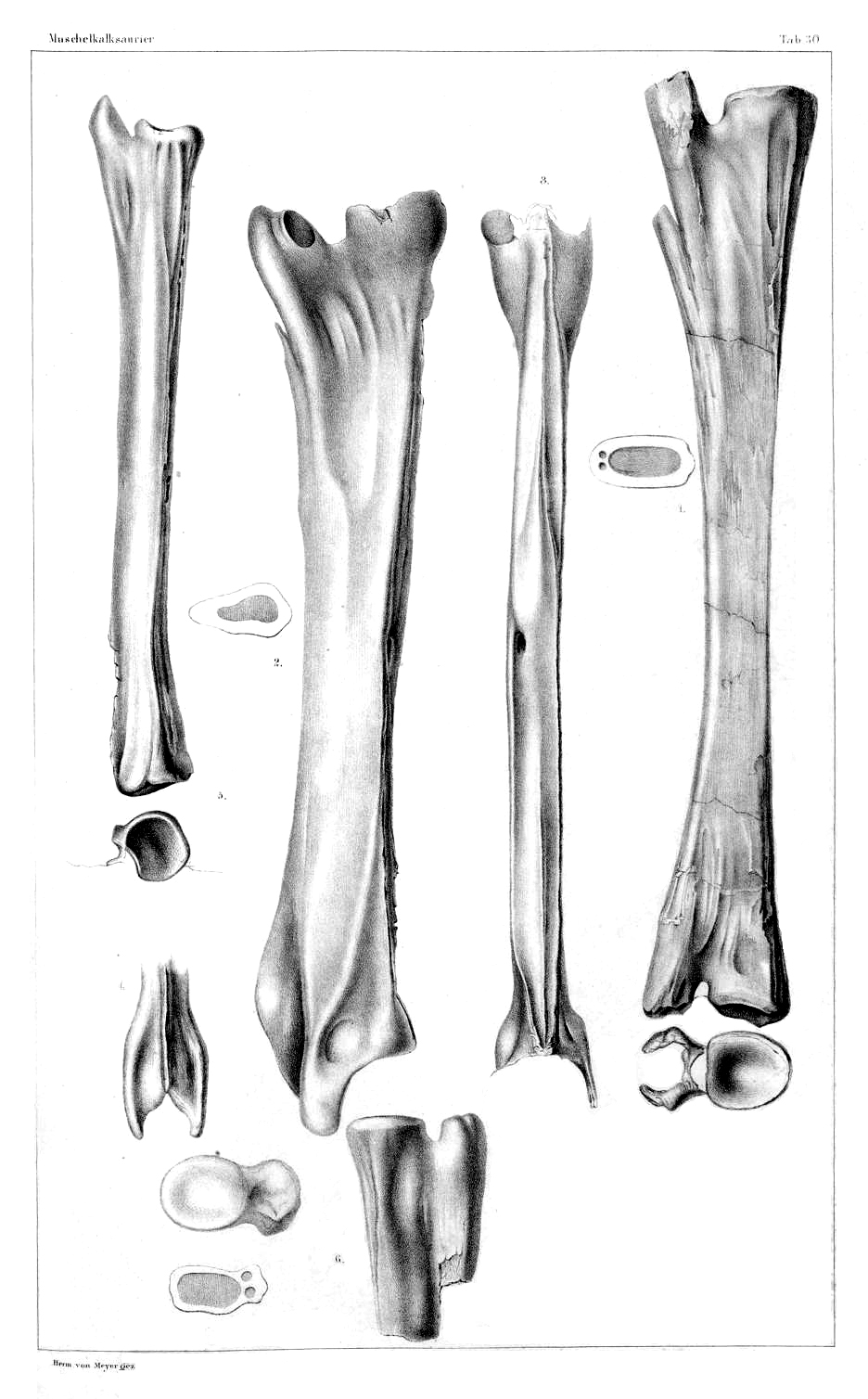
Type vertebrae of Tanystropheus conspicuus, described in 1855

The first Tanystropheus specimens to be described were found in the mid-19th century. They included eight large vertebrae from the Upper Muschelkalk of Germany, and a partial skeleton from the Lower Keuper of Poland. These geological units occupy part of the Middle Triassic, from the latest Anisian to middle Ladinian stages. Though the fossils were initially given the name Macroscelosaurus by Count Georg Zu Münster, the publication containing this name is lost and its genus is considered a nomen oblitum. In 1855, Hermann von Meyer supplied the name Tanystropheus conspicuus, the type species of Tanystropheus, to the fossils. They were later regarded as Tanystropheus fossils undiagnostic relative to other species, rendering T. conspicuus a nomen dubium possibly synonymous with T. hydroides. A 2026 redescription of T. conspicuus argued that it was a valid species based on distinctive aspects of its newly discovered skull material and 3D-preserved postcrania.

Count Münster had misidentified the slender, highly elongated neck vertebrae as limb bones of a reptile, reflected in his name Macroscelosaurus (meaning "long-limbed lizard"). Von Meyer in turn misinterpreted the fossils as supposed tail vertebrae (Schwanzwirbel) that came from a type of marine reptile clearly distinct from Nothosaurus and Pistosaurus. He noted their unusual length (von Meyer (1855, pg. 42) under the subheading "Wirbel von auffallender Länge" [Vertebrae of Conspicuous Length], a phrase that would match the meaning of his proposed scientific Latin binomial Tanystropheus conspicuus as "conspicuous long vertebra" from the Greek prefix tany- "long" and the noun stropheus (here meaning "vertebra") with the Latin adjective conspicuus "conspicuous, remarkable". The lack of a formal etymology for Tanystropheus from von Meyer, however, has led to confusion over the intended meaning and etymology of -stropheus in the name, a noun used to mean "vertebra" in Ancient Greek (στροφεύς) and in older medical terms (epistropheus), as well as in later scientific names (Spinostropheus, Lophostropheus, Manistropheus, etc.). Von Meyer's original meaning for Tanystropheus would be "long vertebra" as indicated in Richard Owen's Palaeontology (1861 edition, p. 462) rather than "long ribbon", "long joint", etc., as suggested in some recent sources.)

Over a thousand Tanystropheus conspicuus specimens have been recovered from a Lower Keuper (early Ladinian) bonebed near the Silesian village of Miedary. This is the largest known concentration of Tanystropheus fossils, more than double the number collected from Monte San Giorgio. Though the Miedary specimens are individually limited to isolated postcranial bones, they are preserved in three dimensions and show great potential for elucidating the morphology of the genus. The Miedary locality represents an isolated brackish body of water close to the coast, and the abundance of Tanystropheus fossils suggests that it was an animal well-suited for this kind of habitat.

In the late 1900s, Friedrich von Huene named several dubious Tanystropheus species from Germany and Poland. T. posthumus, from the Norian of Germany, was later reevaluated as an indeterminate theropod vertebra and a nomen dubium. Several more von Huene species, including "Procerosaurus cruralis", "Thecodontosaurus latespinatus", and "Thecodontosaurus primus", have been reconsidered as indeterminate material of Tanystropheus or other archosauromorphs.

One of Von Huene's species appears to be valid: T. antiquus, from the Gogolin Formation of Poland, was based on cervical vertebrae which were proportionally shorter than those of other Tanystropheus species. Long considered destroyed in World War II, several T. antiquus fossils were rediscovered in the late 2010s. The proportions of T. antiquus fossils are easily distinguishable, and it is currently considered a valid species of archosauromorph. However, its referral to the genus Tanystropheus has been questioned, and recent studies have frequently assigned it to a separate genus Protanystropheus. The Gogolin Formation ranges from the upper Olenekian (latest part of the Early Triassic) to the lower Anisian in age. Specimens likely referable to T. antiquus are also known from throughout Germany and the fossiliferous Winterswijk site in the Netherlands.

=== Monte San Giorgio species ===
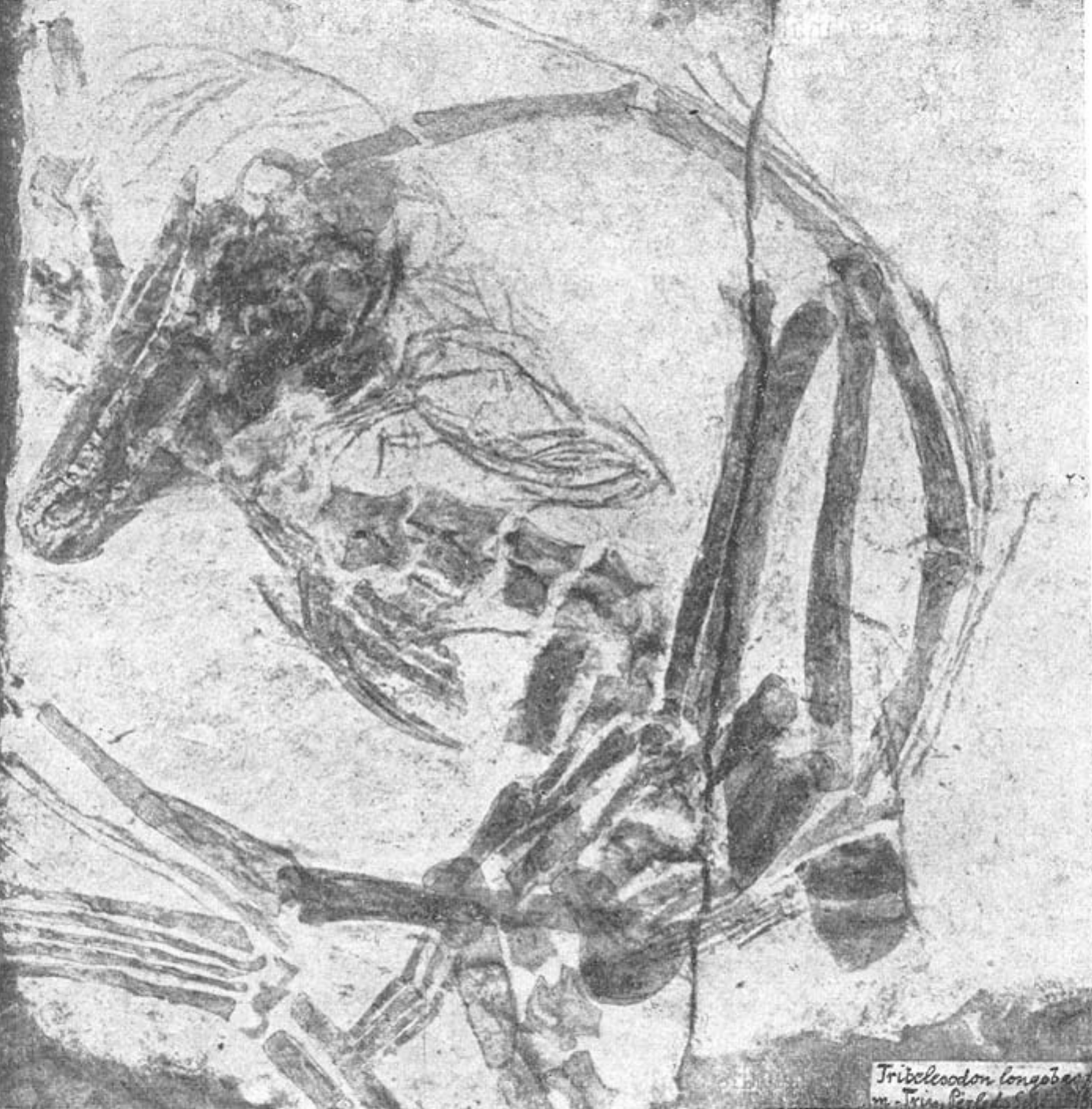
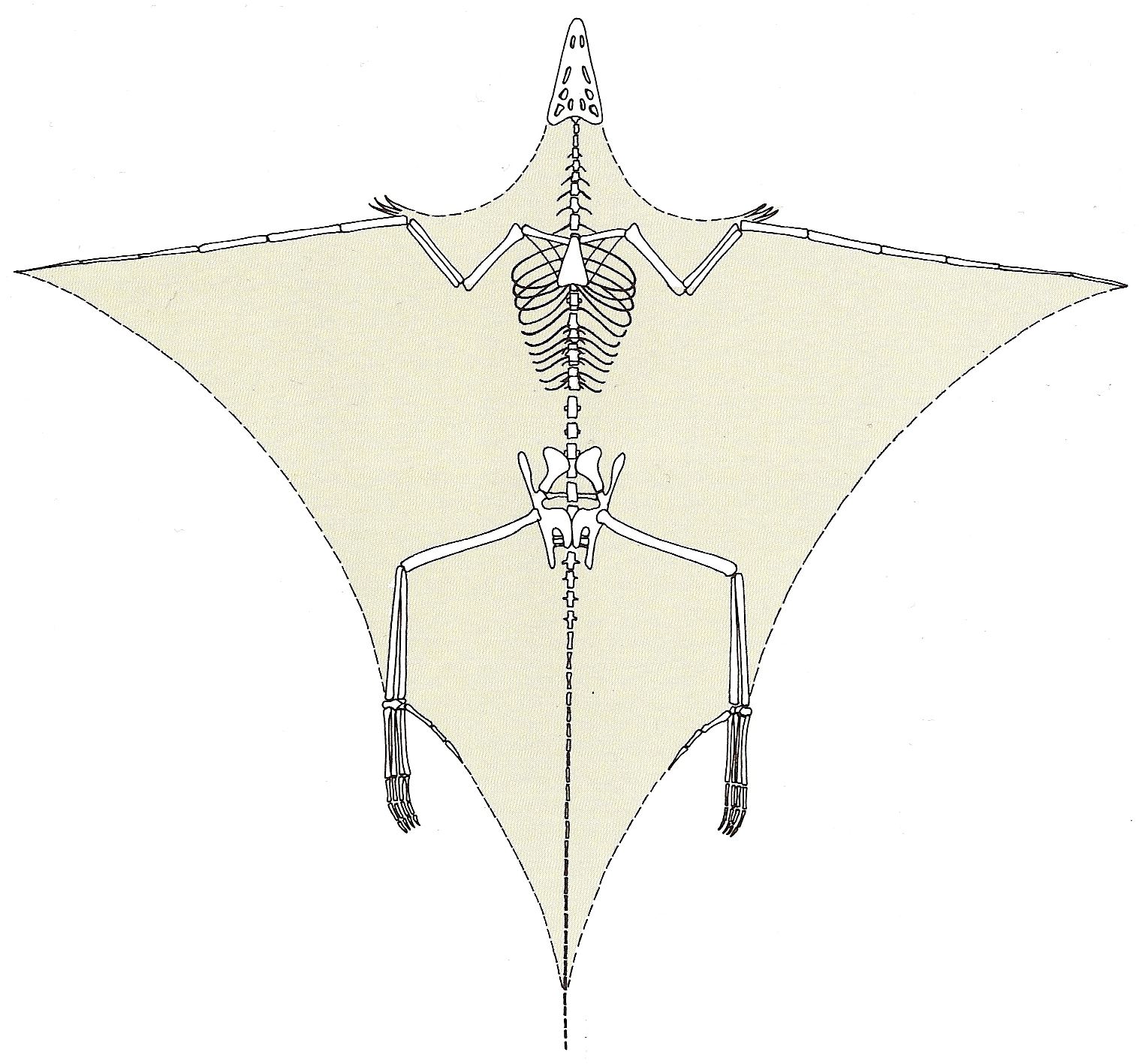
The destroyed holotype of Tanystropheus longobardicus, misinterpreted as a long-tailed pterosaur ("Tribelesodon") until the late 1920s. Fossil (left) and 1923 restoration by Franz Nopcsa (right).

19th century excavations at Monte San Giorgio, a UNESCO world heritage site on the Italy-Switzerland border, revealed a fragmentary fossil of an animal with three-cusped (tricuspid) teeth and elongated bones. Monte San Giorgio preserves the Besano Formation (also known as the Grenzbitumenzone), a late Anisian-early Ladinian lagerstätte recognised for its spectacular fossils. In 1886, Francesco Bassani interpreted the unusual tricuspid fossil as a pterosaur, which he named Tribelesodon longobardicus. The holotype specimen of Tribelesodon longobardicus was stored in the Museo Civico di Storia Naturale di Milano (Natural History Museum of Milan), and was destroyed by allied bombing of Milan in World War II.

Excavations by University of Zürich paleontologist Bernhard Peyer in the late 1920s and 1930s revealed many more complete fossils of the species from Monte San Giorgio. Peyer's discoveries allowed Tribelesodon longobardicus to be recognised as a non-flying reptile, more than 40 years after its original description. Its supposed elongated finger bones were recognized as neck vertebrae, which compared favorably with those previously described as Tanystropheus from Germany and Poland. Thus, Tribelesodon longobardicus was renamed to Tanystropheus longobardicus and its anatomy was revised into a long-necked, non-pterosaur reptile. Specimen PIMUZ T 2791, which was discovered in 1929, has been designated as the neotype of the species.

Well-preserved T. longobardicus fossils continue to be recovered from Monte San Giorgio up to the present day. Fossils from the mountain are primarily stored at the rebuilt Museo Civico di Storia Naturale di Milano (MSNM), the Paleontological Museum of Zürich (PIMUZ), and the Museo Cantonale di Scienze Naturali di Lugano (MCSN). Rupert Wild reviewed and redescribed all specimens known at the time via several large monographs in 1973/4 and 1980. In 2005, Silvio Renesto described a T. longobardicus specimen from Switzerland which preserved the impressions of skin and other soft tissue. Five new MSNM specimens of T. longobardicus were described by Stefania Nosotti in 2007, allowing for a more comprehensive view of the species' anatomy.

A small but well-preserved skull and neck, specimen PIMUZ T 3901, was found in the slightly younger Meride Limestone at Monte San Giorgio. Wild (1980) gave it a new species, T. meridensis, based on a set of skull and vertebral traits proposed to differ from T. longobardicus. Later reinvestigations failed to confirm the validity of these differences, rendering T. meridensis a junior synonym of T. longobardicus. A 2019 revision of Tanystropheus concluded that T. longobardicus and T. antiquus were the only valid species in the genus, though this conclusion would prove to be short-lived.

Tanystropheus specimens from Monte San Giorgio have long been segregated into two morphotypes based on their tooth structure. Smaller specimens bear tricuspid teeth at the back of the jaw while larger specimens have a set of single-pointed fangs. The two morphotypes were originally considered to represent juvenile and adult specimens of T. longobardicus, though many studies have supported the hypothesis that they represent separate species. A 2020 study found numerous differences between the skulls of large and small specimens, formalizing the proposal to divide the two into separate species. Moreover, a histological investigation revealed that one small specimen, PIMUZ T 1277, was a skeletally mature adult at a length of only 1.5 m (4 ft 11 in). The larger one-cusped morphotype was named as a new species, Tanystropheus hydroides (referencing the Hydra of Greek mythology), while the smaller tricuspid morphotype retains the name T. longobardicus.

=== Fossils in China ===
The most well-preserved Tanystropheus fossils outside of Monte San Giorgio come from the Guizhou province of China, as described by Li (2007) and Rieppel (2010). They are also among the youngest and easternmost fossils in the genus, hailing from the upper Ladinian or lower Carnian Zhuganpo Formation. Although the postcrania is complete and indistinguishable from the fossils of Monte San Giorgio, no skull material is preserved, and their younger age precludes unambiguous placement into any Tanystropheus species. The Chinese material includes a large morphotype (T. hydroides?) specimen, GMPKU-P-1527, and an indeterminate juvenile skeleton, IVPP V 14472.

=== Fossils in North America ===
In the 1880s, E.D. Cope named three supposed new Tanystropheus species (T. bauri, T. willistoni, and T. longicollis) from the Late Triassic Chinle Formation in New Mexico. However, these fossils were later determined to be tail vertebrae belonging to theropod dinosaurs, which were named under the new genus Coelophysis.

In 2015, a large Tanystropheus cervical vertebra was described from the Economy Member of the Wolfville Formation, in the Bay of Fundy of Nova Scotia, Canada. The Wolfville Formation spans the Anisian to Carnian stages, and the Economy Member is likely Middle Triassic (Anisian-Ladinian) in age. It is a rare example of predominantly freshwater strata preserving Tanystropheus fossils. The Nova Scotian fossil has stronger rib facets than other Tanystropheus remains, and it may possibly represent a different taxon. Tanystropheus-like tanystropheid fossils are known from another freshwater formation in North America: the Anisian-age Moenkopi Formation of Arizona and New Mexico.

Small freshwater tanystropheids are known from Petrified Forest National Park (PEFO) in Arizona, including thin cervical vertebrae similar to Tanystropheus, though much smaller. The park's largest Tanystropheus-like cervical is a mere 3.7 centimetres (1.5 in) long. First reported in 2025, The PEFO remains are from the Upper Blue Mesa Member of the Chinle Formation, which is dated to the Norian stage, between 223 and 218 million years ago. If they legitimately belong to Tanystropheus, they would indicate that the genus survived in an inland environment at least 14 million years beyond its assumed extinction elsewhere.

=== Other fossils ===
Authentic Tanystropheus specimens from the Makhtesh Ramon in Israel were described as a new species, T. haasi, in 2001. However, this species may be dubious due to the difficulty of distinguishing its vertebrae from T. conspicuus or T. longobardicus. Another new species, T. biharicus, was described from Romania in 1975. It has also been considered possibly synonymous with T. longobardicus. A Tanystropheus-like vertebra from the middle Ladinian Erfurt Formation (Lettenkeuper) of Germany was described in 1846 as one of several fossils gathered under the name "Zanclodon laevis". Though likely the first Tanystropheus fossil to be discovered, the vertebra is now lost, and surviving jaw fragments and other fossil scraps of "Zanclodon laevis" represent indeterminate archosauriforms with no relation to Tanystropheus.

Indeterminate Tanystropheus remains are also known from the Jilh Formation of Saudi Arabia, various Anisian-Ladinian sites in Spain, France, Italy, Switzerland, and the Villány Mountains of Hungary. The youngest Tanystropheus fossil in Europe is a vertebra from the lower Carnian Fusea site in Friuli, Italy.

Several new tanystropheid genera have been named from former Tanystropheus fossils. Fossils from the Anisian Röt Formation in Germany, previously referred to Tanystropheus antiquus, were named as a new genus and species in 2006: Amotosaurus rotfeldensis. In 2011, fossils from the Lipovskaya Formation of Russia were given the new genus and species Augustaburiania vatagini by A.G. Sennikov. He also named the new genus Protanystropheus for T. antiquus, though a few studies continued to retain that species within Tanystropheus. Tanystropheus fossai, from the Norian-age Argillite di Riva di Solto in Italy, was given its own genus Sclerostropheus in 2019.

== Anatomy ==
Size comparison between T. conspicuus, T. hydroides (PIMUZ T 2793), and T. longobardicus (MSNM V 3730)

Tanystropheus was one of the longest known non-archosauriform archosauromorphs. Vertebrae referred to T. conspicuus may correspond to an animal up to five or six meters (16.4 to 20 feet) in length. T. hydroides was around the same size, with the largest specimens at an estimated length of 5.25 meters (17.2 feet). T. longobardicus was significantly smaller, with an absolute maximum size of two meters (6.6 feet). Despite the large size of some Tanystropheus species, the animal was lightly built. One mass estimate used crocodiles as a density guideline for a 3.6 meter (11.8 feet)-long model of a Tanystropheus skeleton. For a Tanystropheus individual of that length, the weight estimate varied between 32.9 kg (72.5 lbs) and 74.8 kg (164.9 lbs), depending on the volume estimation method. This was significantly lighter than crocodiles of the same length, and more similar to large lizards.

=== Skull of Tanystropheus longobardicus ===
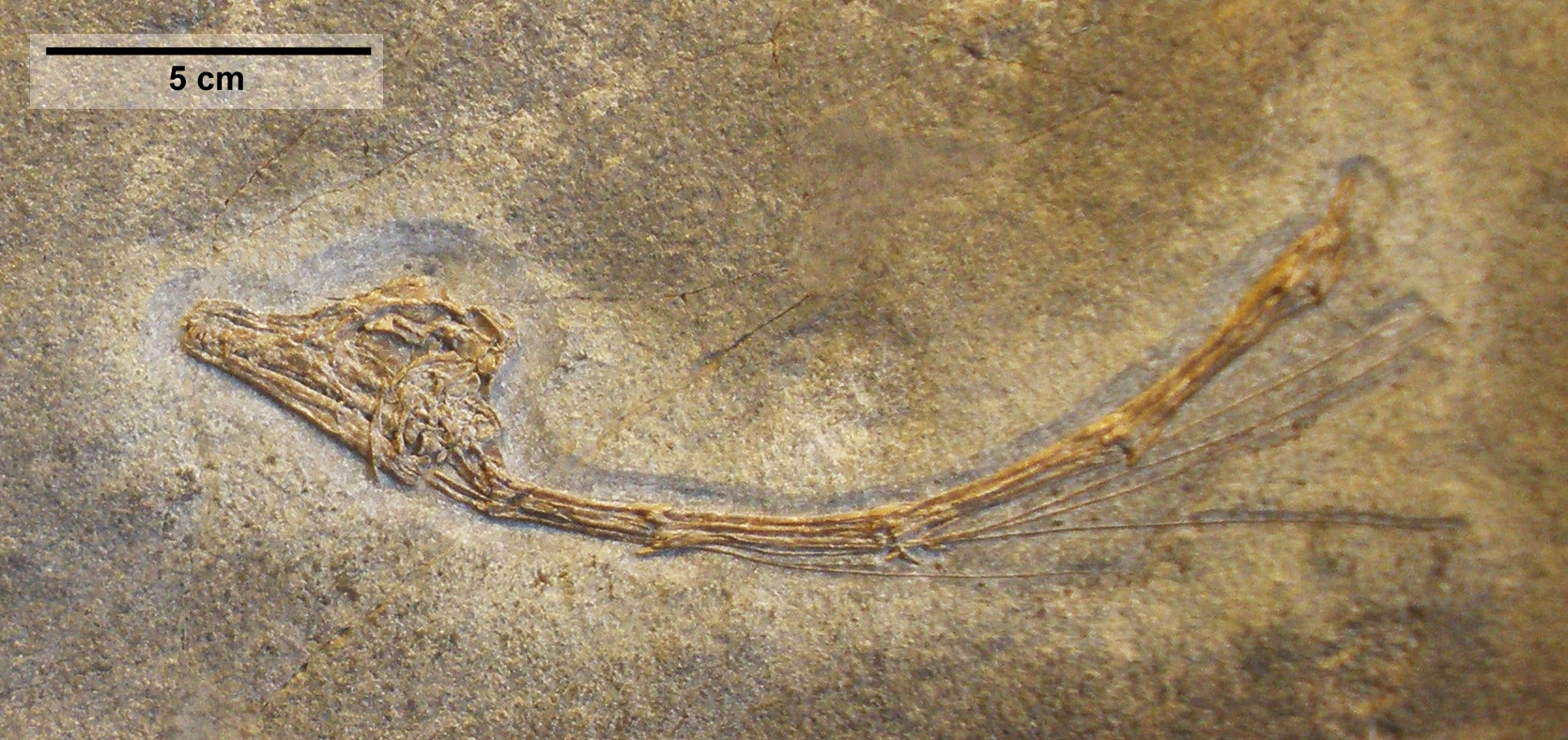
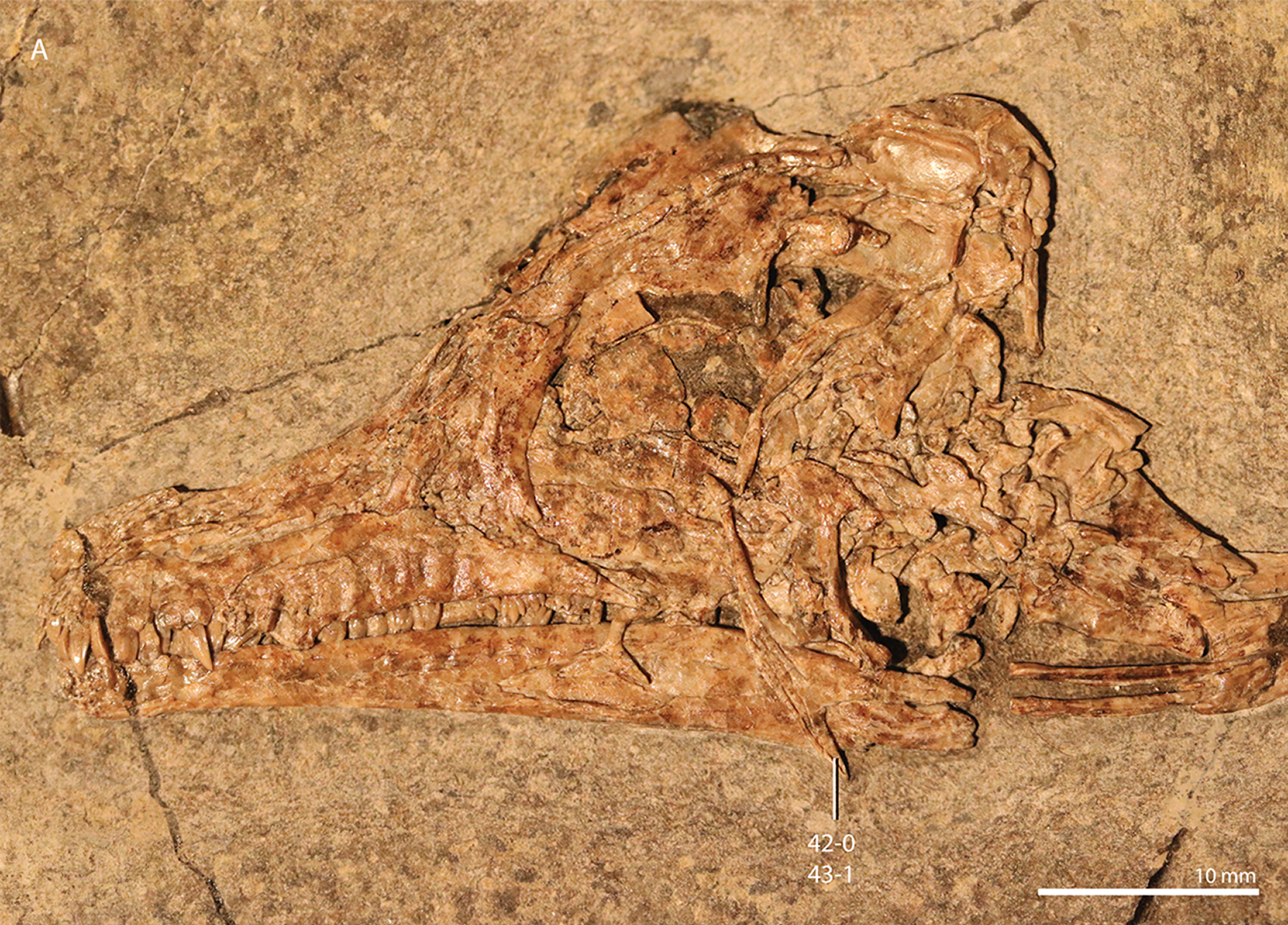
PIMUZ T 3901, a specimen of Tanystropheus longobardicus formerly described as "Tanystropheus meridensis". Skull and partial neck (top) and a closer view of the skull (bottom).

The skull of Tanystropheus longobardicus is roughly triangular when seen from the side and top, narrowing towards the snout. Each premaxilla (the toothed bone at the tip of the snout) has a long tooth row, with six teeth. The premaxillary teeth are conical, fluted by longitudinal ridges, and have subthecodont implantation, meaning that the inner wall of each tooth socket is lower than the outer wall. The premaxilla meets the maxilla (the succeeding toothed bone) along a long, slanted contact. This shape is produced by an elongated postnarial process (rear prong) of the premaxilla, which extends below and behind the nares (nostril holes). The nasals (bones at the top edge of the snout) are poorly known, but were likely narrow and flat. A 2020 reinvestigation revealed that the front part of the nasals and the inner spur of the premaxillae are too short to keep the nares divided. This leaves a single central narial opening for the nostrils, opening upwards. An undivided naris is seen in few other archosauromorphs, namely rhynchosaurs, most allokotosaurs, modern crocodilians, and Teyujagua.

The maxilla is triangular, reaching its maximum height at mid-length and tapering to the front and rear. There are up to 14 or 15 teeth in the maxilla, though some individuals have fewer. T. longobardicus is a reptile with heterodont dentition, meaning that it had more than one type of tooth shape. In contrast to the simple fang-like premaxillary teeth, most or all of the maxillary teeth have a distinctive tricuspid shape, with the crown split into three stout triangular cusps (points). The cusps are arranged in a line from front-to-back, with the central cusp larger than the other two cusps. Among Triassic reptiles, early pterosaurs such as Eudimorphodon developed an equivalent tooth shape, and tricuspid teeth can also be found in a few modern lizard species. Some individuals of T. longobardicus have tricuspid teeth along their entire maxilla, while in others up to seven maxillary teeth are single-cusped fangs similar to the premaxillary teeth.

The front edge of each orbit (eye socket) is marked by two bones: the prefrontal and lacrimal. The prefrontal is tall and projects a low vertical ridge in front of the orbit. The small, sliver-shaped lacrimal is nestled further down along the maxilla. An enlarged duct on the lacrimal may have held a salt gland. The lower edge of the orbit is formed by the jugal, a bone with a slender anterior process (front branch) and a somewhat broader dorsal process (upper branch). There is also a very short pointed posterior process (rear branch) which ends freely and fails to contact any other bone. The shape of the jugal in Tanystropheus is typical for early archosauromorphs; the underdeveloped posterior process indicates that the margin of the infratemporal fenestra (lower skull hole behind the eye) was incomplete and open from below. The postorbital bone, which links the jugal to the top of the skull, was tall and roughly boomerang-shaped, though poor preservation obscures some details. The squamosal bone, which extends behind the postorbital, is also poorly known in T. longobardicus, and many supposed squamosal fossils in the species have been reinterpreted as displaced postorbitals. The quadrate bone, which forms the rear edge of the skull and upper half of the jaw joint, is wide and tall. It has a strong lateral crest and a low pterygoid ramus (a vertical internal plate, articulating with the pterygoid bone in the roof of the mouth). No fossils of T. longobardicus preserve a quadratojugal, a bone which normally lies along the quadrate at the rear lower corner of the skull. Nevertheless, a quadratojugal was likely present in the species, since it occurs in T. hydroides and nearly every other early archosauromorph.

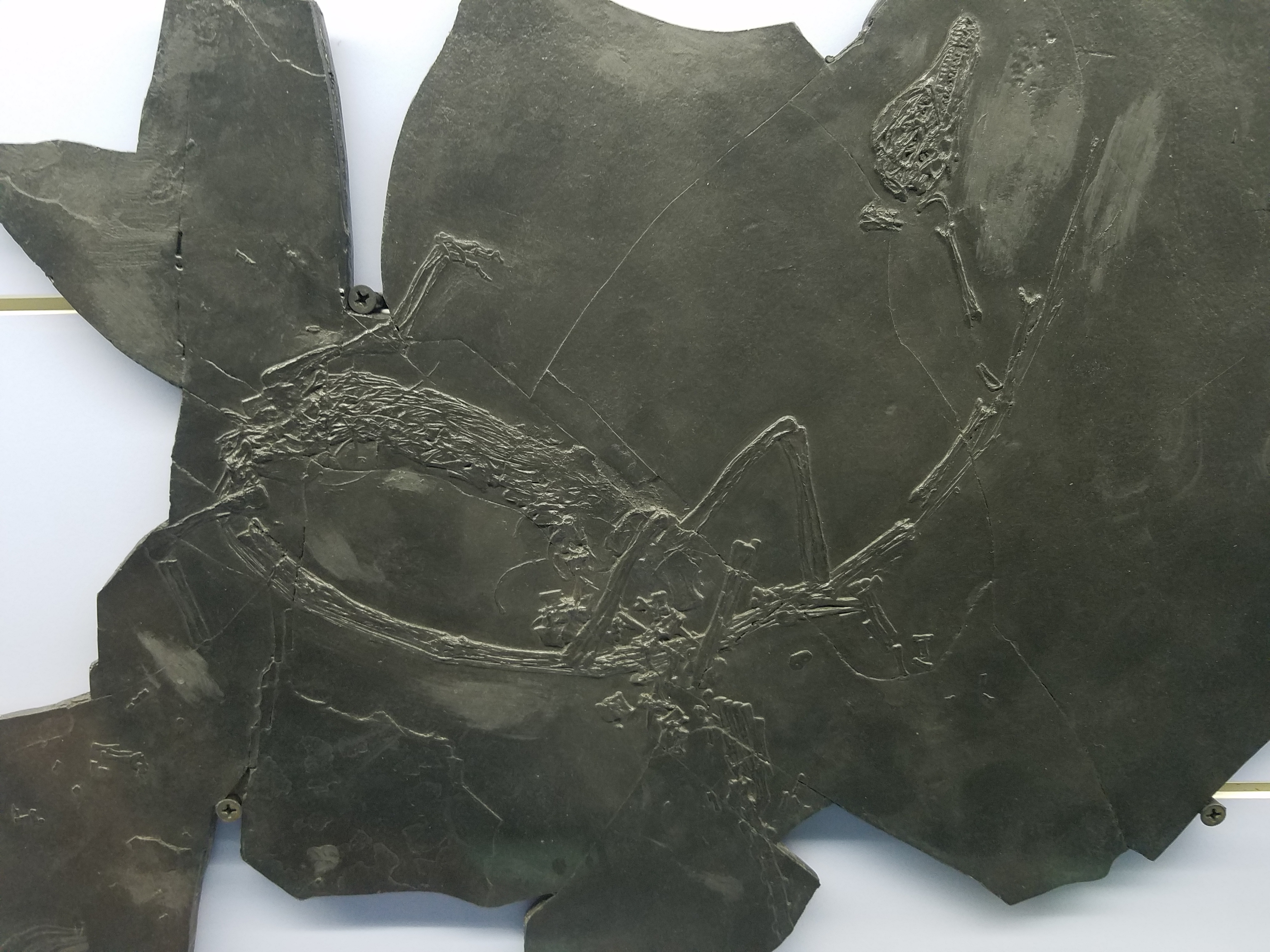
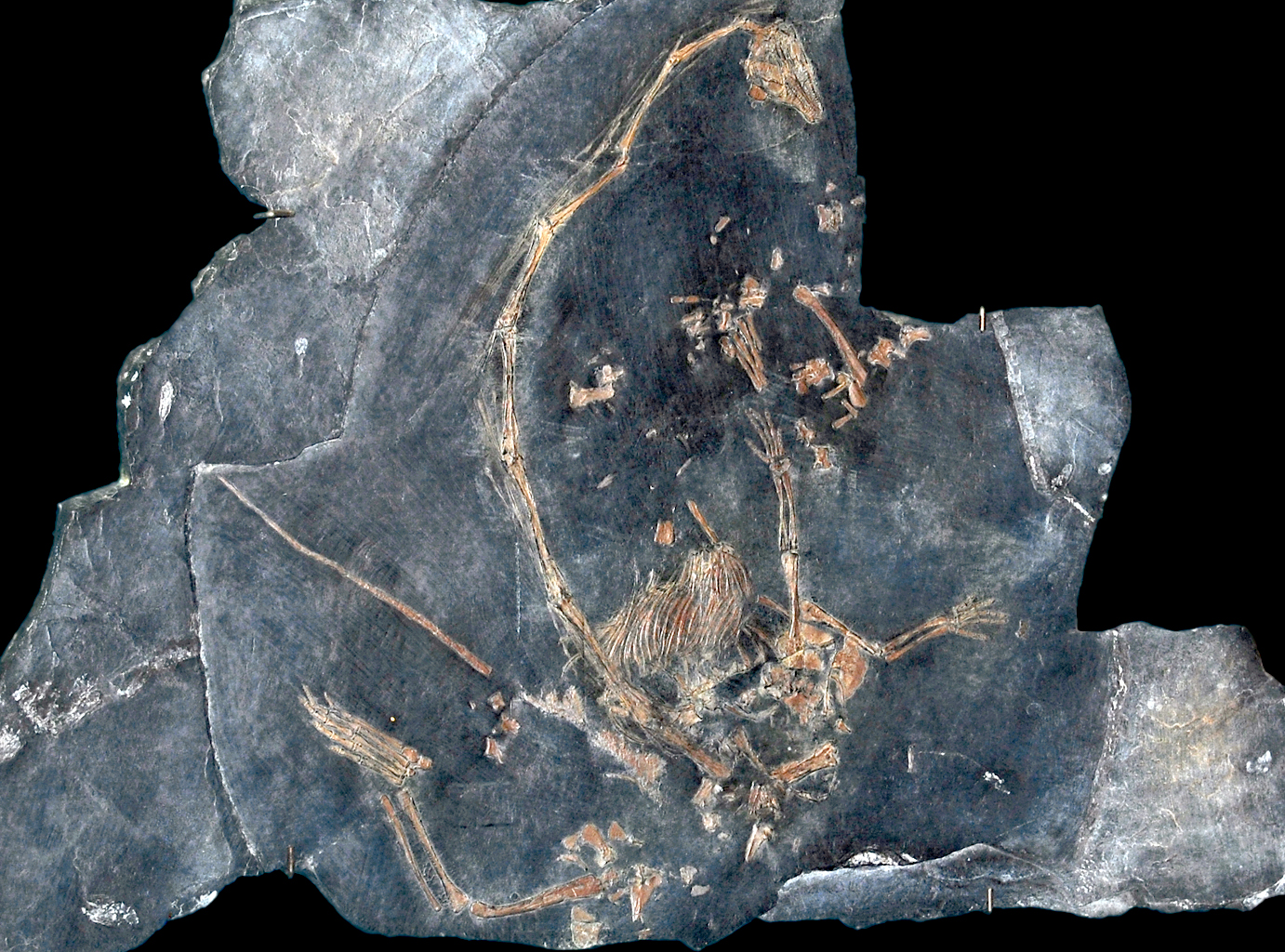
Casts of complete skeletons of Tanystropheus longobardicus preserving skulls: the neotype PIMUZ T 2791 (top) and MSNM BES SC 1018 (bottom).

The paired frontals (skull roof bones above the orbits) have been described as "axe-shaped flanges", projecting broad curved plates above each orbit. Together, the frontals are narrowest at the front, terminating at a three-lobed contact with the nasals. The sutures between the frontals and their neighboring bones are coarse and interdigitating (interlocking). A small triangular bone, the postfrontal, wedges behind the rear outer corner of each frontal. A pair of larger plate-like bones, the parietals, sit directly behind the frontals on the skull roof. In T. longobardicus, the parietals are fairly broad and flat, with a shallowly concave outer edge. Like the frontals, the paired parietals are seemingly separate bones, unfused to each other in every member of the species. A large hole, the pineal foramen (sometimes called the parietal foramen), is present at the midline of the skull between the front part of each parietal. When seen from below, a pair of curved crests along the frontals and parietals mark the edge of the forebrain, as defined by a bulbous central hollow.

The eye was supported by more than 10 rectangular ossicles (tiny plate-like bones) connecting into a scleral ring, though a full reconstruction of the ring, with 18 ossicles, is conjectural. Few details of the braincase and palate (bony roof of the mouth) are known for T. longobardicus. The scant available evidence suggests that these regions of the skull are rather unspecialized in this species. The vomers (front components of the palate) are narrow and dotted with at least nine tiny teeth. The succeeding palatine and pterygoid bones are also supplied with rows of teeth: up to six relatively large teeth in the former and at least 12 small teeth in the latter. Teeth on the vomers, palatines, and pterygoids are the norm for early archosauromorphs and reptiles as a whole.

The lower jaw is slender, and most of its length is devoted to the toothed dentary bone. The dentary is downturned at its tip and its outer surface is dotted with a row of prominent foramina (blood vessel pits). There are up to 19 teeth in the dentary. Most commonly, the first six teeth are prominent conical fangs, akin to the premaxilla, while the remainder are small and tricuspid, akin to the maxilla. There is some variation in the number of each tooth shape, and some individuals may have up to 11 conical teeth. The inner surface of the dentary is joined by a splint-shaped bone, the splenial, at its lower edge. The splenial was most likely not visible in lateral view. At its rear, the dentary seems to be partially overlapped by the surangular, a bone which comprises much of the rear part of the jaw. Although it is plausible that a small coronoid bone could be present in front of the surangular, evidence is ambiguous at best for all Tanystropheus species. A sheathe-like bone, the angular, is well-exposed under the dentary and surangular, though sutures between these bones are difficult to interpret with certainty. The joint at the back of the jaw lies on the articular, a lumpy rectangular bone which is floored and reinforced by a similar bone: the prearticular. In Tanystropheus species with known skull material, both the articular and prearticular contribute equally to a segment of the jaw extending back beyond the level of the jaw joint. This projection, known as a retroarticular process, is enlarged to a similar degree to that of early rhynchosaurs.

=== Skull of Tanystropheus hydroides ===
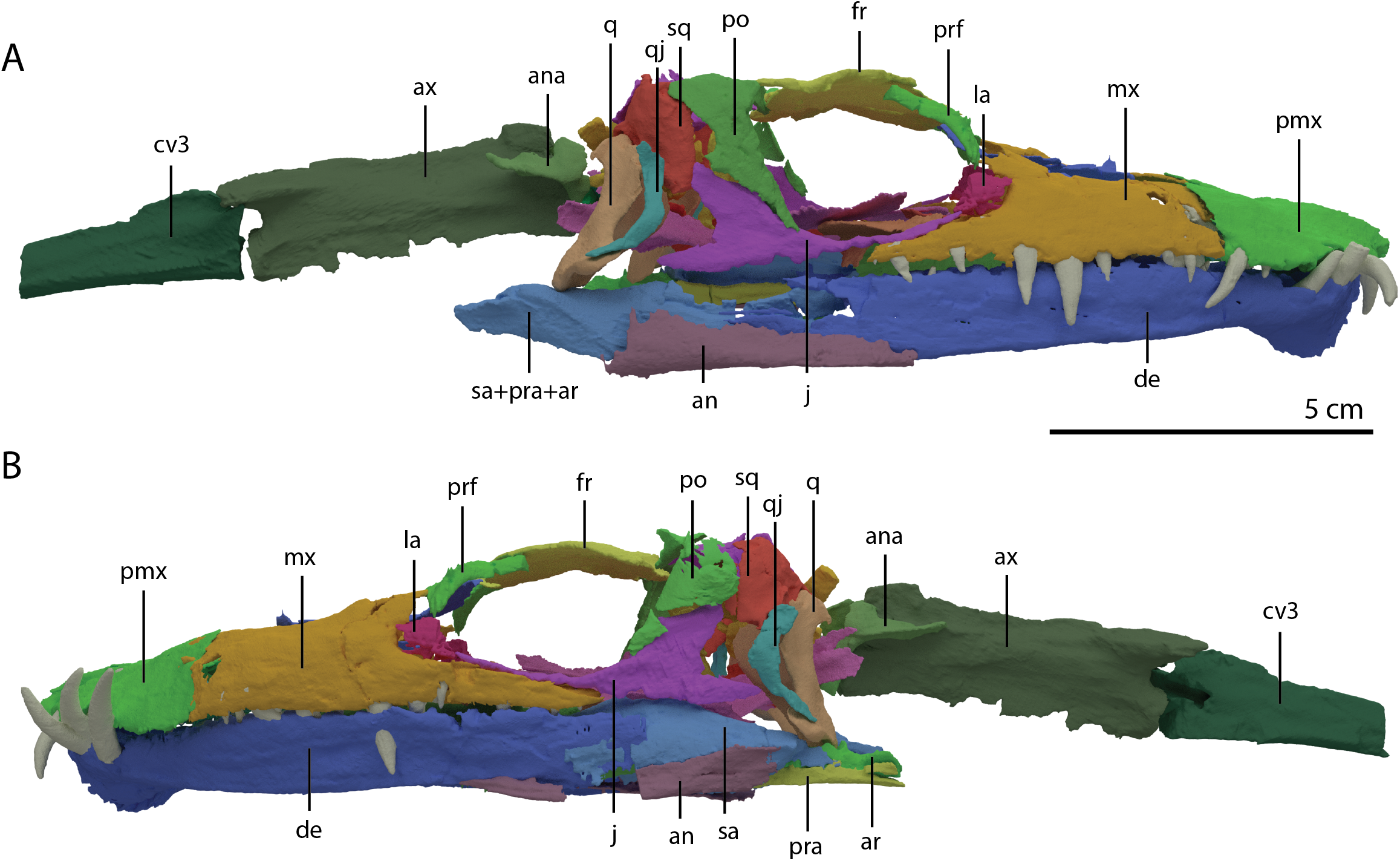
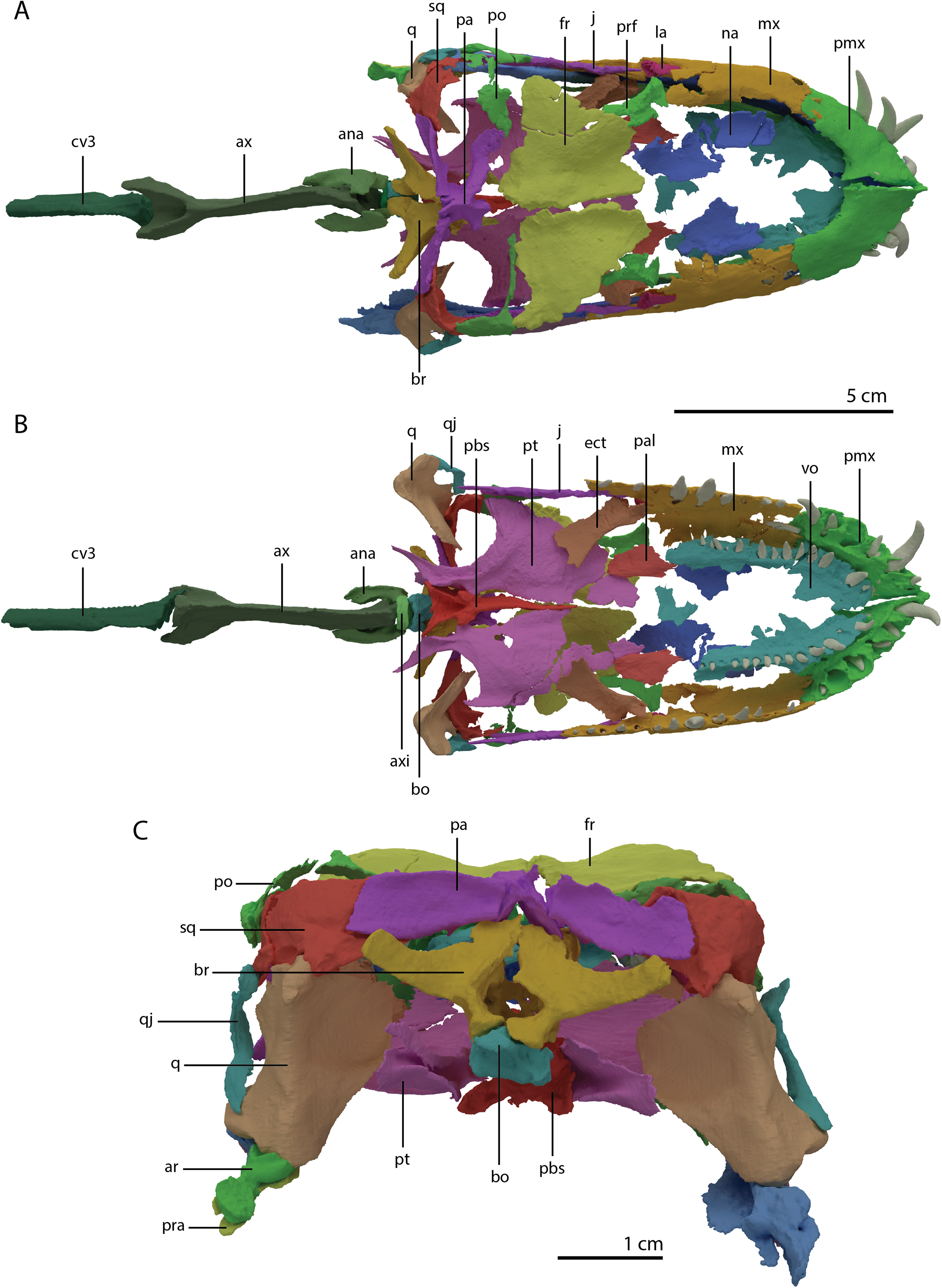
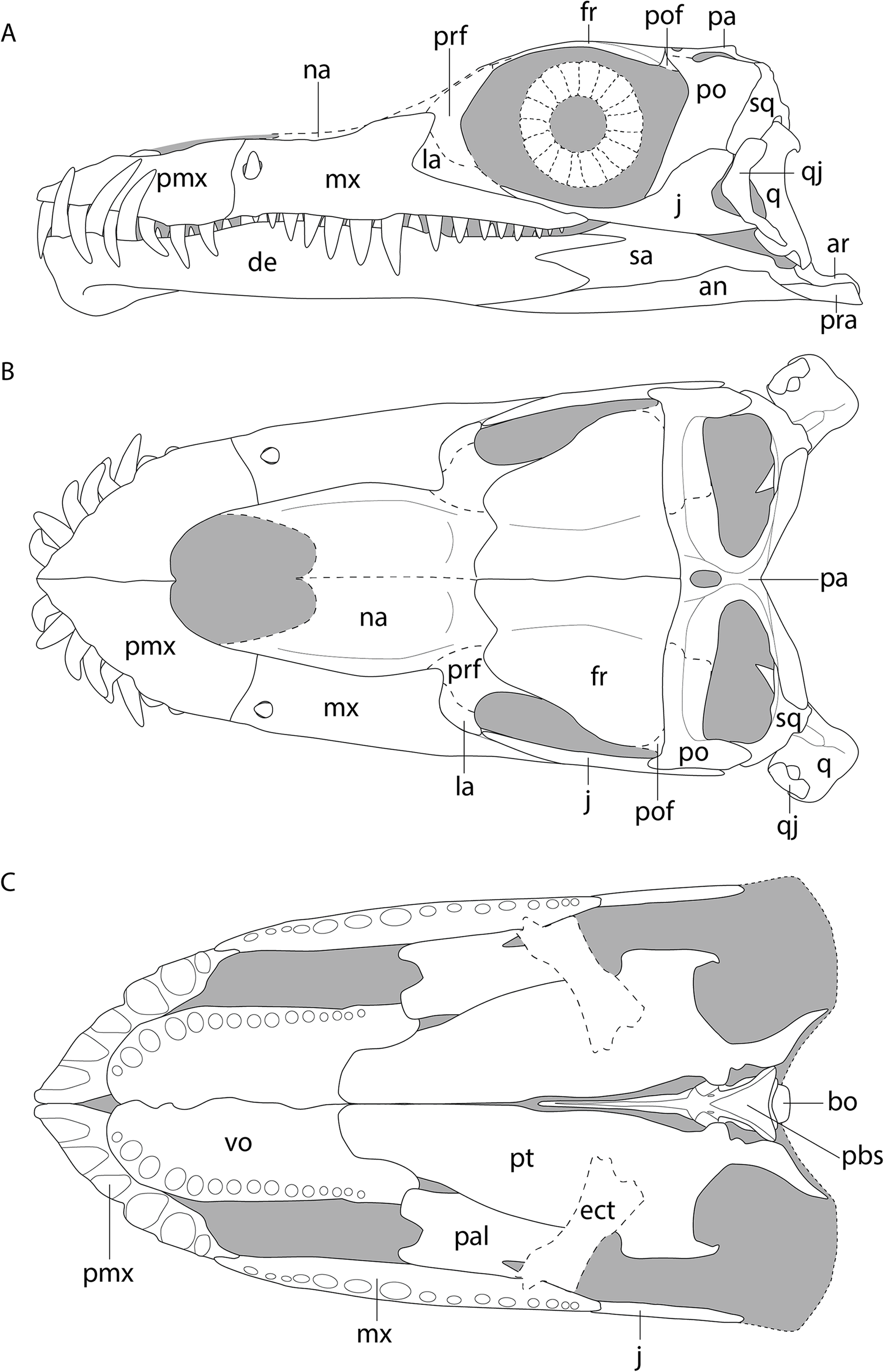
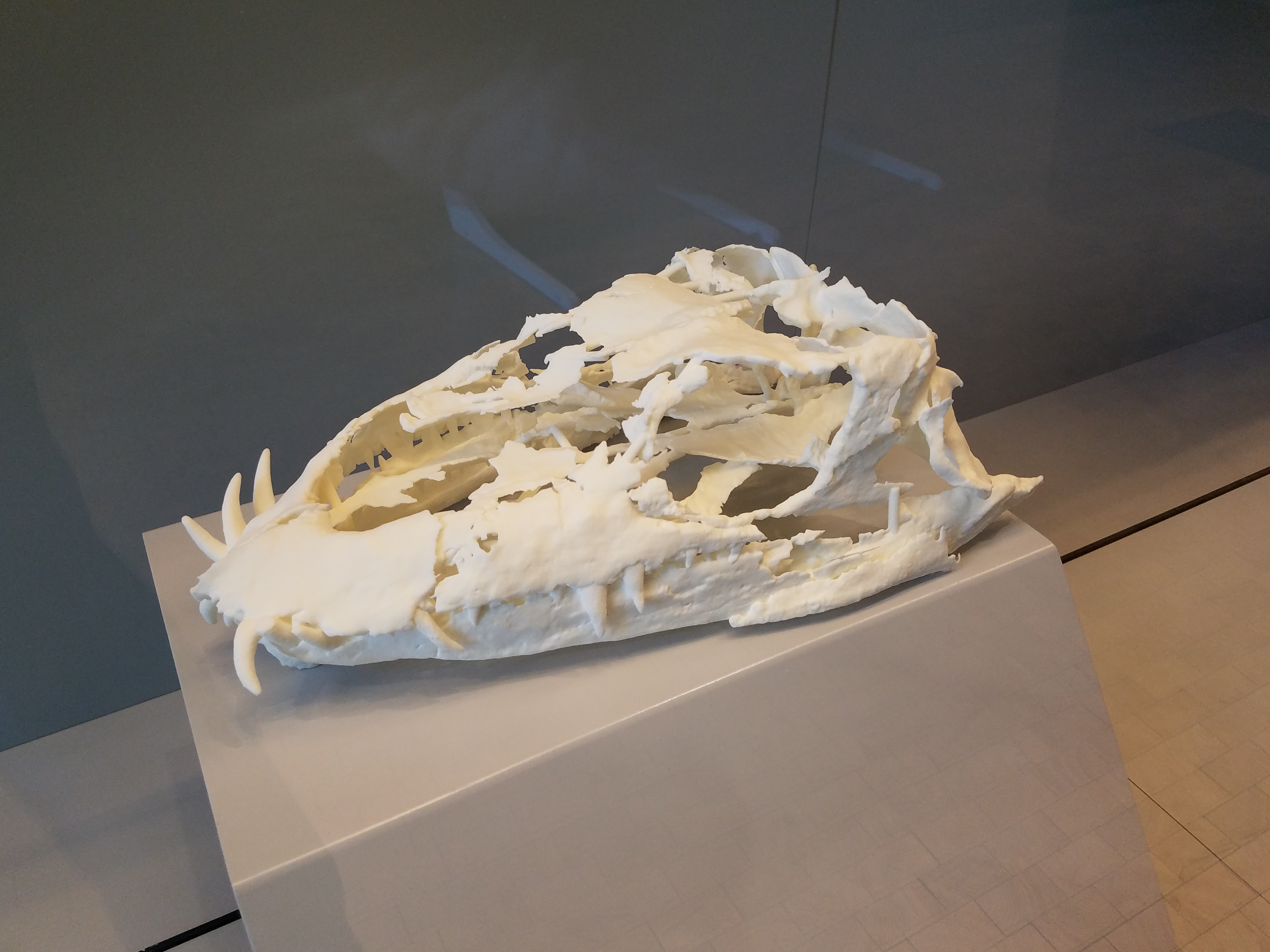
The skull of PIMUZ T 2790, the holotype of Tanystropheus hydroides. Digital reconstruction in lateral views (top); dorsal, ventral, and occipital views (left middle); line diagram in left lateral, dorsal, and ventral views (right middle); 3D printed model (bottom).

The skull of Tanystropheus hydroides is broader and flatter than that of T. longobardicus. The first five of six teeth in the premaxilla are very large and fang-like, forming an interlocking "fish trap" similar to Dinocephalosaurus and many sauropterygians such as plesiosaurs and nothosaurs. All teeth in the skull have a single cusp which is sharp, curved, and unserrated. They have an oval-shaped cross section and shallow subthecodont implantation. Like T. longobardicus, T. hydroides has a single central narial opening. Unlike T. longobardicus, T. hydroides has a nearly vertical rear edge of the premaxilla, without a postnarial process. The maxilla is low, with a large and rectangular front portion. There is a perforation near the front of the bone, which would have been penetrated by the tenth dentary tooth when the mouth was closed. Towards the rear, the maxilla develops a concave edge overlooking a long and slender posterior process (rear branch) that projects under the rounded orbit. There are 15 teeth in the maxilla, increasing in size up to the eighth tooth, which is about as large as the premaxillary fangs. T.hydroides is not known to possess a septomaxilla, a bone at the rear tip of the naris in some reptiles. The nasals are broad and plate-like, with a depressed central portion. The lacrimal and prefrontal, though incompletely known, were likely similar to those of T. longobardicus. T. hydroides has a particularly large nasolacrimal duct, a tubular channel opening out of the rear of the lacrimal. The frontals are quite wide and form much of the upper edge of the orbit, a condition akin to T. longobardicus. However, the paired frontals meet along a straight suture with a low ridge on the lower (internal) surface, in contrast to T. longobardicus, where the frontals meet at an interdigitating suture with a broad furrow on the underside.

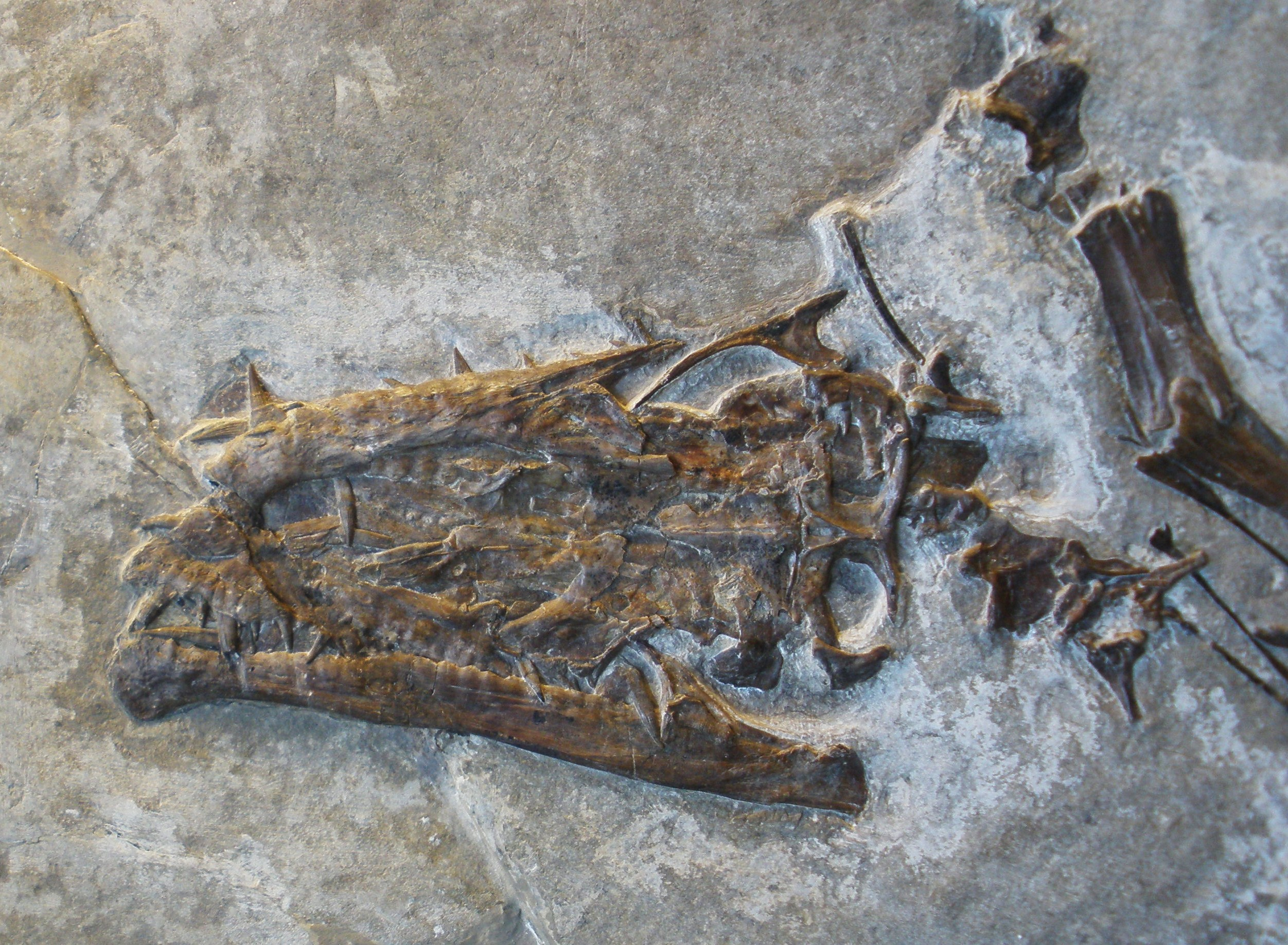
The flattened single-cusped skull of PIMUZ T 2819, a large morphotype (T. hydroides) specimen

The parietals are strongly modified in T. hydroides. They are fused into a single X-shaped bone, somewhat resembling the parietals of erythrosuchids. This shape may have resulted from fusion between the parietals' anterolateral processes (front branches) and the postfrontals, which are separate bones in T. longobardicus but not apparent in T. hydroides. A prominent pineal foramen is positioned near the straight contact with the frontals, one of the few similarities with T. longobardicus. Strong supratemporal fossae excavate into the outer edge of the parietal and define a low sagittal crest along the midline of the skull. This trend is shared with other large archosauromorphs, like Dinocephalosaurus and Azendohsaurus. The supratemporal fenestrae (upper skull holes behind the eye) are wide and semi-triangular, exposed almost entirely from above. The postorbital has large and blocky ventral and medial processes (lower and inward branches), which meet at a sharper angle than in any other early archosauromorph. The jugal, conversely, is basically indistinguishable from that of T. longobardicus. The squamosal is deep and rectangular when viewed from the side, with little differentiation between the tall suture with the postorbital and the small suture with the quadratojugal. As a result, most of the posterior skull is clustered together, and the infratemporal fenestra is reduced to a small diagonal hole. The quadratojugal is a curved sliver of bone which twists back alongside the quadrate. Relative to T. longobardicus, the quadrate has a larger pterygoid ramus and a strongly hooked projection at its upper extent.

The palate of T. hydroides has several unique traits. The vomers are wide and tongue-shaped, each hosting a single row of 15 relatively large curved teeth along the outer edge of the bone, adjacent to the elongated choanae (internal openings of the nasal cavity). Most other archosauromorphs, T. longobardicus included, have restricted vomers with rows of minuscule teeth. The rest of the palate is completely toothless in T. hydroides, even the palatines and pterygoids, which bear tooth rows in most early archosauromorphs. The pterygoids are also unusual for their broad palatal ramus (front plate) and a loose, strongly overlapping connection to the ectopterygoids (linking bones between the pterygoid and maxilla). The epipterygoids (vertical bones in front of the braincase) are tall and flattened from the side.

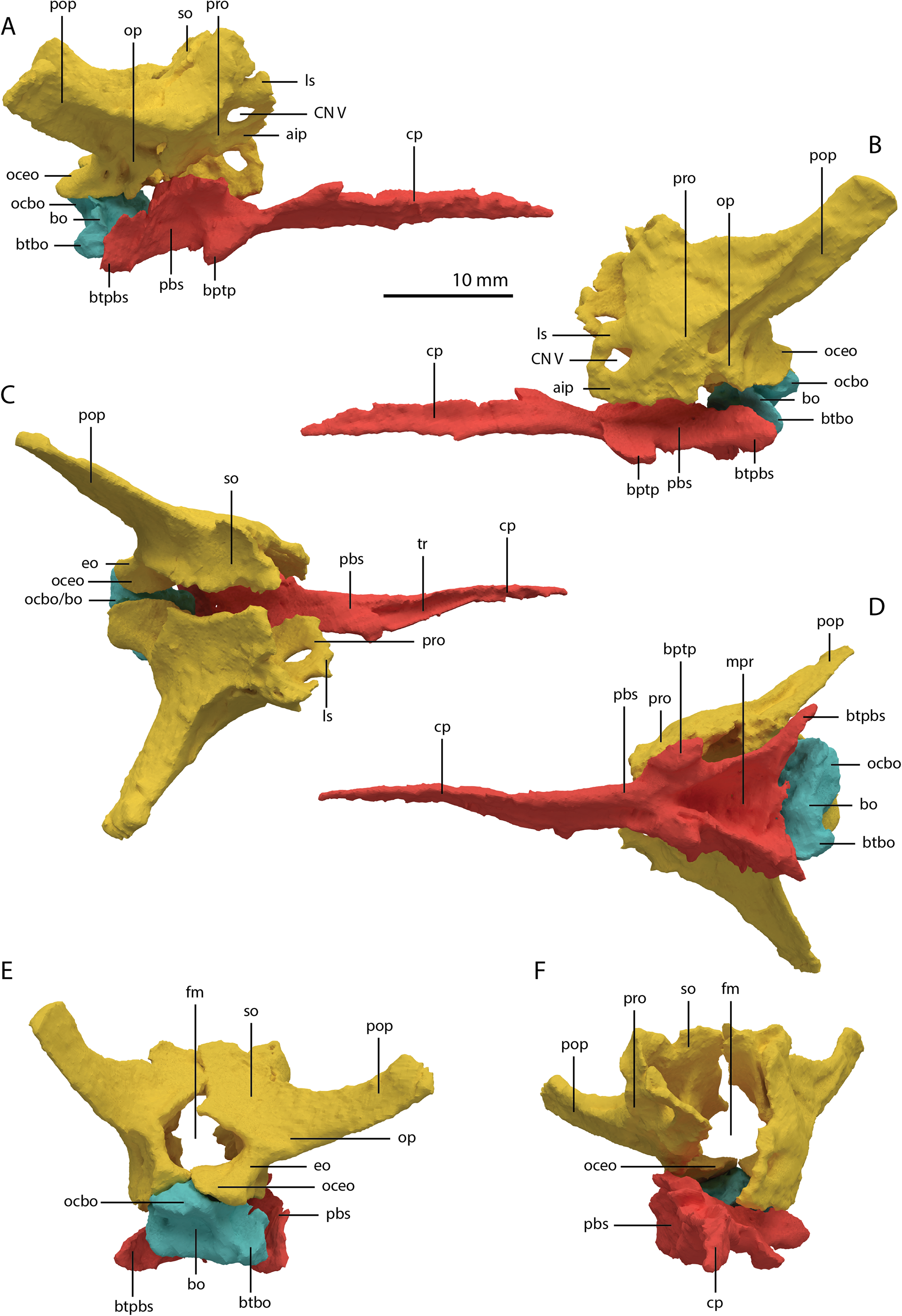
Digital reconstruction of the braincase of PIMUZ T 2790. Basioccipital (blue), parabasisphenoid (red), and composite bone (yellow).

T. hydroides is a rare example of an early archosauromorph with a three-dimensionally preserved braincase. The basioccipital (rear lower component of the braincase) was small, with inset basitubera (vertical plates connecting to neck muscles) linked by a transverse ridge, similar to allokotosaurs and archosauriforms. The parabasisphenoid (front lower component) is less specialized; it lies flat and tapers forwards to a blade-like cultriform process. The rear part of the bone has a deep triangular excavation (known as a median pharyngeal recess) on its underside, flanked by low crests and a pair of small basipterygoid processes (knobs connecting to the pterygoid). The remainder of the braincase is fully fused together into a strongly ossified composite bone, and its constituents must be estimated by comparison to other reptiles. The exoccipitals, which mostly encompass the foramen magnum (spinal cord hole), are perforated with nerve foramina. Each exoccipital merges outwards into the opisthotic, which sends out a straight, elongated paroccipital process (thick outer branch) to the edge of the cranium. In T. longobardicus, the paroccipital processes are shorter and narrower at their base. The stapes, a bone which transmits vibrations from the ear to the braincase, is slender and splits into two small prongs where it contacts the opisthotic. The opisthotic merges forwards into the prootic, which extensively contacts the parabasisphenoid and hosts a range of larger nerve foramina. The prootic forms much of the front edge of the paroccipital process, akin to the condition in archosauriforms. Another archosauriform-like feature is the presence of a laterosphenoid, an additional braincase component in front of the prootic and above the exit hole for the trigeminal nerve (also known as cranial nerve V). The laterosphenoid is small, similar to that of Azendohsaurus. The upper rear part of the braincase is formed by the supraoccipitals, which were presumably fused together as a continuous surface sloping smoothly down to the foramen magnum.

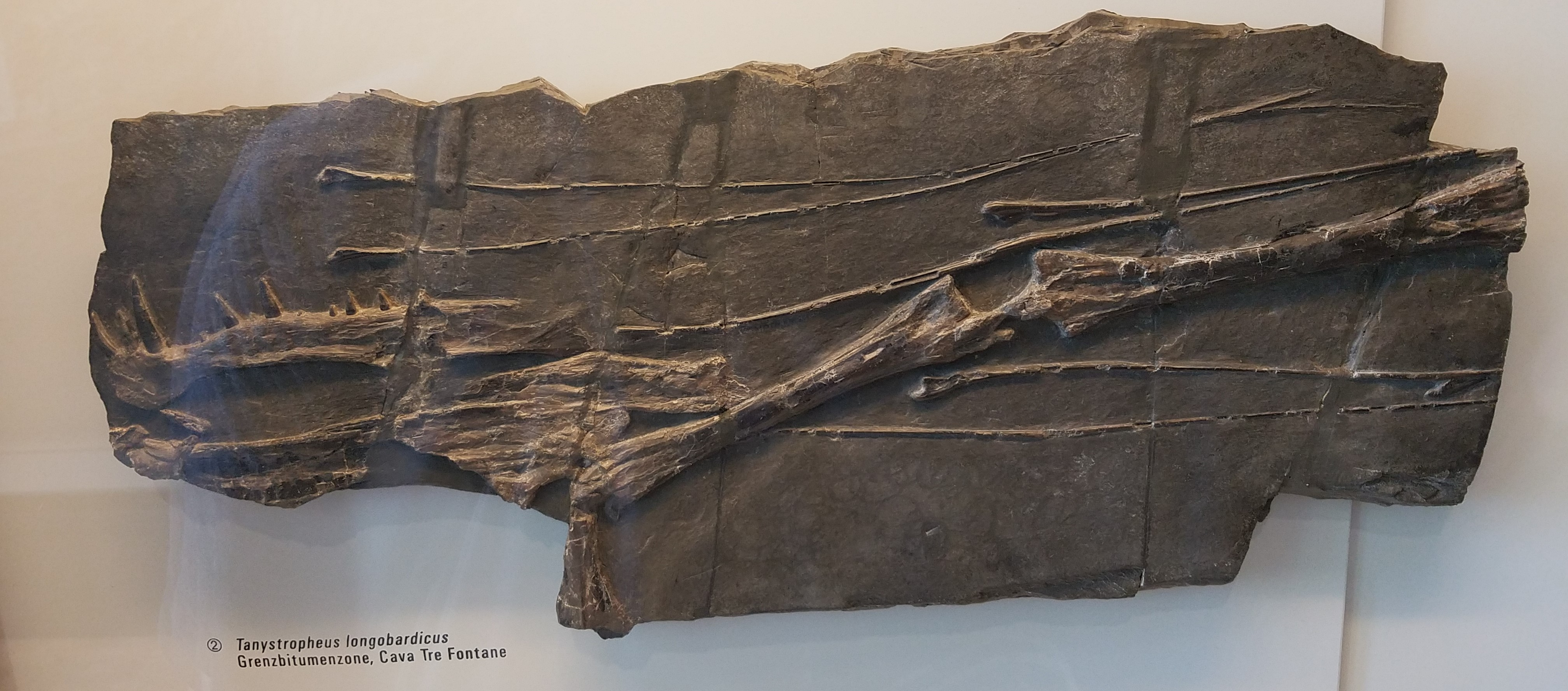
PIMUZ T 2793, a lower jaw and associated vertebrae of T. hydroides

In the lower jaw, the dentaries meet each other at a robust symphysis with an interdigitating suture. The front end of the dentary hosts a prominent keel on its lower edge, a unique trait of the species. There are at least 18 dentary teeth; the first three are by far the largest teeth in the skull, forming the lower half of the interlocking "fish trap" with the premaxilla. Most other teeth in the dentary are small, with the exception of the tenth tooth, which juts up to pierce the maxilla. The remainder of the jaw contains the same set of bones as in T. longobardicus, but some details differ in T. hydroides. For example, the splenial is plate-like and covers a larger portion of the internal dentary than in T. longobardicus. In addition, the rear of the dentary overlaps a large portion of the surangular, rather than the surangular acting as the overlapping bone where they meet. The surangular internally bears a large fossa for the jaw's adductor (vertical biting) muscles, and a prominent surangular foramen is positioned in front of the jaw joint.

T. conspicuus has a skull which is similar to T. hydroides in many regards (simplified rear edge of the premaxilla, single-cusped teeth, dentary keel). It also has some noticeable differences, such as a lack of a perforation on the maxilla, a higher number of dentary teeth (26 or more), and a trapezoidal shape to its frontals.

=== Neck ===
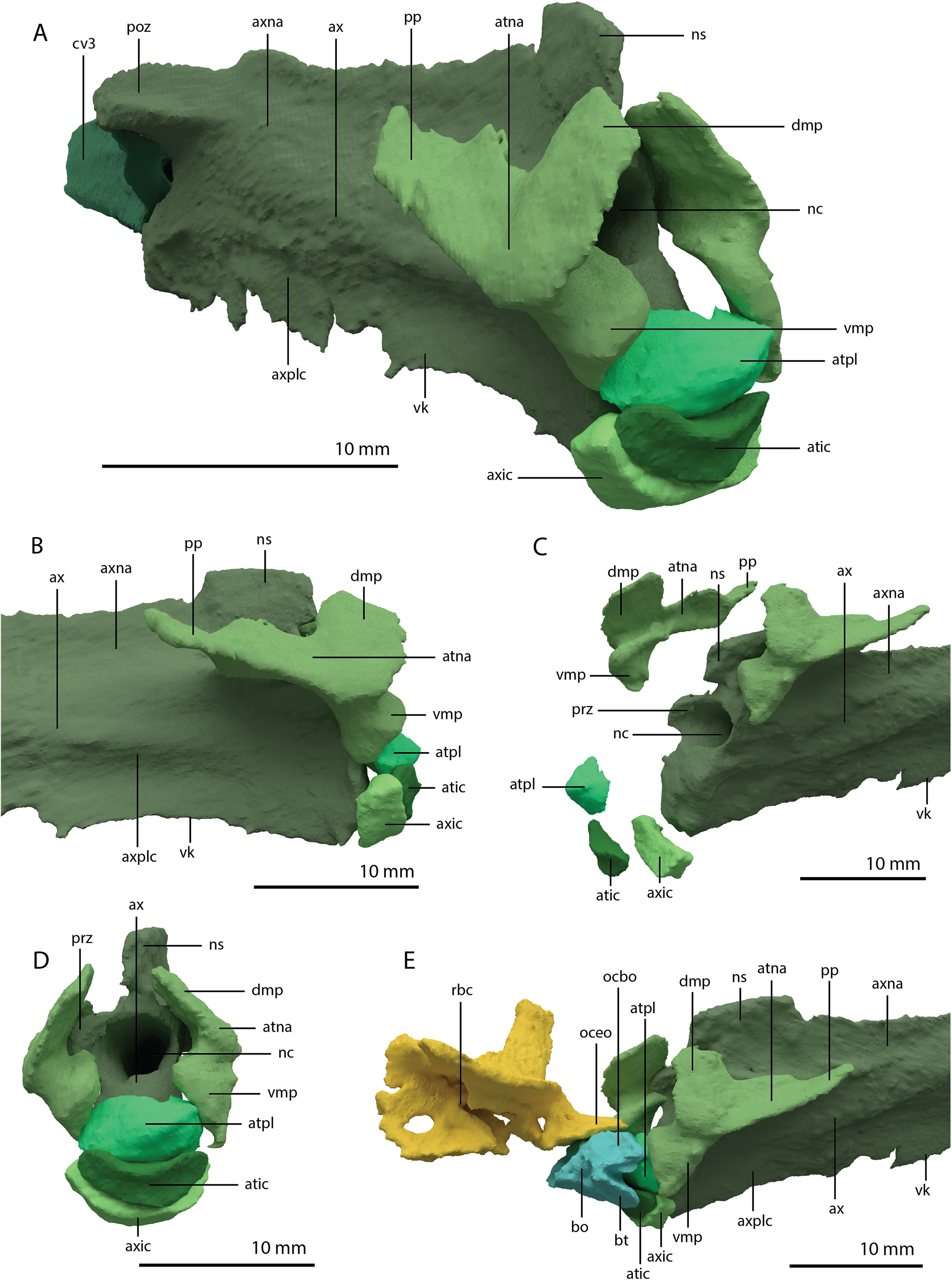
Atlas-axis complex of PIMUZ T 2790

The most recognisable feature of Tanystropheus is its hyperelongate neck, equivalent to the combined length of the body and tail. Tanystropheus has 13 cervical (neck) vertebrae, most of which are massive, though the two closest to the head are smaller and less strongly developed. The atlas (first cervical), which connects to the skull, is a small, four-part bone complex. It consists of an atlantal intercentrum (small lower component) and pleurocentrum (large lower component), and a pair of atlantal neural arches (prong-like upper components). There does not appear to be a proatlas, which slots between the atlas and skull in some other reptiles. The intercentrum and pleurocentrum are not fused to each other, unlike the single-part atlas of allokotosaurs. The tiny crescent-shaped intercentrum is overlain by a semicircular pleurocentrum, which acts as a base to the backswept neural arches. The axis (second cervical) is larger, with a small axial intercentrum followed by a much larger axial pleurocentrum. The axial pleurocentrum is longer than tall, has a low neural spine set forwards, and small prezygapophyses (front articular plates). The large postzygapophyses (rear articular plates) are separated by a broad trough and support pointed epipophyses (additional projections).

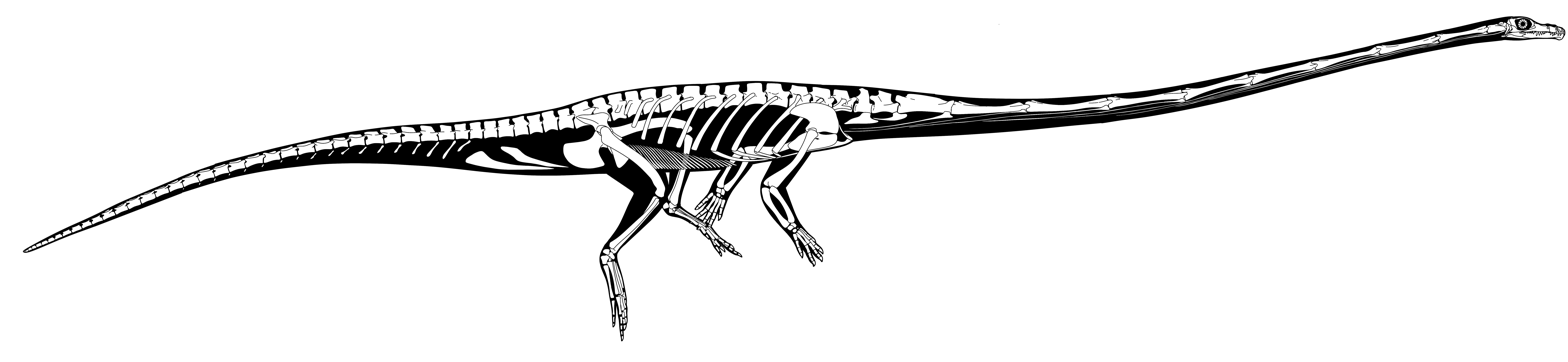
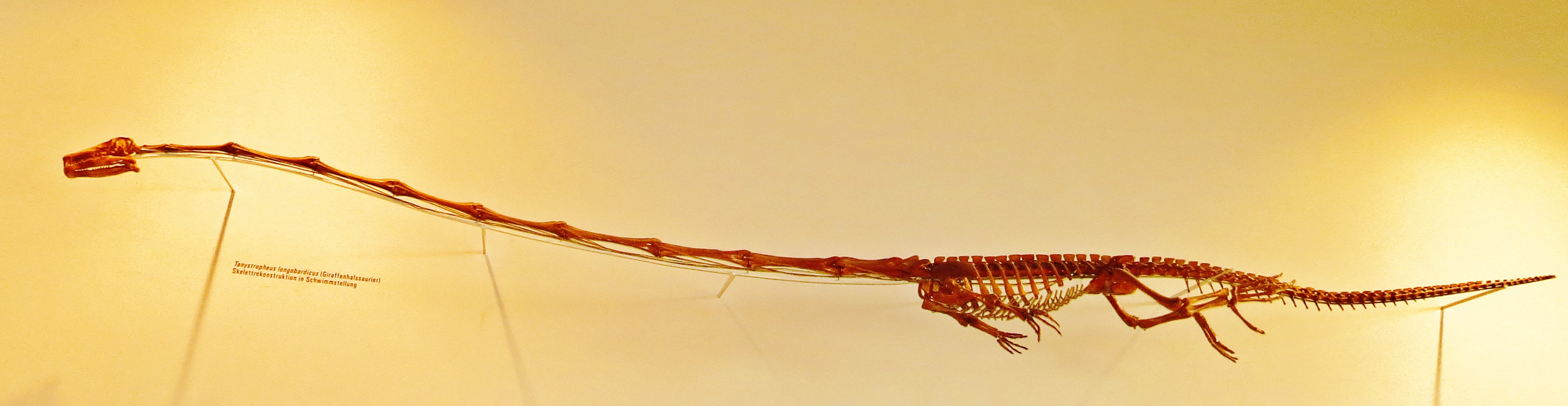
Skeletal diagram of T. hydroides (top) and mounted model skeleton (bottom) of Tanystropheus. The modeled skeleton is reconstructed from T. longobardicus and T. hydroides material

The third to eleventh cervicals are hyperelongate in most Tanystropheus species, ranging from three to 15 times longer than tall. The cervicals gradually increase in size and proportional length, with the ninth cervical typically being the largest vertebra in the skeleton. In general structure, the elongated cervicals resemble the axial pleurocentrum. However, the axis also has a keel on its underside and an incomplete neural canal, unlike its immediate successors. In the rest of the cervicals, all but the front of each neural spine is so low that it is barely noticeable as a thin ridge. The zygapophyses are closely set and tightly connected between vertebrae. The epipophyses develop into hooked spurs. The cervicals are also compressed from the side, so they are taller than wide. Many specimens have a longitudinal lamina (ridge) on the side of each cervical. Ventral keels return to vertebrae in the rear half of the neck.

All cervicals, except potentially the atlas, connected to holocephalous (single-headed) cervical ribs via facets at their front lower corner. Each cervical rib bears a short stalk connecting to two spurs running under and parallel to the vertebrae. The forward-projecting spurs were short and stubby, while the rear-projecting spurs were extremely narrow and elongated, up to three times longer than their respective vertebrae. This bundle of rod-like bones running along the neck helped spread out forces associated with lifting and bending the neck.

The 12th cervical and its corresponding ribs, though still longer than tall, are notably shorter (from front-to-back) than their predecessors. The 12th cervical has a prominent neural spine and robust zygapophyses, also unlike its predecessors. The 13th vertebra has long been assumed to be the first dorsal (torso) vertebra. This was justified by its general stout shape and supposedly dichocephalous (two-headed) rib facets, unlike the cervicals. However, specimen GMPKU-P-1527 has shown that the 13th vertebra's rib simply has a single wide articulation and an unconnected forward branch, more similar to the cervical ribs than the dorsal ribs.

The elongation of Tanystropheus's neck is mostly a consequence of particular vertebrae lengthening. This is a contrast to trachelosaurids such as Dinocephalosaurus, which achieve a long neck by the addition of numerous cervicals, for a total cervical count exceeding 30. Nevertheless, Tanystropheus does have more vertebrae in its neck than typical archosauromorphs. Protorosaurus, for example, has only seven cervicals, while Macrocnemus and Prolacerta have eight. To achieve a cervical count of 13, Tanystropheus acquired four additional elongated cervicals in the front half of the neck, in addition to a stout vertebra which shifted from the dorsal series into the base of the neck, transforming into the 13th cervical. Tanystropheids are unusual among reptiles in that they acquire their long necks without prolonged somitogenesis (an increase in the overall number of presacral vertebrae during early development). Instead, their overall number of presacral vertebrae remains at a constant count of 25, the same as their shorter-necked ancestors. This would require a shift in regionalization, encouraging the development of new cervical vertebrae rather than dorsals.

=== Torso and tail ===
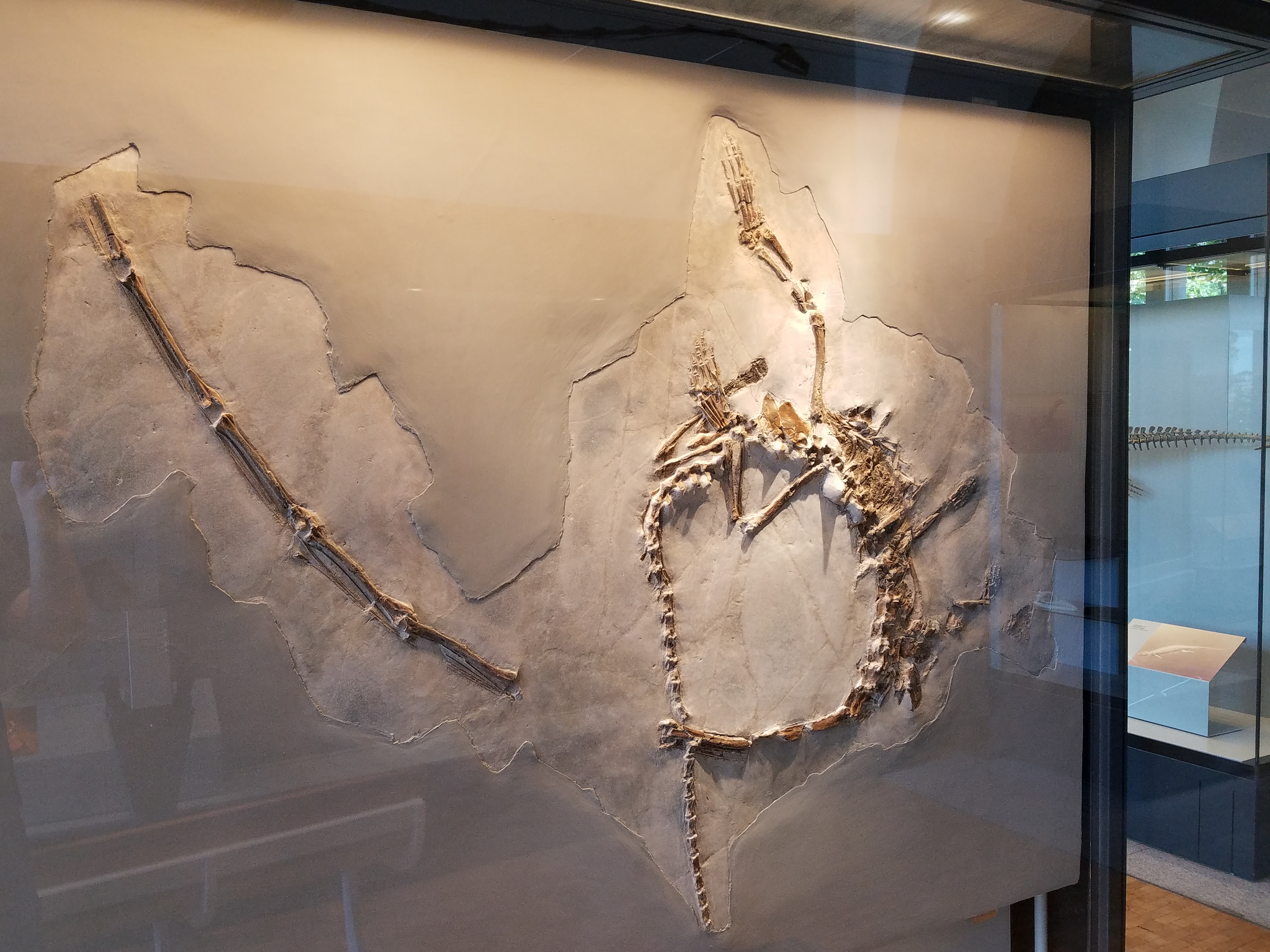
PIMUZ T 2817, a large morphotype (T. hydroides) specimen missing only the skull and a portion of the neck

There are 12 dorsal (torso) vertebrae. This count is very low among early archosauromorphs: Protorosaurus has up to 19, Prolacerta has 18, and Macrocnemus has 17. Tanystropheus's dorsals are smaller and less specialized than the cervicals. Though their neural spines are taller than those of the cervicals, they are still rather short. The dorsal ribs are double-headed close to the shoulder and single-headed in the rest of the torso, sitting on stout transverse processes projecting outwards from the front half of each vertebra. In T. conspicuus, the first few dorsal ribs have a plate-like form near their base. More than 20 angled rows of gastralia extend along the belly, each gastral element represented by a pair of segmented rods which intermingle at the midline.

The two sacral (hip) vertebrae are low but robust, bridging over to the hip with expanded sacral ribs. The latter sacral rib is a single unit without a bifurcated structure. The dorsal and sacral vertebrae of T. conspicuus are somewhat longer than those of other species, and most have neural spines with a broad, bulbous form for muscle attachment. The tail is long, with at least 30 and possible up to 50 caudal vertebrae. The first few caudals are large, with closely interlinked zygapophyses and widely projecting pleurapophyses (a term for transverse processes lacking ribs). The length of the pleurapophyses decreases until they disappear between the eighth and thirteenth caudal. The height of the neural spines also decreases gradually down the tail. A row of long chevrons is present under a short portion of the tail, though not immediately behind the hips.

=== Shoulder and forelimbs ===
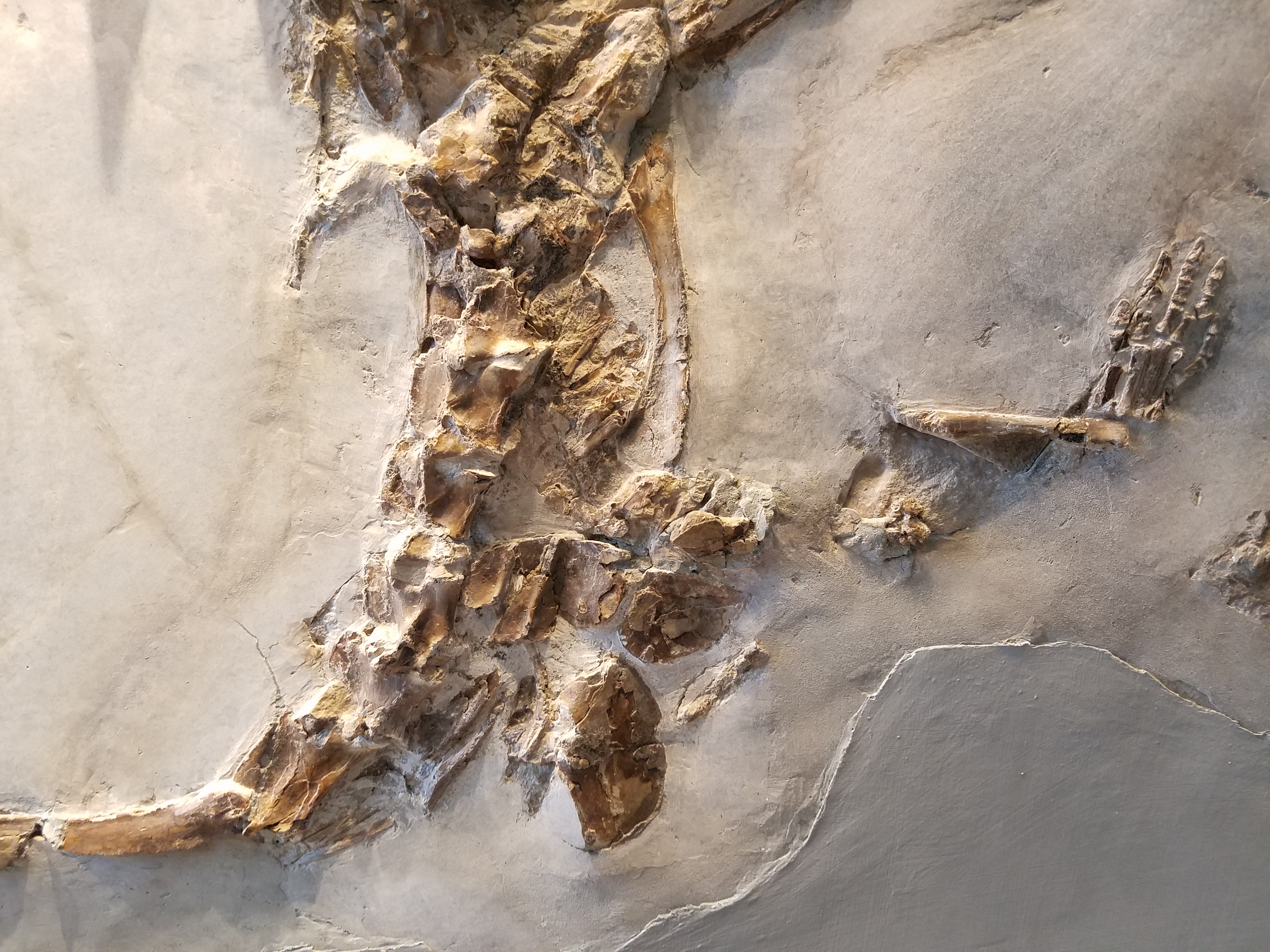
Shoulder region and forearm of PIMUZ T 2817

The pectoral girdle (shoulder girdle) has a fairly standard form shared with other tanystropheids. The clavicles (collarbones) were curved and slightly twisted rods. They lie along the front edge of the interclavicle, a plate-like bone at the center of the chest with a rhombic (broad, diamond-shaped) front region followed by a long stalk at the rear. The interclavicle is rarely preserved and its connections to the rest of the pectoral girdle are mostly inferred from Macrocnemus. In most Tanystropheus fossils, the scapula (upper shoulder blade) has the form of a large semicircular plate on a short, broad stalk. It lies above the coracoid (lower shoulder blade), which is a large oval-shaped plate with a broad glenoid facet (shoulder socket). T. conspicuus has a narrower scapula with a constricted middle portion.

The humerus (upper arm bone) is straight and slightly constricted at the middle. Near the elbow it is expanded and twisted, with an ectepicondylar groove on its outer edge. The radius (outer forearm bone) is slender and somewhat curved, while the ulna (inner forearm bone) is similar in shape to the humerus and lacks a distinct olecranon (elbow projection). There are four carpals (wrist bones): the ulnare, radiale, and two distal carpals. The ulnare and radiale are large and cuboid, enclosing a small foramen (gap) between them. The larger outer distal carpal connects to metacarpals III and IV, while the much smaller inner distal carpal connects to metacarpals II and III. Metacarpals III and IV are the largest bones in the hand, followed closely by metacarpal II. Metacarpals I and V are both short. The hand's phalangeal formula (joints per finger) is 2-3-4-4-3. The terminal phalanges (fingertips) may have formed thick, blunt claws.

=== Hip and hindlimbs ===
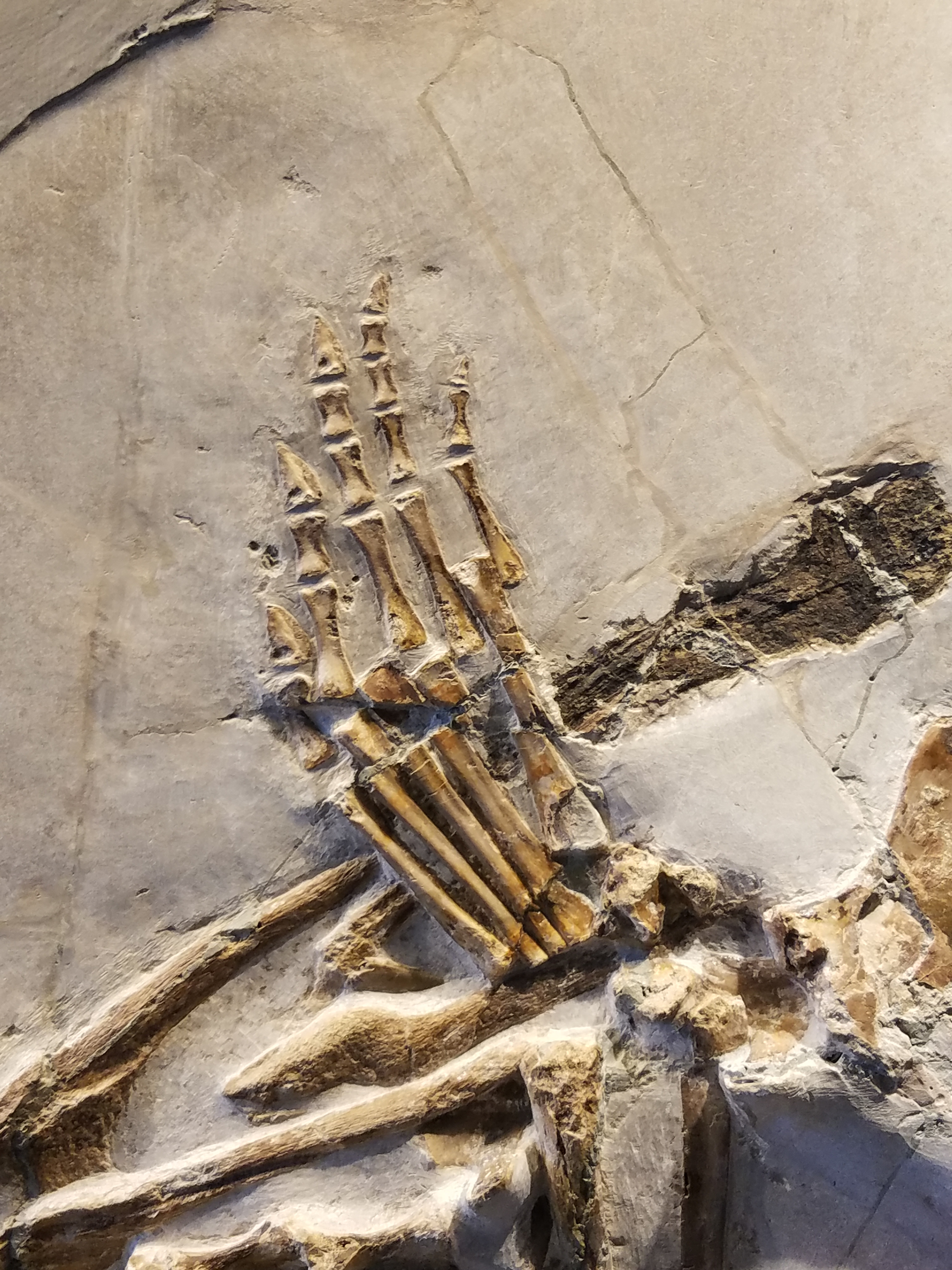
Hind foot of PIMUZ T 2817

The components of the pelvis (hip) are proportionally small, though their shape is unremarkable relative to other tanystropheids. The ilium (upper hip blade) is low and extends to a tapered point at the rear. The pubis (lower front hip blade) is vertically oriented, with a small but distinct obturator foramen and a concave rear edge. The lower front tip of the large, fan-shaped ischium (lower rear hip blade) converges towards the pubis, but does not contact it. The large oval-shaped gap between the pubis and ischium is known as the thyroid foramen.

Two pairs of large, curved bones, known as heterotopic ossifications or postcloacal bones, sit behind the hips in about half of known specimens preserving the area. They occupy the base of the tail, a region which lacks chevrons. These bones are possibly sexually dimorphic, and have also been reported in the small American tanystropheid Tanytrachelos. Heterotopic ossifications may be linked to reproductive biology, supporting reproductive organs (if they belong to males) or an egg pouch (if they belong to females).

The hindlimbs are significantly larger than the forelimbs, though similar in overall structure and proportions. The femur (thigh bone) is long, slender, and sigmoid (curved at both ends). It has a longitudinal muscle crest for muscle attachment (the internal trochanter) on its underside, and it contacts the acetabulum (hip socket) at a broad smooth joint. The tibia and fibula (shin bones) are straight, with the former much thicker and more expanded at the knee. The large proximal tarsals (ankle or heel bones contacting the shin) consist of a rounded calcaneum and a blocky astragalus, which meet each other along a straight or shallowly indented contact in most specimens. Like most non-aquatic reptiles, a set of small pebble-shaped distal tarsals are present between the proximal tarsals and the foot bones. Tanystropheus has a reduced number of distal tarsals: only a small fourth distal tarsal and a minuscule third distal tarsal. There are five closely appressed metatarsals (foot bones), with the fourth and third being the longest. Though the first four metatarsals are slender and similar in length, the fifth (outermost) is very stout and subtly hooked, slotting into the ankle along a smooth joint. The estimated phalangeal formula (joints per toe) is 2-3-4-5-4. The first phalange of the fifth toe was very long, filling a metatarsal-like role as seen in other tanystropheids.

== Classification ==
=== Historical interpretations (1920s-1980s) ===
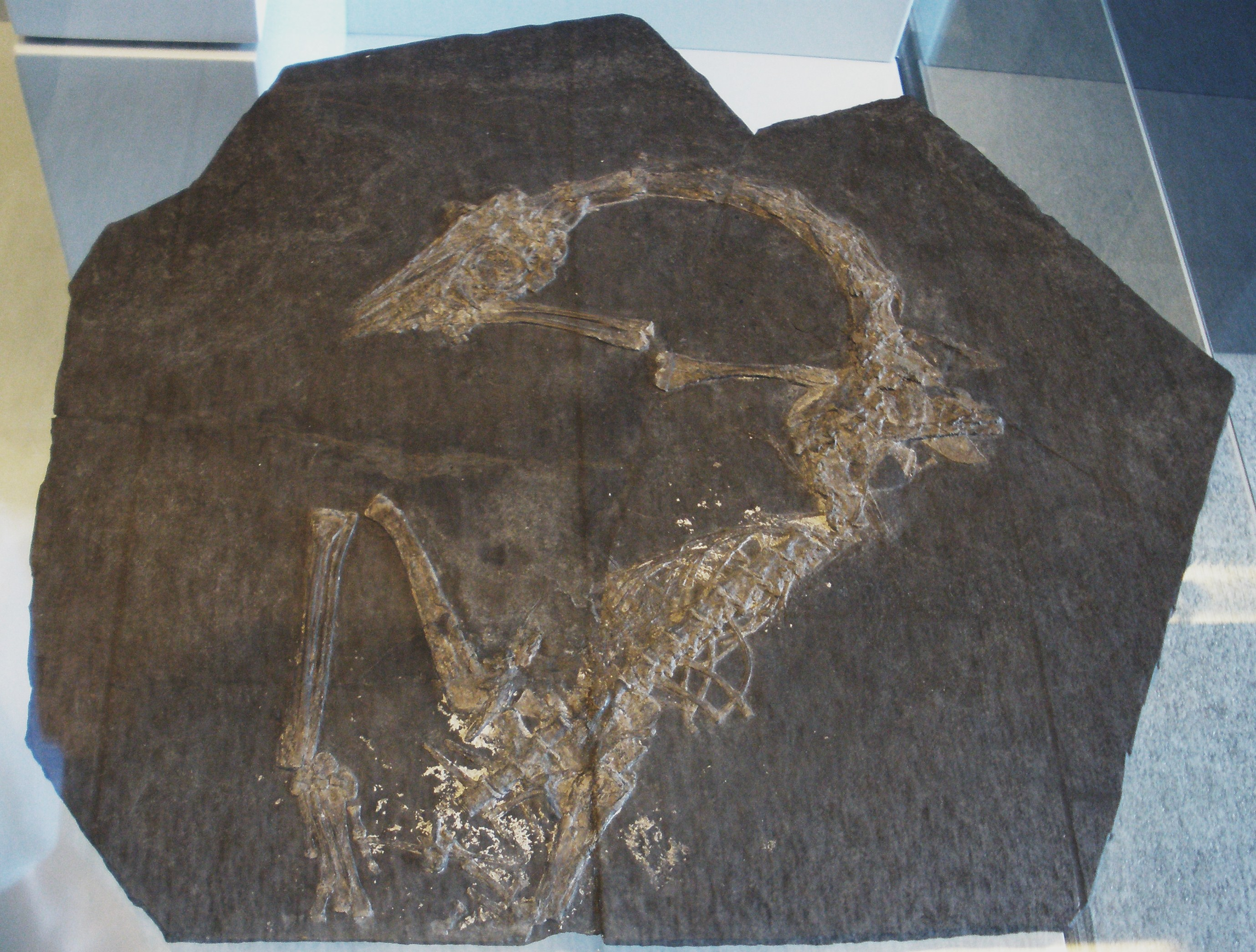
Macrocnemus, a Triassic contemporary of Tanystropheus. Since the 1930s, the two genera have been nearly universally regarded as close relatives

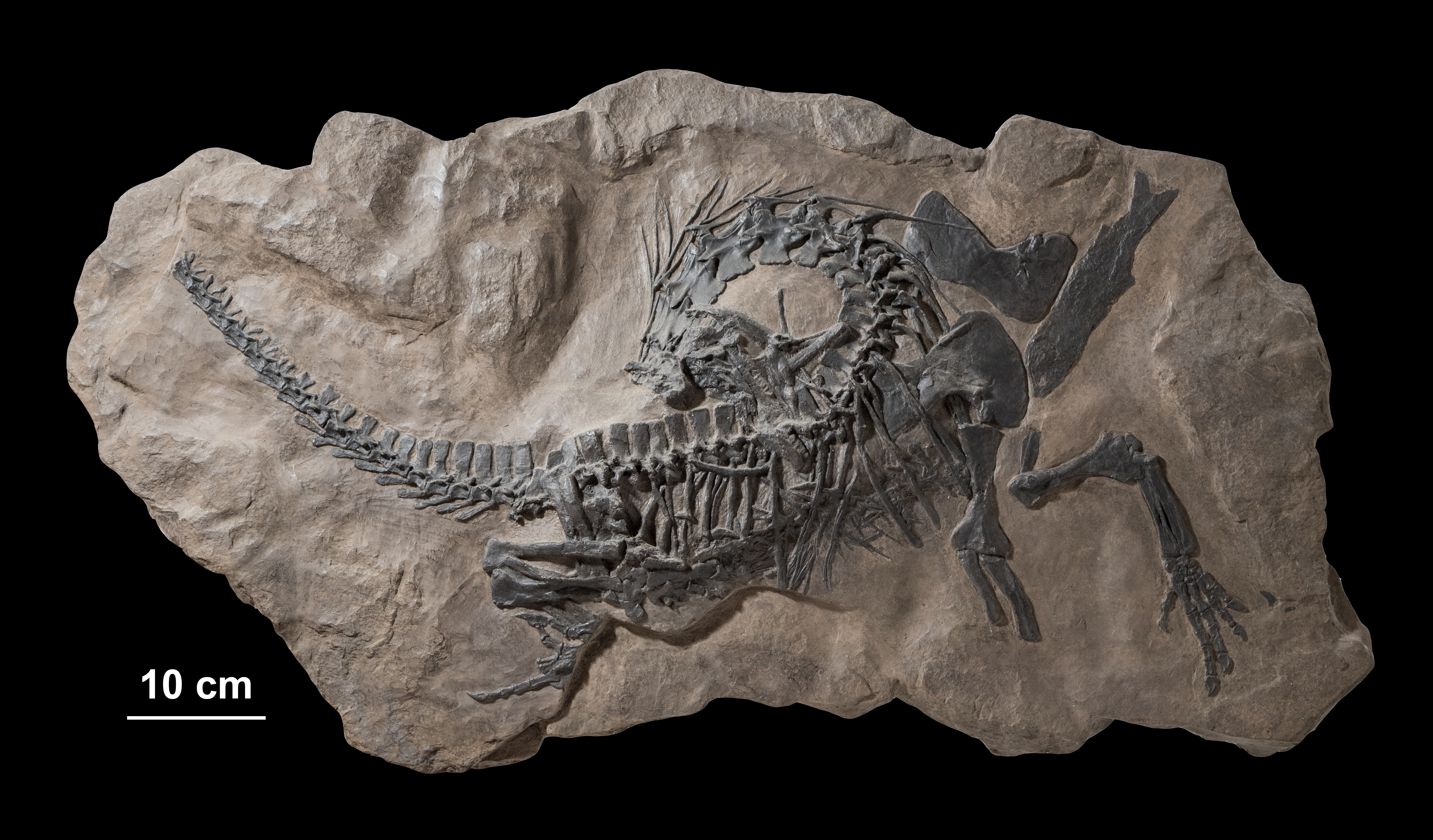
Protorosaurus, a Late Permian "protorosaur". Some 20th-century paleontologists classified Tanystropheus and Macronemus as Triassic protorosaurs.

Knowledge on the anatomy of Tanystropheus was transformed by Bernhard Peyer's discoveries in the 1920s and 1930s, but its relationship to other reptiles remained enigmatic for much of the 20th century. Most paleontologists (including modern authorities) agree that Tanystropheus was closely related to Macrocnemus, a smaller and less specialized reptile found in the same geological strata. Beyond this conclusion, Peyer initially suggested that Tanystropheus was related to other long-necked Triassic reptiles. Sauropterygians such as plesiosaurs and nothosaurs were one possibility, and another was the fragmentary German reptile Trachelosaurus. Later, Peyer classified Tanystropheus and Macrocnemus closer to "protorosaurs", a term initially used for Permian reptiles such as Protorosaurus and Araeoscelis.

In the early and mid-20th century, it was commonplace for Permian and Triassic reptiles of uncertain affinity to intermingle together in classification schemes. Names such as "Eosuchia", "Euryapsida", "Younginiformes", "Protorosauria", and others were all applied by different authors with little consistency. The Early Triassic reptile Prolacerta, from South Africa, also became involved upon its discovery. Prolacerta was the namesake of yet another term introduced into the convoluted space of reptile taxonomy: "Prolacertiformes".

As the century progressed, two competing hypotheses for the affinities of Tanystropheus developed from the groundwork set by Peyer. Both hypotheses were justified by patterns of skull fenestration (the shape of holes in the skull behind the eye) and cranial kinesis (the flexibility of joints within the skull). One idea was that Tanystropheus and kin (particularly Macrocnemus and Prolacerta) were ancestral to "lacertilians", an antiquated term for lizards. This hypothesis was supported up until the 1980s by German and Swiss paleontologists, including Rupert Wild, and Peyer's successor at Zürich, Emil Kuhn-Schnyder. The other idea maintained that Tanystropheus was a "protorosaur", closer to Protorosaurus and Araeoscelis and unrelated to Prolacerta. This was popular among American paleontologists like Alfred Romer. Some publications from the mid-20th century argued that "protorosaurs" were "euryapsids" (reptiles with only an upper temporal fenestra) related to sauropterygians, though later accounts admitted that Euryapsida was likely polyphyletic, with its members lacking a common ancestor.

In 1975, a paper by South African paleontologist C.E. Gow argued that none of these hypotheses were entirely correct. He proposed that Prolacerta, and by extension Macrocnemus and Tanystropheus, occupied an extinct spur on the reptile family tree near the ancestry of archosaurs, a diverse group of reptiles with lightweight skulls and serrated teeth set in deep sockets. Dinosaurs are among the most famous subset of archosaurs, as are modern crocodilians and their prehistoric ancestors. Several newly discovered "prolacertiforms", including Tanystropheus-, Protorosaurus-, and Prolacerta-like species, were described in the 1970s, not long after the field of paleontology was reinvigorated by the "dinosaur renaissance" in the 1960s and beyond.

=== Cladistics and Archosauromorpha (1980s-1990s) ===
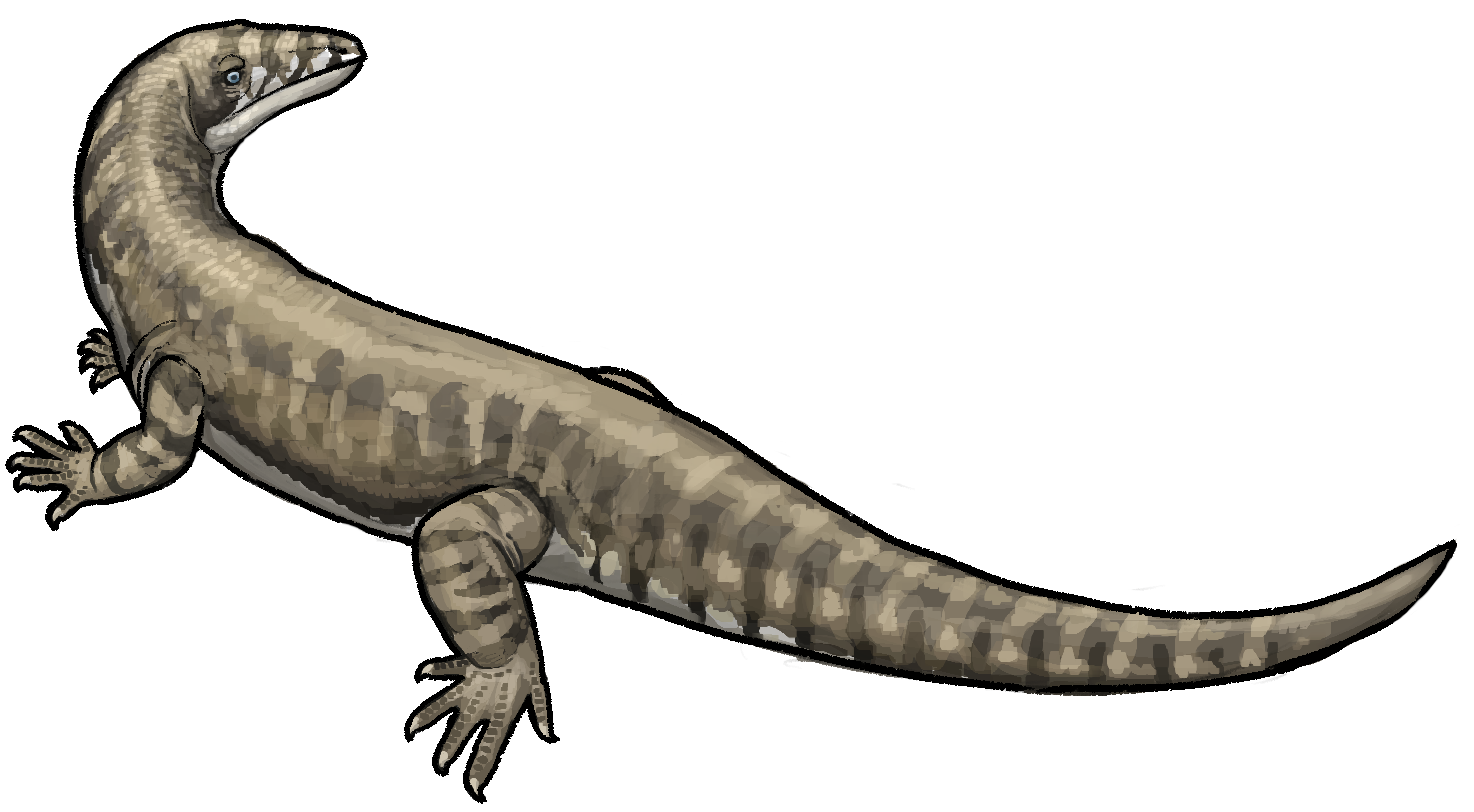
Cladistic analyses agree that Tanystropheus belongs within a clade or grade of basal archosauromorphs. Many studies from the 1970s to 1990s referred to long-necked basal archosauromorphs as "prolacertiforms" (namesake Prolacerta pictured)

In the 1980s, the advent of cladistics saw a paradigm shift in the field of taxonomy, emphasizing monophyletic clades (all-encompassing groups defined by shared ancestry) over other categorization styles. Phylogenetic analyses were invented to evaluate reptile evolution in a quantitative manner, by collecting a set of characteristics in sampled species and then using computational models to find the simplest (most parsimonious) path evolution could take to produce that character distribution. Cladistics stabilized and defined a fundamental split in the family tree of reptiles: one side of the family tree, Lepidosauromorpha, leads to lepidosaurs such as squamates (lizards and snakes) and the tuatara. The other side, Archosauromorpha, leads to archosaurs. Cladistics was one of many lines of evidence that helped to demonstrate the dinosaurian origin of birds. This left crocodilians and birds as the two surviving archosaur groups.

A series of phylogenetic analyses in the late 1980s and 1990s strongly supported the proposal of Gow (1975). Tanystropheus, Macrocnemus, Protorosaurus, and Prolacerta were always placed as members of Archosauromorpha, closer to archosaurs than to squamates. "Protorosauria" and "Prolacertiformes" were used interchangeably for the archosauromorph subgroup encompassing these superficially lizard-like reptiles. Some authors preferred "Protorosauria" for its priority. Most others used "Prolacertiformes" arguing that "Protorosauria" was a name that carried too much historical baggage, since it had previously encompassed non-archosauromorph "euryapsids" like Araeoscelis.

As a "prolacertiform", Tanystropheus is typically considered the sister taxon to Tanytrachelos, a much smaller tanystropheid from Virginia. Another small tanystropheid, Cosesaurus from Spain, is allied with the Tanystropheus + Tanytrachelos clade in many analyses of the 1980s and 1990s. Within Archosauromorpha, "prolacertiforms" are joined by several other groups. The clade Archosauriformes is a diverse archosauromorph subset including crown group archosaurs and their predatory close relatives such as Euparkeria and Proterosuchus. Stocky Triassic herbivores like rhynchosaurs, Trilophosaurus, and azendohsaurids additionally qualify as archosauromorphs. The bizarre chameleon-like drepanosaurs were also included by many analyses, though more recently they have been reinterpreted as a more basal type of reptile unrelated to Archosauromorpha.

The following cladogram is from Dilkes (1998), a study with a small sample of "prolacertiforms" but closer resemblance to most analyses of the 2000s and 2010s:

- Sauria
  - - †Gephyrosaurus
    - Squamata
  - Archosauromorpha
    - - †Protorosaurus
      - - †Drepanosauridae
        - †Tanystropheidae
          - Macrocnemus
          - - Langobardisaurus
            - Tanystropheus
    - - †Trilophosaurus
      - - †Rhynchosauria
        - - †Prolacerta
          - Archosauriformes

=== Recent studies and the rejection of "prolacertiform" monophyly (2000s-present) ===
Starting with Dilkes (1998), many phylogenetic analyses began to recover Prolacerta in a position close to archosauriforms and away from other "prolacertiforms". In addition, a 2009 redescription of Protorosaurus shifted it away from Tanystropheus and close to the base of Archosauromorpha. These results have driven paleontologists to the conclusion that "Protorosauria" / "Prolacertiformes" is not a natural monophyletic clade and fails to adequately describe the structure of Archosauromorpha. In the modern cladistic framework, it could be considered a paraphyletic grade or polyphyletic category of archosauromorphs united by "primitive" characteristics (such as a slender neck and lizard-like body) rather than a shared evolutionary history.

The family Tanystropheidae has come to succeed those older names, acting as a monophyletic clade oriented around Tanystropheus. Tanystropheidae hosts a growing list of former "protorosaurs" with closer affinities to Tanystropheus than to Prolacerta, Protorosaurus, or other major archosauromorph groups. Tanystropheus is well-nested within Tanystropheidae, sometimes as the sister taxon to Amotosaurus. Macrocnemus is most commonly the basal-most (first diverging) tanystropheid.

The following cladogram is from Pritchard et al. (2015), a study focused specifically on tanystropheids:

- Sauria
  - Lepidosauromorpha
  - Archosauromorpha
    - - †Protorosaurus
      - - - †Mesosuchus
          - - †Rhynchosaurus
            - †Teyumbaita
        - - †Tanystropheidae
            - Macrocnemus
            - - - Langobardisaurus
                - - Tanytrachelos
                  - Hayden Quarry taxon
                    (a small unnamed tanystropheid from Ghost Ranch)
              - - Amotosaurus
                - Tanystropheus
          - - - †Trilophosaurus
              - †Teraterpeton
            - - †Prolacerta
              - Archosauriformes

The following cladogram is from Ezcurra (2016), a study focused generally on archosauromorphs and early archosauriforms:

- Sauria
  - Lepidosauromorpha
  - †Choristodera
  - Archosauromorpha
    - - †Aenigmastropheus
      - - †Protorosaurus
        - - - †Jesairosaurus
            - †Tanystropheidae
              - Macrocnemus
              - - Amotosaurus
                - Tanystropheus
          - Crocopoda
            - †Allokotosauria
            - - †Rhynchosauria
              - - †Boreopricea
                - - †Prolacertidae
                  - - †Tasmaniosaurus
                    - Archosauriformes

A set of phylogenetic analyses by Spiekman et al. (2021) attempted to tackle the question of "protorosaur" relationships using an expanded and updated sample of archosauromorph species described over the past few decades. Tanystropheus was split into five taxonomic units in this study: T. longobardicus, T. hydroides, T. conspicuus, "T. antiquus" (Protanystropheus), and GMPKU P1527 (the large Chinese Tanystropheus specimen). Two types of analyses were designed to test for bias: one disregarded non-discrete characters and character state ordering, while the other included these settings. In some analyses, "wildcard" taxa with inconsistent positions were excluded to improve resolution.

Regardless of the setting, T. longobardicus, T. hydroides, T. conspicuus, and GMPKU P1527 always formed a clade, though the latter two were excluded from some analyses as "wildcards". Under some settings (but not the most stable analysis), another tanystropheid was added to this clade: Raibliania calligarisi, from the Carnian of Italy. The main Tanystropheus clade was well-nested within Tanystropheidae. "Tanystropheus antiquus", whenever included in an analysis, was never found to clade with the other Tanystropheus taxa. Instead, it was consistently allied with Dinocephalosaurus and Pectodens, forming the newly named clade Dinocephalosauridae, outside of Tanystropheidae. Sclerostropheus fossai, another species formerly referred to Tanystropheus, was an unpredictable "wildcard", sometimes placed within Dinocephalosauridae and other times within Tanystropheidae.

A 2024 study recognized Trachelosaurus as a close relative of Dinocephalosaurus, with their family as the sister taxon to Tanystropheidae. Dinocephalosauridae was renamed to Trachelosauridae, and the Trachelosauridae + Tanystropheidae clade was given the name Tanysauria.

The following cladogram is a simplified representation of the most stable analysis preferred by Spiekman et al. (2021), analysis 4. In this particular analysis, ratio (continuous) characters are included, certain characters are ordered, and five wildcard taxa are excluded before running the analysis: Czatkowiella harae, Tanystropheus conspicuus, "Tanystropheus antiquus", Orovenator mayorum and Elessaurus gondwanoccidens.

- Archosauromorpha
  - †Protorosaurus
  - - †Prolacerta
    - - †Jesairosaurus
      - †Dinocephalosauridae
    - - †Tanystropheidae
        - - Macrocnemus bassanii
          - Macrocnemus fuyuanensis
        - - Macrocnemus obristi
          - - Langobardisaurus
            - - Fuyuansaurus
              - - Augustaburiania
                - - Amotosaurus
                  - - Ozimek
                    - - Sclerostropheus
                      - Raibliania
              - - - AMNH FARB 7206 (an unnamed Tanytrachelos-like tanystropheid from New Jersey)
                  - Tanytrachelos
                - - Tanystropheus hydroides
                  - GMPKU P 1527 (T. cf. hydroides)
                  - Tanystropheus longobardicus
      - Crocopoda
        - †Allokotosauria
        - †Rhynchosauria
        - - †Teyujagua
          - Archosauriformes

== Paleoecology ==
=== Diet ===
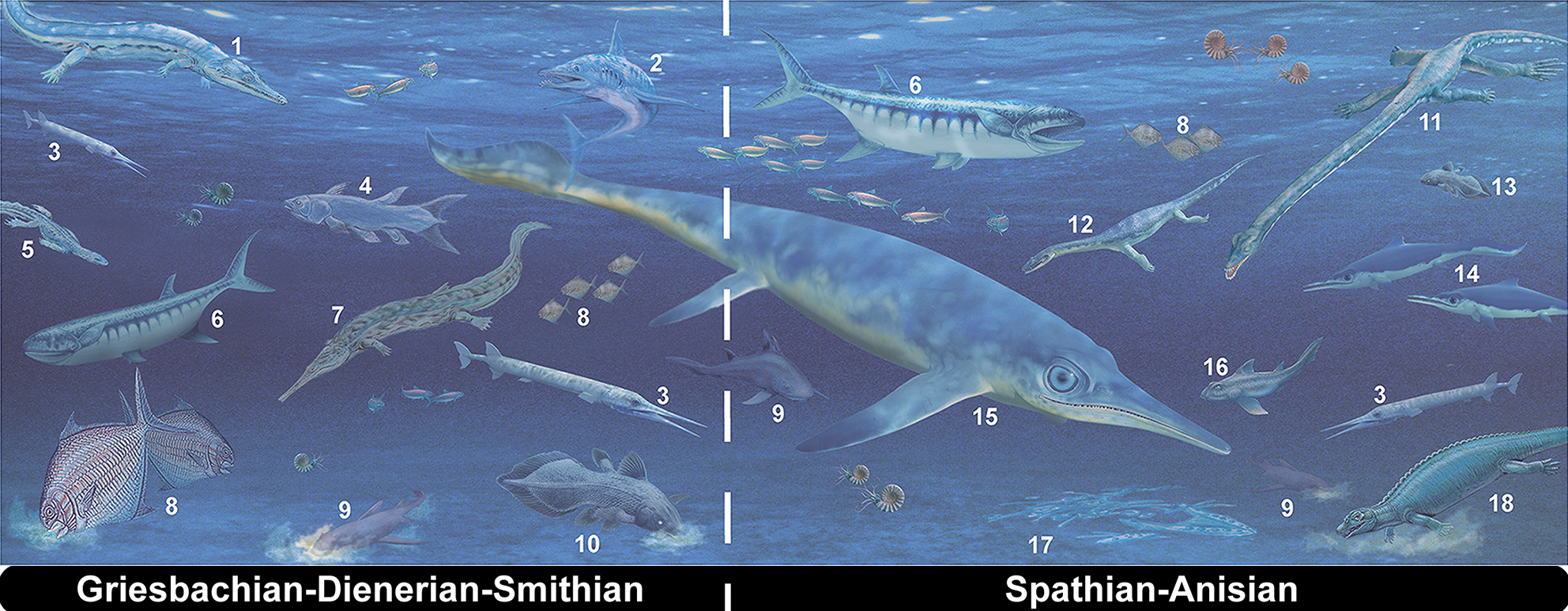
Tanystropheus (11) with other marine predators from the Early Triassic (Griesbachian substage) to the Middle Triassic (Anisian stage)

The diet of Tanystropheus has been strongly debated in the past, though most recent studies consider it a piscivorous (fish-eating) reptile. The teeth at the front of the snout are long, conical, and interlocking, similar to those of nothosaurs and plesiosaurs. This was likely an adaptation for catching aquatic prey. Additionally, fish scales and hooklets from cephalopod tentacles have been found in the stomach region of some specimens, further support for a piscivorous diet.

Small specimens from Monte San Giorgio (T. longobardicus) are noted to possess tricuspid teeth at the back of the jaw. This shape is unorthodox and uncommon among extinct or living reptiles. Wild (1973/1974) considered these three-cusped teeth to be an adaptation for gripping insects. Cox (1985) noted that marine iguanas, which feed on algae, also have three-cusped teeth. As a result, he attributed the same preferences to Tanystropheus. Taylor (1989) rejected both of these hypotheses, as he interpreted the neck of Tanystropheus to be too inflexible for the animal to be successful at either lifestyle.

The most likely function of tricuspid teeth, as explained by Nosotti (2007), was that they assisted the piscivorous diet of the reptile by helping to grip slippery prey such as fish or squid. Several modern species of seals, such as the hooded seal and crabeater seal, also have multi-cusped teeth which assist their diet to a similar effect. Similar teeth have also been found in the pterosaur Eudimorphodon and the fellow tanystropheid Langobardisaurus, both of which are considered piscivores. Crustaceans and other soft invertebrates are also plausible food items for Tanystropheus longobardicus. Larger individuals (Tanystropheus hydroides) lack three-cusped teeth, instead possessing typical conical fangs along the entire rim of the mouth. This difference in dentition indicates a degree of niche partitioning, with T. hydroides preferring larger and more active prey than T. longobardicus.

=== Predation ===
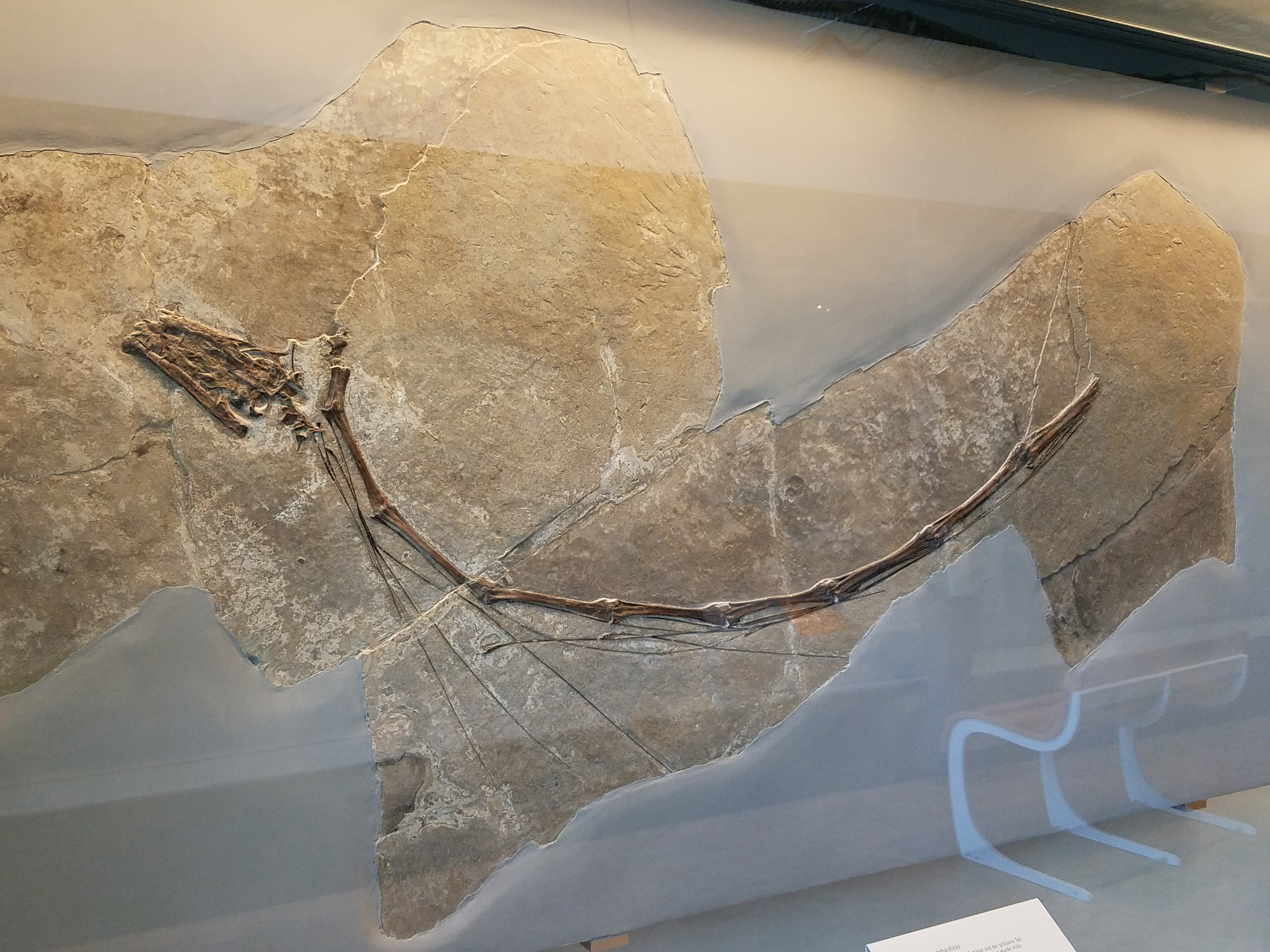
PIMUZ T 2819, a T. hydroides specimen which was decapitated by a larger predator

While long necks were a successful evolutionary strategy for many marine reptile clades during the Mesozoic, they also increased the animals' vulnerability to predation. Spiekman and Mujal (2023) investigated two Tanystropheus fossils (PIMUZ T 2819 and PIMUZ T 3901), each consisting solely of a skull attached to an articulated partial neck. PIMUZ T 2819 (a large specimen of T. hydroides) is preserved up to cervical vertebra 10, which is splintered by punctures and scoring. The shape of the marks indicate that the neck was severed in two rapid bites by a predator attacking from above and behind. A similar predation attempt occurred against PIMUZ T 3901 (the Meride Limestone specimen of T. longobardicus), which was bitten at cervical 5 and severed at cervical 7.

The authors further suggested that since the decapitation occurred in the mid-section of the neck, this was likely an optimal target due to its distance from the head and the muscular base of the neck. While many marine predators were capable of attacking PIMUZ T 3901, only the largest predators of the Besano Formation could have attacked PIMUZ T 2819. Paranothosaurus giganteus, Cymbospondylus buchseri, and Helveticosaurus zollingeri are all candidates for the latter case.

== Paleobiology ==
=== Skull biomechanics ===
In T. hydroides, the connection between the quadrate and squamosal is loose, with the upper extremity of the quadrate hooking into a deep concavity on the squamosal. This would have enabled a degree of flexibility along the quadrate-squamosal contact, allowing the quadrate to swivel around an otic joint. This a condition is a form of cranial kinesis (movement among bones in the cranium) known as streptostyly, which is found in some living lizards. The quadrate is also loosely connected to the pterygoid, and the quadratojugal fails to contact the jugal, two qualities which allow movement of the quadrate without hindrance. While streptostyly is possible in the reconstructed skull, it cannot be demonstrated whether it was actively used by the living animal.

Fragments of rod-like hyobranchial elements (throat bones) have been found in fossils of both T. hydroides and T. longobardicus. These hyobranchials are very slender and disarticulated, without a bony corpus (thickened "body" of the hyoid apparatus) to connect elements from either side of the throat. These traits indicate that Tanystropheus relied on biting and enlarged teeth to capture prey. Suction feeding is rejected, since it is correlated with a more robust and integrated hyoid apparatus.

=== Growth and development ===
Histological sampling has demonstrated that Tanystropheus had a fairly slow growth rate. The femur, cervical vertebrae, cervical ribs, and postcloacal bones all have a lamellar or parallel-fibered cortex. This corresponds to slow and sturdy bone accumulation. Lamellar deposition is characteristic of the cervical ribs and the upper part of the vertebra, and sharpey's fibers are abundant in the cervical ribs and postcloacal bones. The upper part of the vertebra is subject to remodeling by secondary osteons, smoothing out and strengthening that part of the bone as the animal grows. There is no evidence for woven-fibered bone, a type of uneven fast-developing texture apparent in many archosauromorphs, including other "protorosaurs" like Aenigmastropheus and Prolacerta. This suggests that Tanystropheus (and its relative Macrocnemus) retained an ancestrally low metabolic rate more similar to lizards than to archosauriforms.

=== Respiration ===
As neck length increases, so does tracheal volume, which imposes a biological limitation on breathing. Every time the animal inhales, a significant portion of oxygenated air (so-called dead space volume) fails to pass fully through the trachea and reach the lungs. Many long-necked animals have adaptations meant to overcome this limitation. For example, giraffes have a narrow trachea and infrequent breathing, which reduces the dead space volume. Sauropod dinosaurs supplement their trachea with air sacs that allow for greater air movement through the respiratory system. Birds utilize both air sacs and infrequent breathing. Tanystropheus would need to rely on exceptionally specialized lungs which exceed any allometric predictions based on modern reptiles. In a compromise between energy usage and minimizing dead space volume, the ideal trachea width for Tanystropheus is around 1 cm (0.4 inches), for a neck 1.7 meters (5.6 feet) in length. During periods of high activity, the only lung structure capable of meeting oxygen needs is a multicameral lung (partitioned into multiple smaller chambers) with unidirectional air flow and infrequent breathing. This type of respiratory system is seen in modern archosaurs and turtles. In any case, Tanystropheus's lung capacity was too small for frequent activity or life at higher altitudes. This supports its proposed ecology as coastal ambush predator.

=== Soft tissue ===
A specimen described by Renesto in 2005 displayed an unusual "black material" around the rear part of the body, with smaller patches at the middle of the back and tail. Although most of the material was amorphous, the portion just in front of the hip seemingly preserved scale impressions, indicating that the black material was the remnants of soft tissue. The scales seem to be semi-rectangular and do not overlap with each other, similar to the integument reported in a juvenile Macrocnemus described in 2002. The portion of the material at the base of the tail is particularly thick and rich in phosphate. Many small spherical structures are also present in this portion, which upon further preparation were revealed to be composed of calcium carbonate. These chemicals suggest that the black material was formed as a product of the specimen's proteins decaying in a warm, stagnant, and acidic environment. As in Macrocnemus, the concentration of this material at the base of the tail suggests that the specimen had a quite noticeable amount of muscle behind its hips.

=== Brain and inner ear ===
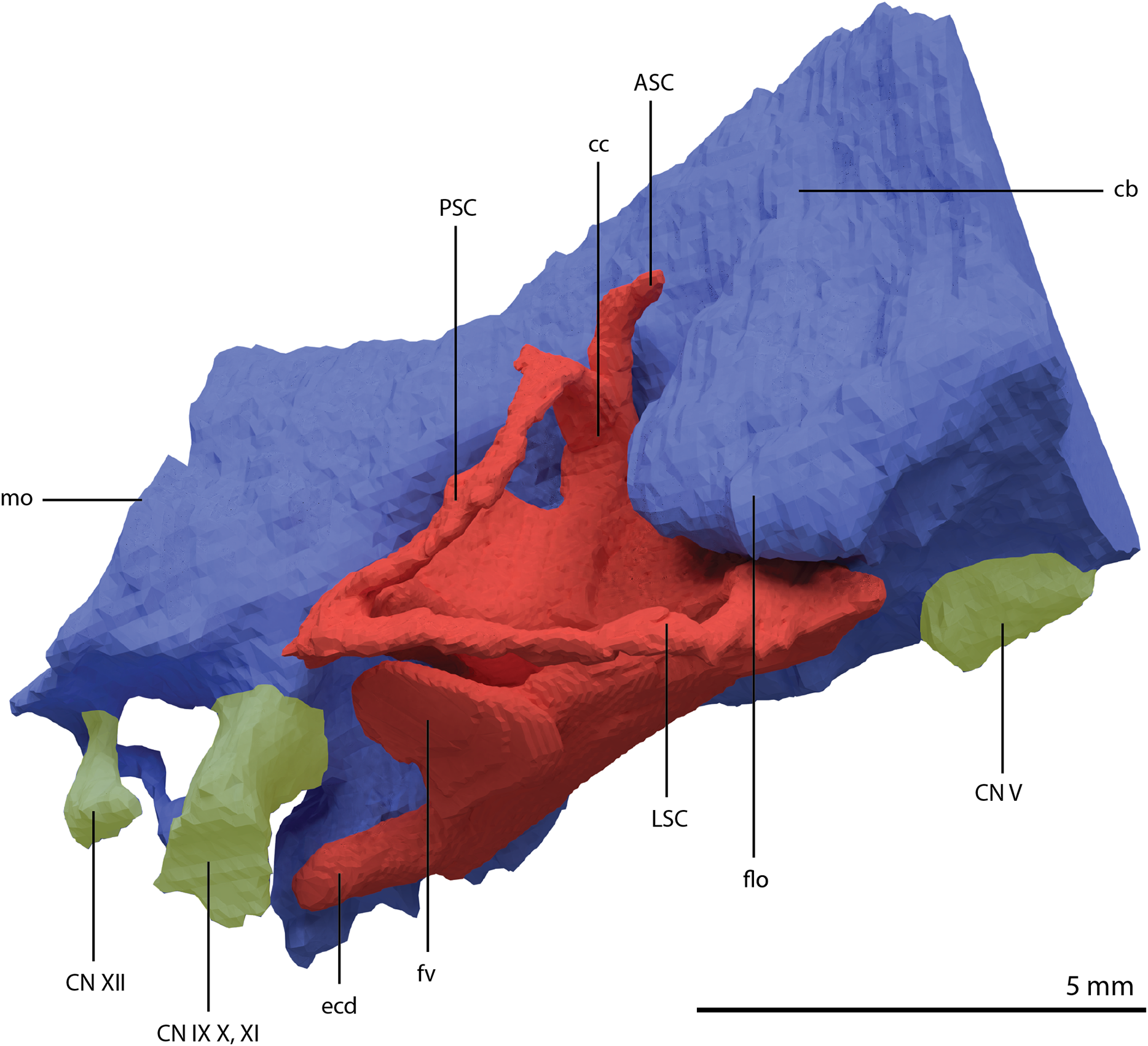
Digital endocast of PIMUZ T 2790, showing the brain cavity (blue), inner ear (red), and nerve canals (yellow)

Impressions on the frontal bones of Tanystropheus longobardicus fossils indicate that that species at least had a bulbous forebrain with paired olfactory bulbs. The complete braincase of Tanystropheus hydroides specimen PIMUZ T 2790 allowed for a partial reconstruction of the brain cavity and inner ear via a digital endocast. The flocculus is large and broad and leads forward to the rest of the cerebellum, which is narrowest between the endosseus labyrinth (inner ear canals). A large flocculus may relate to greater head and eye stabilization, though evidence is inconclusive. Long-necked sauropods show a reduction of the flocculus and there is no clear correlation between flocculus size and function in modern mammals and birds. Like other reptiles, Tanystropheus has three semicircular canals ringing out of the inner ear. Tanystropheus likely stayed in shallow waters or on land, since its semicircular canals are much thinner than those of deep-diving seabirds. The anterior semicircular canal, which curves up and around the flocculus, is enlarged. The posterior semicircular canal (which slopes backwards and outwards from the brain) is smaller, as is the lateral semicircular canal (which arches outwards). The lateral semicircular canal is nearly horizontal in orientation, which possibly relates to a horizontal head posture. There is also a long straight cochlear duct extending outwards, and a long cochlear duct typically indicates good hearing ability in living reptiles.

=== Movement on land ===
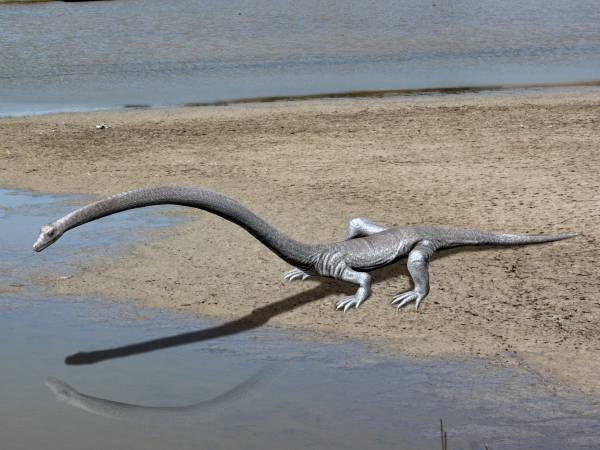
Life reconstruction of T. longobardicus hunting from the seashore

The lifestyle of Tanystropheus is controversial, with different studies favoring a terrestrial or aquatic lifestyle for the animal. Major studies on Tanystropheus anatomy and ecology by Rupert Wild (1973/1974, 1980) argued that it was an active terrestrial predator, keeping its head held high with an S-shaped flexion. Though this interpretation is not wholly consistent with its proposed neck biomechanics, more recent arguments have supported the idea that Tanystropheus was fully capable of movement on land.

Renesto (2005) argued that the neck of Tanystropheus was lighter than previously suggested, and that the entire front half of the body was more lightly built than the more robust and muscular rear half. In addition to strengthening the hind limbs, the large hip and tail muscles would have shifted the animal's center of mass rearwards, stabilizing the animal as it maneuvered its elongated neck. The neck of Tanystropheus has low neural spines, a condition which posits that its epaxial musculature was underdeveloped. This would suggest that intrinsic back muscles (such as the m. longus cervicis) were the driving force behind neck movement instead. The zygapophyses of the neck overlap horizontally, which would have limited lateral movement. The elongated cervical ribs would have formed a brace along the underside of the neck. They may have played a similar role to the ossified tendons of many large dinosaurs, transmitting forces from the weight of the head and neck down to the pectoral girdle, as well as providing passive support by limiting dorsoventral (vertical) flexion. Unlike ossified tendons, the cervical ribs of Tanystropheus are dense and fully ossified throughout the animal's lifetime.

A 2026 preprint suggested that the cervical ribs may have been able to bend slightly, allowing the neck as a whole a wide range of motion akin to other long-necked reptiles such as plesiosaurs and sauropods. The authors reconstruct the resting position of the neck as bowed, with the central portion raised above both the head and the body. They calculate that Tanystropheus could bend its neck sideways up to 73°, upwards up to 141°, and downwards up to 130°. By replacing localized tendons and muscle fibers, the cervical rib bundles could have helped the animal maintain fine control over its neck motion with only a few muscles concentrated at the base of the neck. Enlarged ribs and muscle attachments on vertebrae at the base of the neck would have held the majority of the neck musculature, allowing it to be raised and lowered at ease. In addition, the arched shape of the neck could help store elastic energy to be released during an ambush. However, larger muscles would also add extra weight to the front of the torso, which poses issues for movement on land. The simple humerus and thin, plate-like girdle bones may have had trouble supporting the animal's weight on land, at least for larger individuals.

A pair of 2015 blog posts by paleoartist Mark Witton estimated that the neck made up only 20% of the entire animal's mass, due to its light and hollow vertebrae. By comparison, in pterosaurs of the family Azhdarchidae, which were clearly large terrestrial predators, the neck and head made up almost 50% of their mass. Witton proposed that Tanystropheus would have hunted prey from the seashore, akin to a heron. Renesto (2005) supported this type of lifestyle as well. A later published estimate argued that the neck comprised about 30 to 43% of the body mass. Terrestrial or semi-terrestrial habits are supported by taphonomic evidence: Tanystropheus specimens preserved at Monte San Giorgio have high completeness (most bones are present in an average fossil) but variable articulation (bones are not always preserved in life position). This is similar to Macrocnemus (which was terrestrial) and opposite the pattern seen in Serpianosaurus (which was fully aquatic). Renesto and Franco Saller's 2018 follow-up to Renesto (2005) offered more information on the reconstructed musculature of Tanystropheus. This study determined that the first few tail vertebrae of Tanystropheus would have housed powerful tendons and ligaments that would have made the body more stiff, keeping the belly off the ground and preventing the neck from pulling the body over.

=== Movement in the water ===
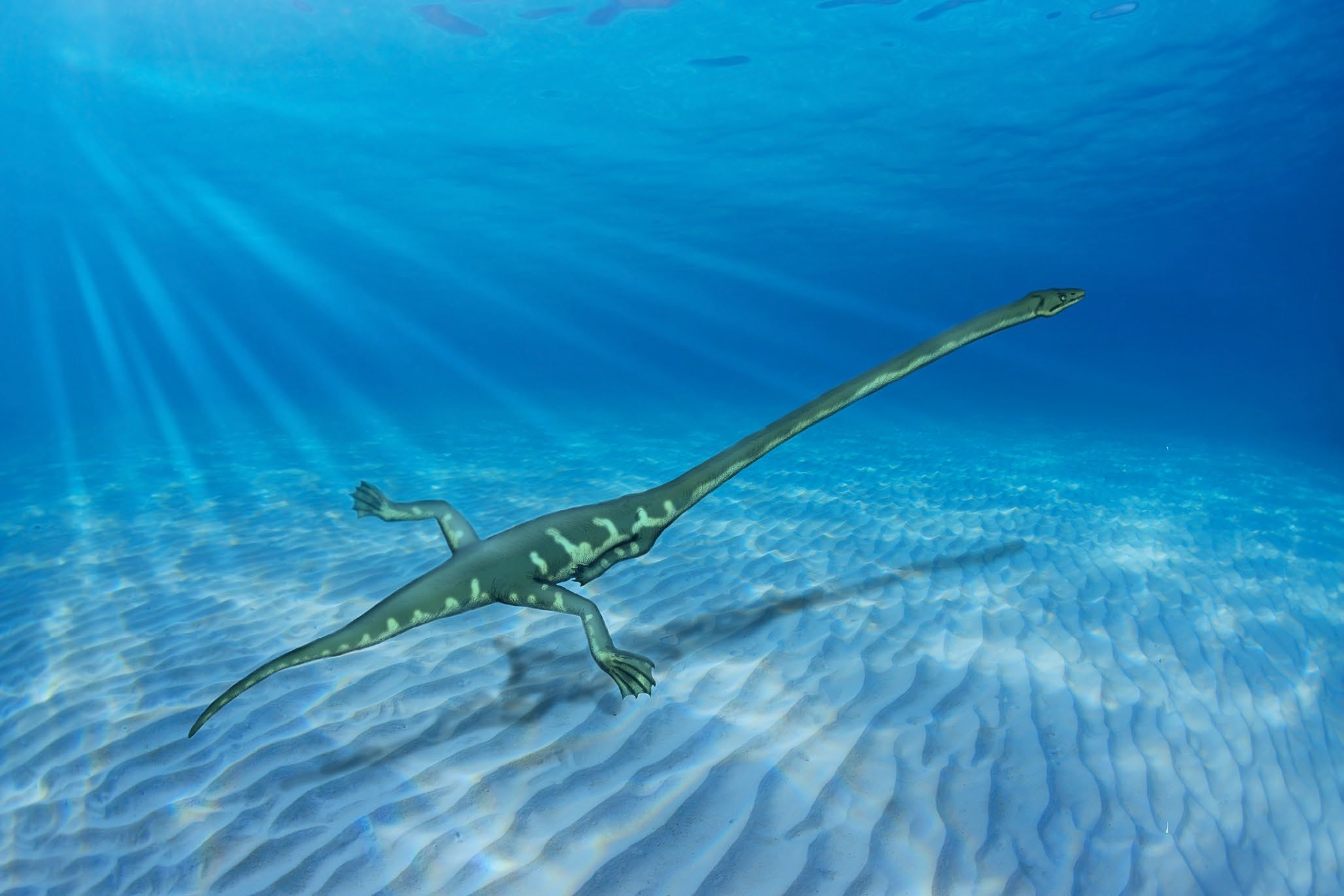
Life restoration of Tanystropheus in the water, from Renesto and Saller (2018)

Tschanz (1986, 1988) suggested that Tanystropheus lacked the musculature to raise its neck above the ground, and that it was probably completely aquatic, swimming by undulating its body and tail side-to-side like a snake or crocodile. This interpretation has been contradicted by later studies, although Tanystropheus may have still spent a large portion of its life in shallow water.

Renesto (2005) argued that Tanystropheus lacked clear adaptations for underwater swimming to the same degree as most other aquatic reptiles. The tail of Tanystropheus was compressed vertically (from top-to-bottom) at the base and thinned towards the tip, so it would not have been useful as a fin for lateral (side-to-side) movement. The long neck and short front limbs shifted the center of mass back to the long hind limbs, which would have made four-limbed swimming inefficient and unstable if that was the preferred form of locomotion. He additionally claimed that thrusting with only the hind limbs, as in swimming frogs, was an inefficient form of locomotion for a large animal such as Tanystropheus.

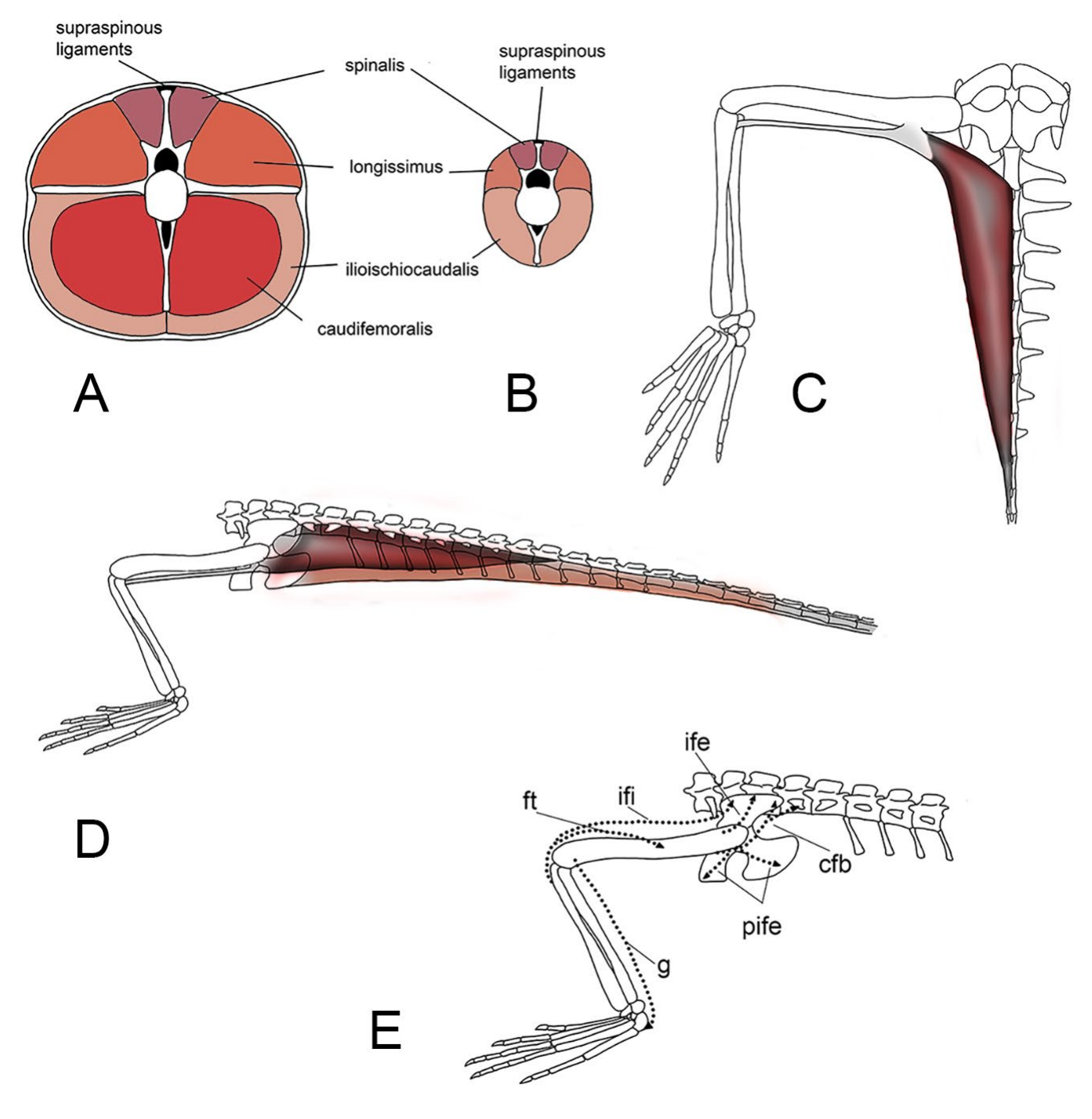
Reconstruction of the major muscles between the legs, hip, and tail in Tanystropheus, from Renesto and Saller (2018)

Contrary to earlier arguments, Renesto and Saller (2018) found some evidence that Tanystropheus was adapted for an unusual style of swimming. They noted that, based on reconstructions of muscle mass, the hind limbs would have been quite flexible and powerful according to muscle correlations on the legs, pelvis, and tail vertebrae. Their proposal was that Tanystropheus made use of a specialized mode of underwater movement: extending the hind limbs forward and then simultaneously retracting them, creating a powerful 'jump' forward. Further support for this hypothesis is based on the ichnogenus (trackway fossil) Gwyneddichnium, which was likely created by small tanystropheids such as Tanytrachelos. Some Gwyneddichnium tracks seem to represent a succession of paired sprawling footprints from the hind limbs, without any hand prints. These tracks may have been created by the same form of movement which Renesto and Saller (2018) hypothesized as the preferred method of swimming in Tanystropheus.

Nevertheless, lateral undulation cannot be disregarded as a potential swimming style; vertebrae near the hips have extended transverse processes, which are associated with powerful undulating tail muscles in reptiles such as crocodilians. Tail movements may be more effective for swimming than paddling or thrusting with the hindlimbs, since the foot bones of Tanystropheus are narrowly bundled together with little room for webbing. In T. conspicuus, tail vertebrae are notably taller than wide, potentially indicating more capacity for lateral undulation compared to other species.

The skull of Tanystropheus shows additional support for a semiaquatic habits: both T. hydroides and T. longobardicus have large undivided nares positioned on the upper surface of the snout, a location consistent with this lifestyle in other animals. In addition, the femur density approaches that of Lariosaurus, an aquatic nothosaur. When hunting underwater, Tanystropheus may have acted as an ambush predator, using its long neck to stealthily approach schools of fish or squid while keeping its large body undetected. Upon selecting a suitable prey item, it would dash forwards or snap to the side. T. hydroides was particularly well-suited for lateral biting, thanks to its low skull and procumbent fangs. A methodical and intermittent approach to underwater hunting would be appropriate for Tanystropheus, considering its lack of adaptations for an exclusively aquatic life. It was likely incapable of pursuit predation, in contrast to more persistent and specialized marine reptiles such as ichthyosaurs or plesiosaurs.

== Bibliography ==
- George Olshevsky expands on the history of "P." exogyrarum, on the Dinosaur Mailing List
- Huene, 1902. "Übersicht über die Reptilien der Trias" [Review of the Reptilia of the Triassic]. Geologische und Paläontologische Abhandlungen. 6, 1-84.
- Fritsch, 1905. "Synopsis der Saurier der böhm. Kreideformation" [Synopsis of the saurians of the Bohemian Cretaceous formation]. Sitzungsberichte der königlich-böhmischen Gesellschaft der Wissenschaften, II Classe. 1905(8), 1–7.
