= Gracilicollum =

Gracilicollum Temporal range: Middle Triassic (Anisian)

Scientific classification
- Kingdom: Animalia
- Phylum: Chordata
- Class: Reptilia
- Family: †Trachelosauridae (?)
- Genus: †Gracilicollum; Wang et al., 2023
- Species: †G. latens

Binomial name
- †Gracilicollum latens Wang et al., 2023

Extinct genus of archosauromorph reptiles

Gracilicollum (meaning "slender neck") is an extinct genus of likely tanysaurian archosauromorph from the Middle Triassic (Anisian) Guanling Formation of China. The genus contains a single species, G. latens, known from a skull and partial neck.

== Discovery and naming ==
The Gracilicollum holotype specimen, IVPP V 15636, was discovered in sediments of the Guanling Formation (Member II), dated to the Anisian age of the middle Triassic period, near Xinmin Village in Panzhou, Guizhou Province, China. The specimen, preserved on two blocks, consists of a skull preserved in ventral view articulated with a partial cervical vertebral column of at least 17 vertebrae in lateral view.

In 2023, Wang et al. described Gracilicollum latens, a new genus and species of tanystropheid archosauromorphs, based on these fossil remains. The generic name, "Gracilicollum", combines the Latin words "gracilis", meaning "slender", and "collum", meaning "neck". The specific name, "latens", refers to the fact that the fossil had not been recognized as a new species for several years after its discovery.

== Description ==
Gracilicollum was a medium-sized tanystropheid. It demonstrates similarities to tanystropheids and dinocephalosaurids, both of which have proportionately long necks. The holotype skull is approximately 82 mm (3.2 in) long. The specimen preserves seventeen cervical vertebrae, though it clearly would likely have had more in life. These vertebrae are proportionally shorter than those of the closely related Tanystropheus.

In 2017, Li, Rieppel & Fraser described the fossilized embryo of an animal similar to Dinocephalosaurus from rocks of a different locality of the Guanling Formation than the Gracilicollum holotype. Like Gracilicollum, it has a short, pointed rostrum. The specimen has 24 cervical vertebrae. Though it may represent an embryonic individual of Gracilicollum, it cannot be referred to this genus because of its early ontogenetic age and the latter's incompleteness.

== Classification ==
Wang et al. (2023) recovered Gracilicollum as a tanystropheid member of the Archosauromorpha, as the sister taxon to Tanytrachelos and Tanystropheus. Though they recovered Gracilicollum as deeply nested within the Tanystropheidae, only one additional step was required to recover it as a dinocephalosaurid (trachelosaurid). Their proposed phylogenetic relationships for basal archosauromorphs are shown in the cladogram below:

- Archosauromorpha
  - Protorosaurus
  - - Prolacerta
    - - Dinocephalosauridae
        - Pectodens
        - Dinocephalosaurus
      - Tanystropheidae
        - Macrocnemus fuyuanensis
        - Amotosaurus
        - - Gracilicollum
          - Tanytrachelos
          - Tanystropheus hydroides

In their 2024 redescription of Trachelosaurus, Spiekman et al. included Gracilicollum in their phylogenetic analyses and found support for it belonging to the Trachelosauridae (Dinocephalosauridae). They recovered it as the sister taxon to Dinocephalosaurus in a clade also containing Trachelosaurus. These three genera all have at least fourteen cervical vertebrae. Gracilicollum and Dinocephalosaurus share an accessory process on the anterior cervical ribs that extends forward to the prezygapophyses of the articulated vertebrae. Their results are shown in the cladogram below:

- Tanysauria
  - Jesairosaurus
  - - Trachelosauridae
      - - Austronaga
        - Pectodens
      - - Fuyuansaurus
        - - Trachelosaurus
          - - Gracilicollum
            - Dinocephalosaurus
    - Tanystropheidae
      - Augustaburiania
      - Luxisaurus
      - - - Macrocnemus bassanii
          - - Macrocnemus fuyuanensis
            - Macrocnemus obristi
        - - UFRGS-PV-492-T
          - - Amotosaurus
            - - Langobardisaurus
              - - - Raibliania
                  - Tanystropheus spp.
                - - Sclerostropheus
                  - - Ozimek
                    - Tanytrachelos
