= Luxisaurus =

Luxisaurus Temporal range: Middle Triassic (Anisian)

Scientific classification
- Domain: Eukaryota
- Kingdom: Animalia
- Phylum: Chordata
- Class: Reptilia
- Clade: Archosauromorpha
- Clade: †Tanysauria
- Family: †Tanystropheidae
- Genus: †Luxisaurus
- Species: †L. terrestris

Binomial name
- †Luxisaurus terrestris Lu & Liu, 2023

Extinct genus of tanystropheid reptiles

Luxisaurus (meaning "Luxi lizard") is an extinct genus of tanystropheid archosauromorph reptile from the Middle Triassic (Anisian) Guanling Formation of China. The genus contains a single species, L. terrestris, known from an articulated partial skeleton. Luxisaurus is hypothesized to have lived a more terrestrial lifestyle than many other tanystropheids, which may have been aquatic.

== Discovery and naming ==
The Luxisaurus holotype specimen, HFUT SML-21-08-001, was discovered in sediments of the Guanling Formation (Upper Member), dated to the Anisian age (Pelsonian substage) of the middle Triassic period, near Suomeiluo in Luxi County, Yunnan Province, China. The articulated incomplete specimen consists of most of both forelimbs (missing their proximal ends), most of both hindlimbs (missing part of the right femur), gastralia, elements of the pelvic girdle, part of the last dorsal vertebra, two sacral vertebrae with sacral ribs, and several proximal caudal vertebrae.

In 2023, Lu & Liu described Luxisaurus terrestris as a new genus and species of tanystropheid archosauromorph based on these fossil remains. The generic name, "''Luxisaurus", combines a reference to the type locality in Luxi County with the Greek "saurus", meaning "lizard". The specific name, "terrestris", references the hypothesized terrestrial lifestyle of Luxisaurus.

== Classification ==
Lu & Liu (2023) recovered Luxisaurus as a basal tanystropheid member of the Archosauromorpha, as the sister taxon to all other tanystropheids besides Fuyuansaurus, which is the basalmost member of the clade. They further hypothesized that, since the basalmost members of the Tanystropheidae have been found in South China, the clade may have originated here before dispersing globally. The results of their phylogenetic analyses are shown in the cladogram below:

- Archosauromorpha
  - Protorosaurus
  - - Crocopoda
    - - Jesairosaurus
      - - Dinocephalosauridae
          - Dinocephalosaurus
          - Pectodens
        - Tanystropheidae
          - Fuyuansaurus
          - - Luxisaurus
            - - Sclerostropheus
              - Elessaurus
              - Langobardisaurus
              - Tanytrachelos
              - AMNH FARB 7206 (an unnamed Tanytrachelos-like tanystropheid from New Jersey)
              - Ozimek
              - - - - - Macrocnemus bassanii
                      - - Macrocnemus obristi
                        - Macrocnemus fuyuanensis
              - - Augustaburiania
                - Amotosaurus
              - - Raibliania
                - Tanystropheus longobardicus
                - GMPKU P 1527 (T. cf. hydroides)
                - Tanystropheus hydroides
