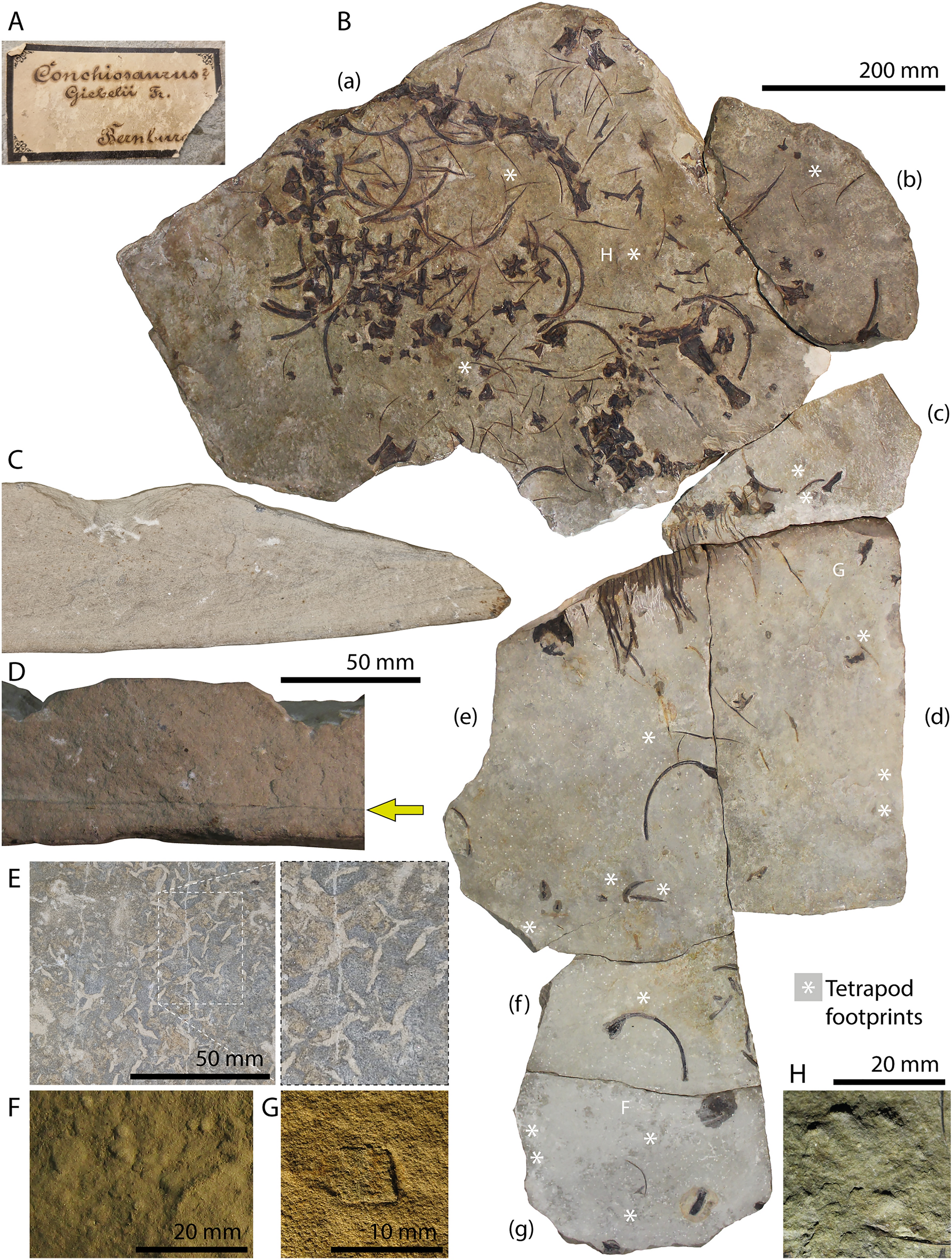
- Holotype specimen
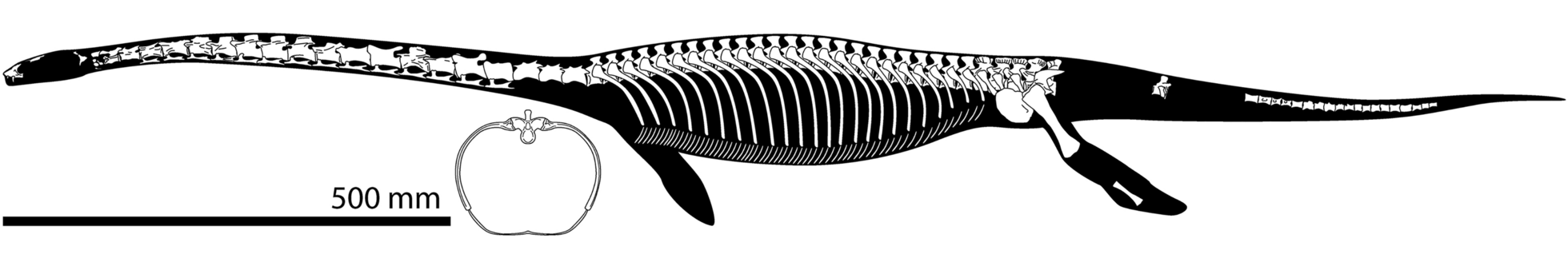
- Reconstructed skeleton of the holotype

Scientific classification
- Kingdom: Animalia
- Phylum: Chordata
- Class: Reptilia
- Family: †Trachelosauridae
- Genus: †Trachelosaurus; Broili & Fischer, 1917
- Species: †T. fischeri

Binomial name
- †Trachelosaurus fischeri Broili & Fischer, 1917

= Trachelosaurus =

Trachelosaurus Temporal range: Early Triassic, 247–242 Ma

Extinct genus of archosauromorph reptiles

Trachelosaurus is an extinct genus of lizard-like early archosauromorph reptiles in the family Trachelosauridae. It was originally described as a dinosaur until it was redescribed as a "protorosaur" reptile by Robert L. Carroll in 1988. The type species, T. fischeri, was described by F. Broili & E. Fischer in 1917 based on remains found in the Solling Formation (Buntsandstein), Bernburg, Germany. A 2024 redescription identified Trachelosaurus as a long-necked and presumably aquatic reptile closely related to Dinocephalosaurus from the Guanling Formation of China.

Size compared to a human

== Classification ==
In their 2024 redescription of Trachelosaurus, Spiekman and colleagues recovered it in a clade with the Chinese Dinocephalosaurus in a clade previously named Dinocephalosauridae in 2021. However, the principle of priority instructs that the name Trachelosauridae, which was first erected as a monotypic clade for Trachelosaurus, should be used instead. The results of their phylogenetic analyses are shown in the cladogram below:

- Tanysauria
  - Jesairosaurus
  - - Trachelosauridae
      - - Austronaga
        - Pectodens
      - - Fuyuansaurus
        - - Trachelosaurus
          - - Gracilicollum
            - Dinocephalosaurus
    - Tanystropheidae
      - Augustaburiania
      - Luxisaurus
      - - - Macrocnemus bassanii
          - - Macrocnemus fuyuanensis
            - Macrocnemus obristi
        - - UFRGS-PV-492-T
          - - Amotosaurus
            - - Langobardisaurus
              - - - Raibliania
                  - Tanystropheus spp.
                - - Sclerostropheus
                  - - Ozimek
                    - Tanytrachelos
