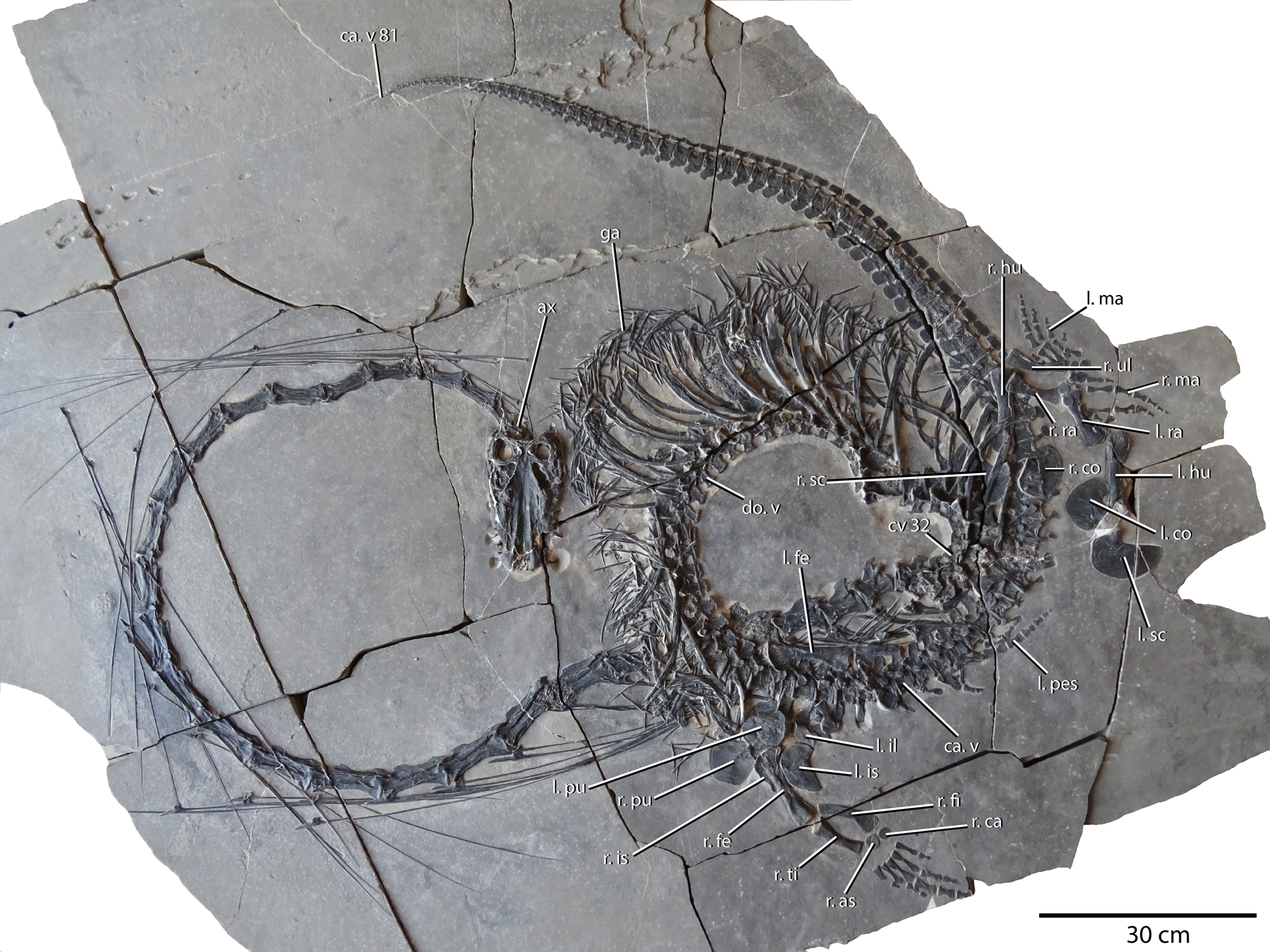
- IVPP V20295, a complete, articulated specimen referred to Dinocephalosaurus orientalis, the type species

Scientific classification
- Kingdom: Animalia
- Phylum: Chordata
- Clade: †Tanysauria
- Family: †Trachelosauridae; Abel, 1919

Genera
- †Austronaga; †Dinocephalosaurus; †Fuyuansaurus?; †Gracilicollum?; †Pectodens; †Protanystropheus; †Trachelosaurus

Synonyms
- Dinocephalosauridae Spiekman, Fraser and Scheyer, 2021

= Trachelosauridae =

Trachelosauridae Temporal range: Triassic, 245–237 Ma

Extinct clade of reptiles

Trachelosauridae (also known as Dinocephalosauridae) is an extinct family of archosauromorph reptiles that lived throughout the Triassic period. Like their close relatives the tanystropheids, they were "protorosaur"-grade archosauromorphs characterized by their long necks. Unlike tanystropheids, which lengthen their neck primarily by elongating the individual cervical (neck) vertebrae, trachelosaurids achieved their long necks by the addition of more vertebrae. The most extreme example of this trend was Dinocephalosaurus, which had at least 32 vertebrae in the neck alone, far more than the 13 neck vertebrae of Tanystropheus.

Trachelosaurids are known from Europe (Poland, Germany, Austria, Netherlands) and China. Some members of the family (i.e. Dinocephalosaurus) were solely marine animals with paddle-like limbs, inhabiting the coastlines of the Tethys Ocean. Dinocephalosaurus was so specialized for aquatic life that it evolved to be viviparous (live-bearing), the only undisputed example of an archosauromorph adapted for live birth. Other members (i.e. Pectodens) were better suited for terrestrial life, suggesting wide ecological diversity in just the few known species in this family.

== Classification ==
Size of several trachelosaurids compared to a human

In 2021, a phylogenetic study was conducted by Spiekman and colleagues to clarify the systematics of "protorosaur" groups. They described the clade Dinocephalosauridae as a node-based clade defined as "Dinocephalosaurus orientalis, Pectodens zhenyuensis, their most recent common ancestor, and all its descendants." The results of one of these analyses with maximum resolution and minimum polytomies, are shown below:

- Diapsida
  - Araeoscelidia
  - Neodiapsida
    - Orovenator
    - - Claudiosaurus
      - - Acerosodontosaurus
        - - Youngina
          - Sauria
            - Lepidosauromorpha
            - Archosauromorpha
              - Jesairosaurus
              - - Protorosaurus
                - - Prolacerta
                  - - - - - Czatkowiella
                          - Sharovipterygidae (Ozimek)
                        - - Fuyuansaurus
                          - Dinocephalosauridae
                            - Protanystropheus
                            - Pectodens
                            - Dinocephalosaurus
                      - Tanystropheidae
                        - - Macrocnemus bassanii
                          - Macrocnemus fuyuanensis
                        - - - Augustaburiania
                            - Amotosaurus
                          - - Langobardisaurus
                            - AMNH FARB 7206
                            - - Sclerostropheus
                              - - Tanystropheus hydroides
                                - GMPKU P 1527 T. cf. hydroides
                                - Tanystropheus longobardicus
                    - Crocopoda
                      - Allokotosauria
                      - - Rhynchosauria
                        - - Teyujagua
                          - Archosauriformes

In 2023, Wang, Lei & Li described Austronaga as a new genus and species of dinocephalosaurid, recovering as the sister taxon to Dinocephalosaurus in a clade also containing Pectodens.

A 2024 redescription of Trachelosaurus by Spiekman et al. determined that it was another member of the family previously given the name Dinocephalosauridae. Trachelosaurus was discovered much earlier than the other members of the family, having been classified within its own monotypic family, Trachelosauridae. The name Trachelosauridae was introduced over a century before Dinocephalosauridae, but both names are now understood to refer to the same family. According to the principle of priority, Dinocephalosauridae would be subsumed as a junior synonym of Trachelosauridae. Spiekman defined Trachelosauridae as "The most inclusive clade containing Trachelosaurus fischeri and Dinocephalosaurus orientalis, but not Tanystropheus longobardicus, Macrocnemus bassanii, Protorosaurus speneri, or Prolacerta broomi. The same study also defined a broader branch-based clade, Tanysauria, to encompass both tanystropheids and trachelosaurids. The results of their phylogenetic analyses are shown in the cladogram below:

- - - Protorosaurus
    - Aenigmastropheus
  - - Crocopoda
    - Tanysauria
      - Jesairosaurus
      - - Trachelosauridae
          - - Austronaga
            - Pectodens
          - - Fuyuansaurus
            - - Trachelosaurus
              - - Gracilicollum
                - Dinocephalosaurus
        - Tanystropheidae
          - Augustaburiania
          - Luxisaurus
          - - - Macrocnemus bassanii
              - - Macrocnemus fuyuanensis
                - Macrocnemus obristi
            - - UFRGS-PV-492-T
              - - Amotosaurus
                - - Langobardisaurus
                  - - - Raibliania
                      - Tanystropheus spp.
                    - - Sclerostropheus
                      - - Ozimek
                        - Tanytrachelos
