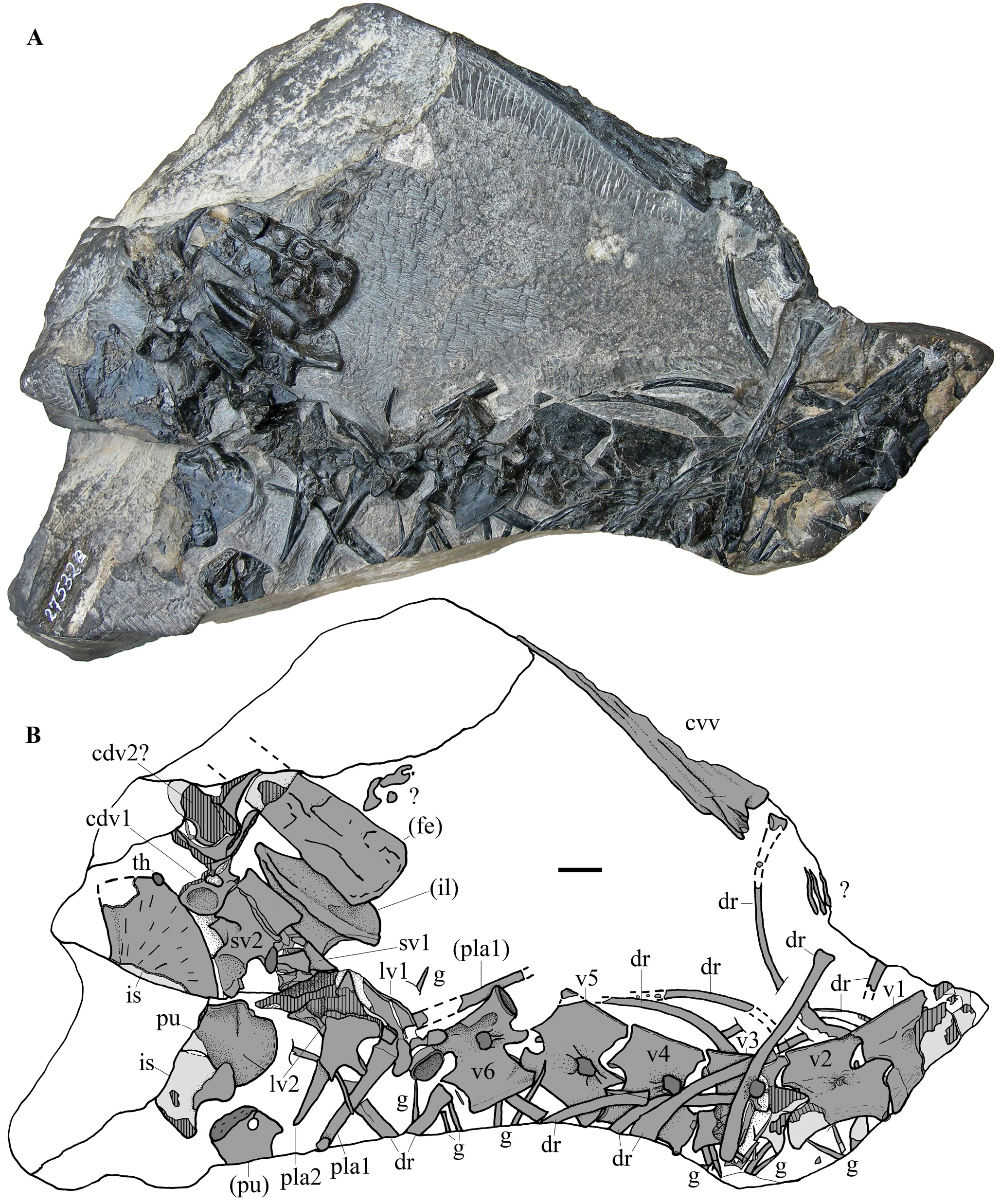
- Photograph of the holotype (top) and line drawing (bottom)

Scientific classification
- Domain: Eukaryota
- Kingdom: Animalia
- Phylum: Chordata
- Class: Reptilia
- Clade: Archosauromorpha
- Family: †Tanystropheidae
- Genus: †Raibliania; Dalla Vecchia, 2020

Type species
- †Raibliania calligarisi Dalla Vecchia, 2020

= Raibliania =

Raibliania Temporal range: Late Triassic, Carnian

Extinct genus of reptiles

Raibliania is an extinct genus of tanystropheid archosauromorph discovered in the Calcare del Predil Formation in Italy. It lived during the Carnian stage of the Late Triassic and it was related to Tanystropheus. Raibliania is distinct from Tanystropheus due to some distinct features of the cervical vertebrae and teeth. The type species is Raibliania calligarisi, named in 2020. The holotype (MFSN 27532) consists of a partial post-cranial skeleton, with the known elements including vertebrae (sacral, cervical and dorsal; sans caudal), a single tooth, several ribs, gastralia and parts of the pelvis (ilium and pubis).

In their 2024 description of Dinocephalosaurus material, Spiekman et al. suggested that the Raibliania fossil material may actually be referrable to Tanystropheus, due to notable similarities between skeletons of the two taxa. The results of their phylogenetic analysis, which included both Raibliania and Tanystropheus spp., are shown in the cladogram below:

- Archosauromorpha
  - Jesairosaurus
  - - Protorosaurus
    - - Prolacerta
      - - Crocopoda
        - - Dinocephalosauridae
          - - Fuyuansaurus
            - Tanystropheidae
              - - Macrocnemus bassanii
                - - Macrocnemus fuyuanensis
                  - - Macrocnemus obristi
                    - Elessaurus
              - - - Amotosaurus
                  - Ozimek
                - - Sclerostropheus
                  - Langobardisaurus
                  - AMNH FARB 7206 (an unnamed Tanytrachelos-like tanystropheid from New Jersey)
                  - Tanytrachelos
                  - Gracilicollum
                  - - Tanystropheus hydroides
                    - GMPKU P 1527 (T. cf. hydroides)
                    - - Tanystropheus longobardicus
                      - Raibliania
