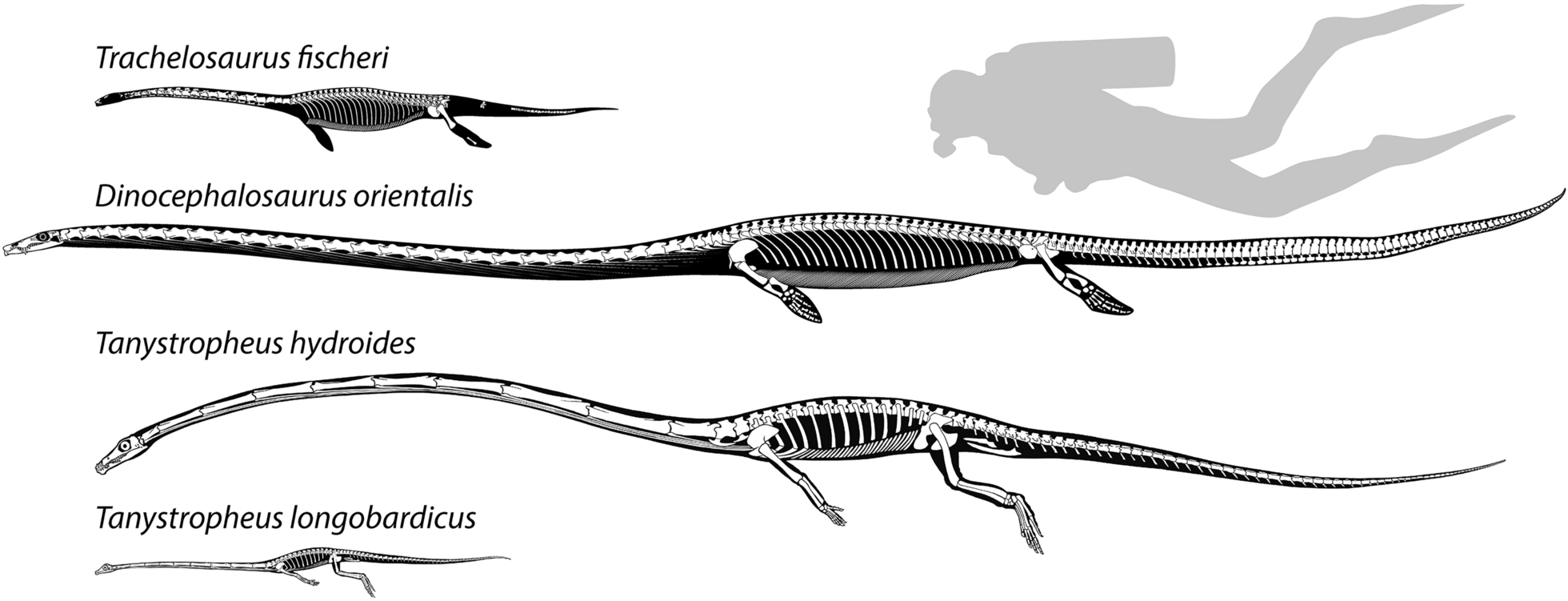
- Skeletal reconstructions of aquatic tanysaurs, from top to bottom: Trachelosaurus and Dinocephalosaurus (Trachelosauridae) and Tanystropheus hydroides and T. longobardicus (Tanystropheidae)
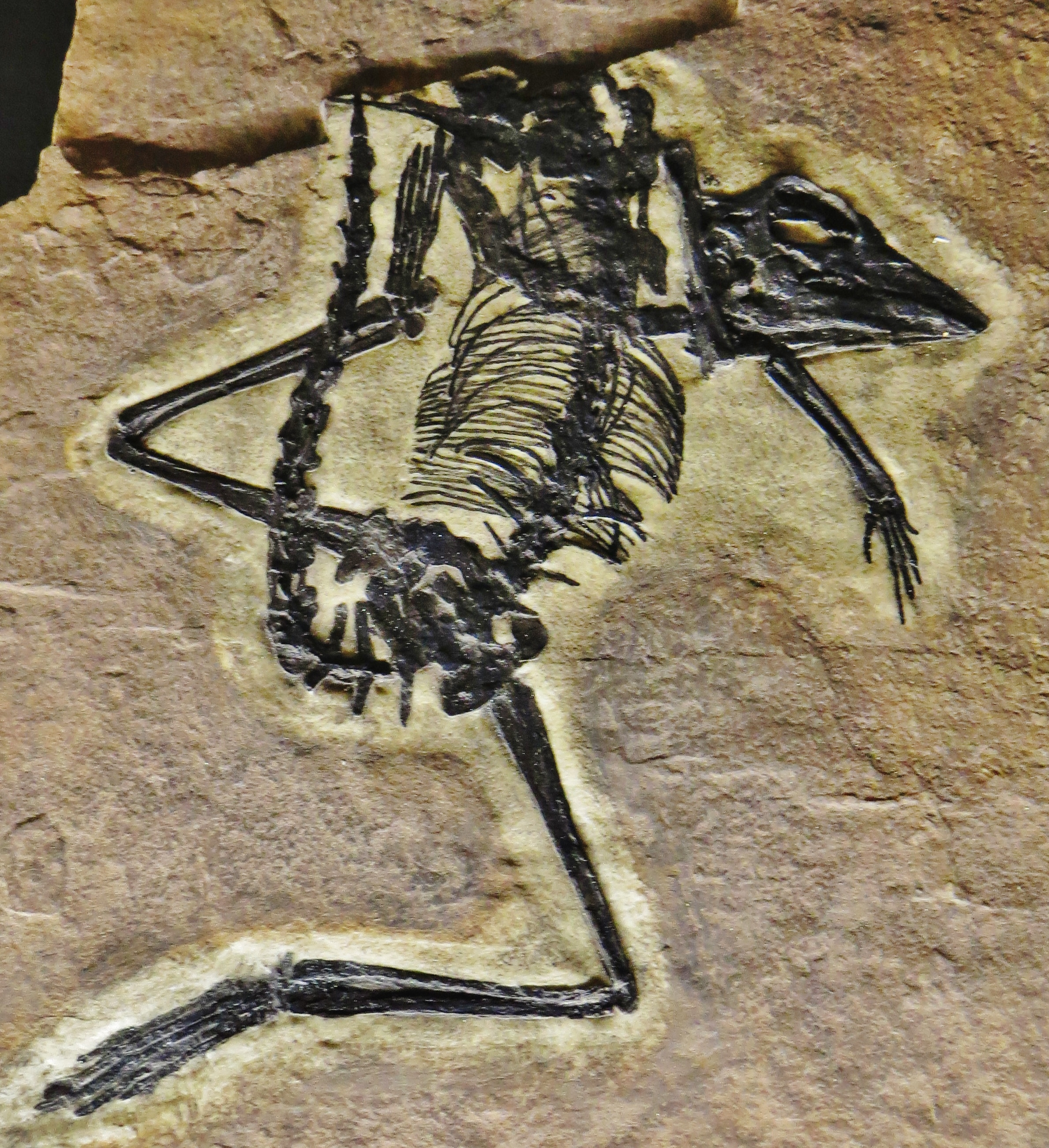
- Fossil of Langobardisaurus, a terrestrial tanystropheid

Scientific classification
- Kingdom: Animalia
- Phylum: Chordata
- Class: Reptilia
- Clade: Archosauromorpha
- Clade: †Tanysauria; Spiekman et al., 2024

Subgroups
- †Tanystropheidae; †Trachelosauridae

= Tanysauria =

Tanysaurians Temporal range: Triassic

Extinct clade of archosauromorph reptiles

Tanysauria (meaning "long lizards") is an extinct clade of long-necked archosauromorph reptiles from the Triassic period of Europe, Asia, North America, and South America. It comprises the families Tanystropheidae and Trachelosauridae (found by the authors to be coextensive with Dinocephalosauridae, and a senior synonym of the latter). Within the Archosauromorpha, Tanysauria represents the sister group to the Crocopoda. It contains many of the species formerly placed in "Protorosauria", which is now thought to be a paraphyletic group.

== Definition ==
The clade Tanysauria was described by Stephan Spiekman and co-authors in 2024. Its name comes from the Greek τᾰνυ [tany] meaning "long" and σαῦρος [sauros] meaning "lizard," which refers to the long necks and, in some cases, bodies of tanysaurians.

According to the phylogenetic definition given by Spiekman et al., the clade Tanysauria includes all taxa that are more closely related to Tanystropheus longobardicus, Dinocephalosaurus orientalis, and Trachelosaurus fischeri than to Protorosaurus speneri, Prolacerta broomi, Mesosuchus browni, Azendohsaurus madagaskarensis, or Proterosuchus fergusi.

== Description and ecology ==
Tanysaurs ancestrally had relatively long necks. Many tanysaurs like Macrocnemus and Pectodens are thought to have been terrestrial, though some lineages of both trachelosaurids and tanystropheids independently evolved adaptations to an aquatic lifestyle, often accompanied by an extreme elongation of the neck.

== Classification ==
In their 2024 redescription of Trachelosaurus, Spiekman and colleagues named Tanysauria as a new clade containing the Tanystropheidae and Trachelosauridae (a senior synonym of Dinocephalosauridae). This clade is the sister taxon to the Crocopoda. The results of their phylogenetic analyses are shown in the cladogram below:

- Archosauromorpha
  - - †Protorosaurus
    - †Aenigmastropheus
  - - Crocopoda
    - †Tanysauria
      - Jesairosaurus
      - - Trachelosauridae
          - - Austronaga
            - Pectodens
          - - Fuyuansaurus
            - - Trachelosaurus
              - - Gracilicollum
                - Dinocephalosaurus
        - Tanystropheidae
          - Augustaburiania
          - Luxisaurus
          - - - Macrocnemus bassanii
              - - Macrocnemus fuyuanensis
                - Macrocnemus obristi
            - - UFRGS-PV-492-T
              - - Amotosaurus
                - - Langobardisaurus
                  - - - Raibliania
                      - Tanystropheus spp.
                    - - Sclerostropheus
                      - - Ozimek
                        - Tanytrachelos
