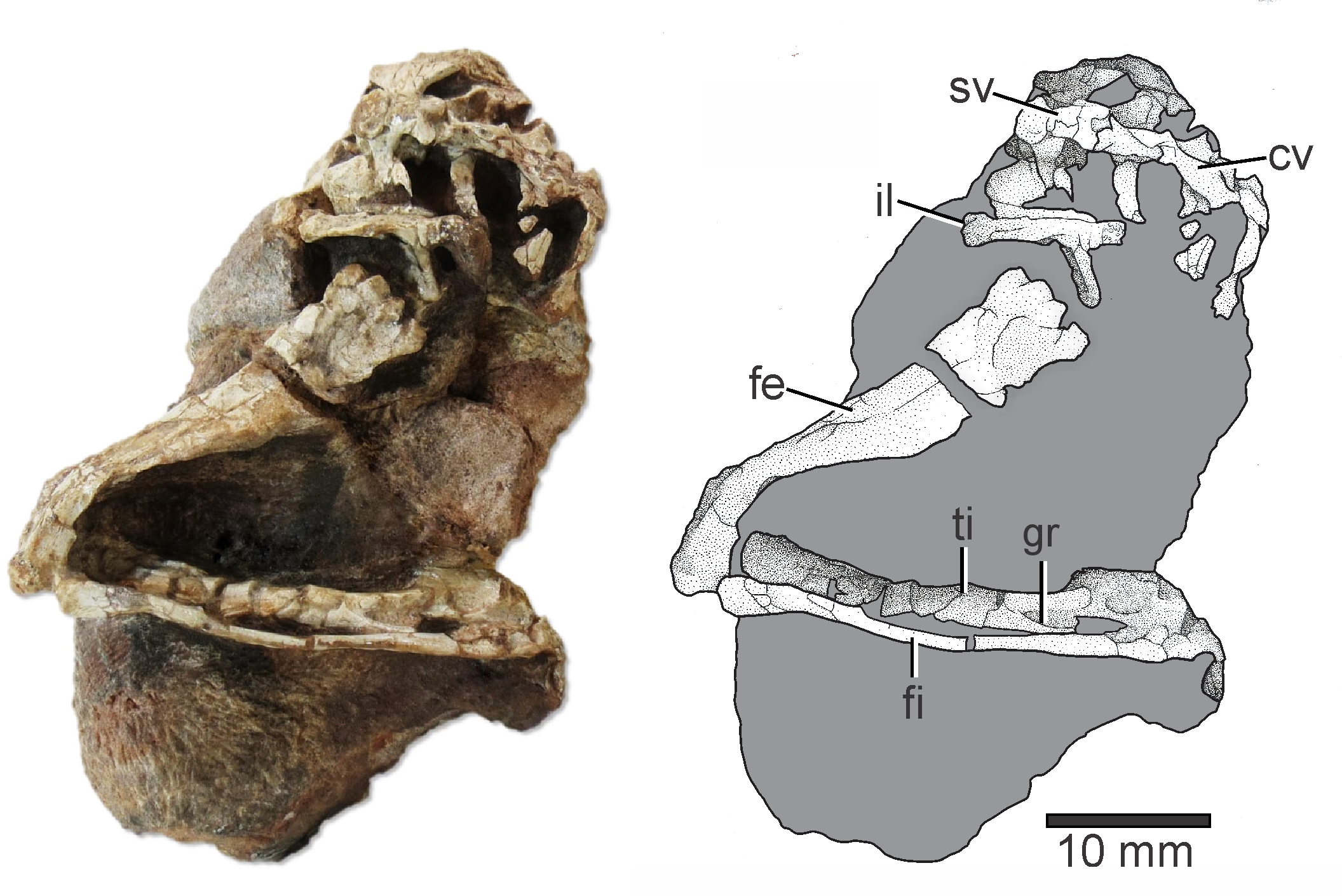
- The holotype specimen, UFSM 11471

Scientific classification
- Kingdom: Animalia
- Phylum: Chordata
- Class: Reptilia
- Clade: Archosauromorpha
- Genus: †Elessaurus; De-Oliveira et al., 2020

Type species
- †Elessaurus gondwanoccidens De-Oliveira et al., 2020

= Elessaurus =

Elessaurus Temporal range: Early Triassic, 251–247 Ma

Extinct genus of reptiles

Elessaurus is an extinct genus of archosauromorph from the Early Triassic of Brazil. It contains a single species, Elessaurus gondwanoccidens. It possessed a variety of features common to basal archosauromorphs, particularly basal tanystropheids such as Macrocnemus. However, it is uncertain whether Elessaurus was a particularly close relative of tanystropheids, and it might instead be closer to other major archosauromorph clades. The genus name refers to "Elessar", an alternate name of the character Aragorn from J.R.R. Tolkien's Lord of the Rings trilogy.

== Discovery ==
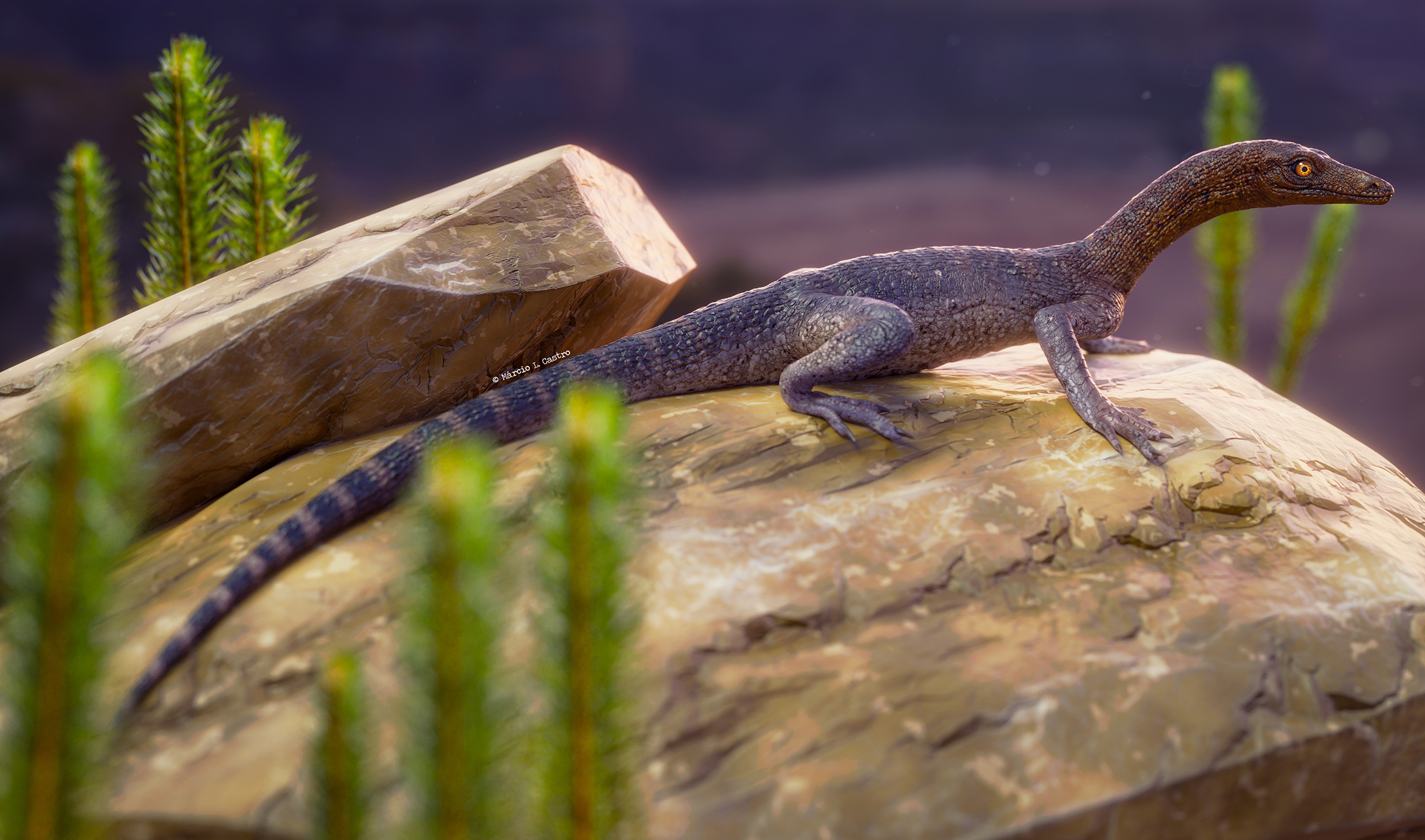
Life restoration by Márcio L. Castro

Elessaurus is known from a single holotype specimen, UFSM 11471, which consists of most of a leg connected to parts of the hip and the base of the tail. Despite being fairly complete by the standards of its locale, many of the specimen's bones are flattened or fragmentary. UFSM 11471 was collected from the Bica São Tomé site, an outcrop of the Sanga do Cabral Formation in Rio Grande do Sul, Brazil. Based on the presence of Procolophon, the Sanga do Cabral Formation is likely Early Triassic (Induan-Olenekian) in age.

The generic name of Elessaurus is derived from the word "Elessar". This word originated from the fictional language of Quenya, which was invented by J.R.R. Tolkien for elves in his Middle Earth series. It translated to "elf-stone", and is one of the many names of the character more well known as Aragorn. Another name of Aragorn is "long-shanks", justifying its connection to Elessaurus, which possessed characteristically elongated shin bones. The specific name translates to "Western Gondwana", the region of the Early Triassic world which is now South America.

== Description ==
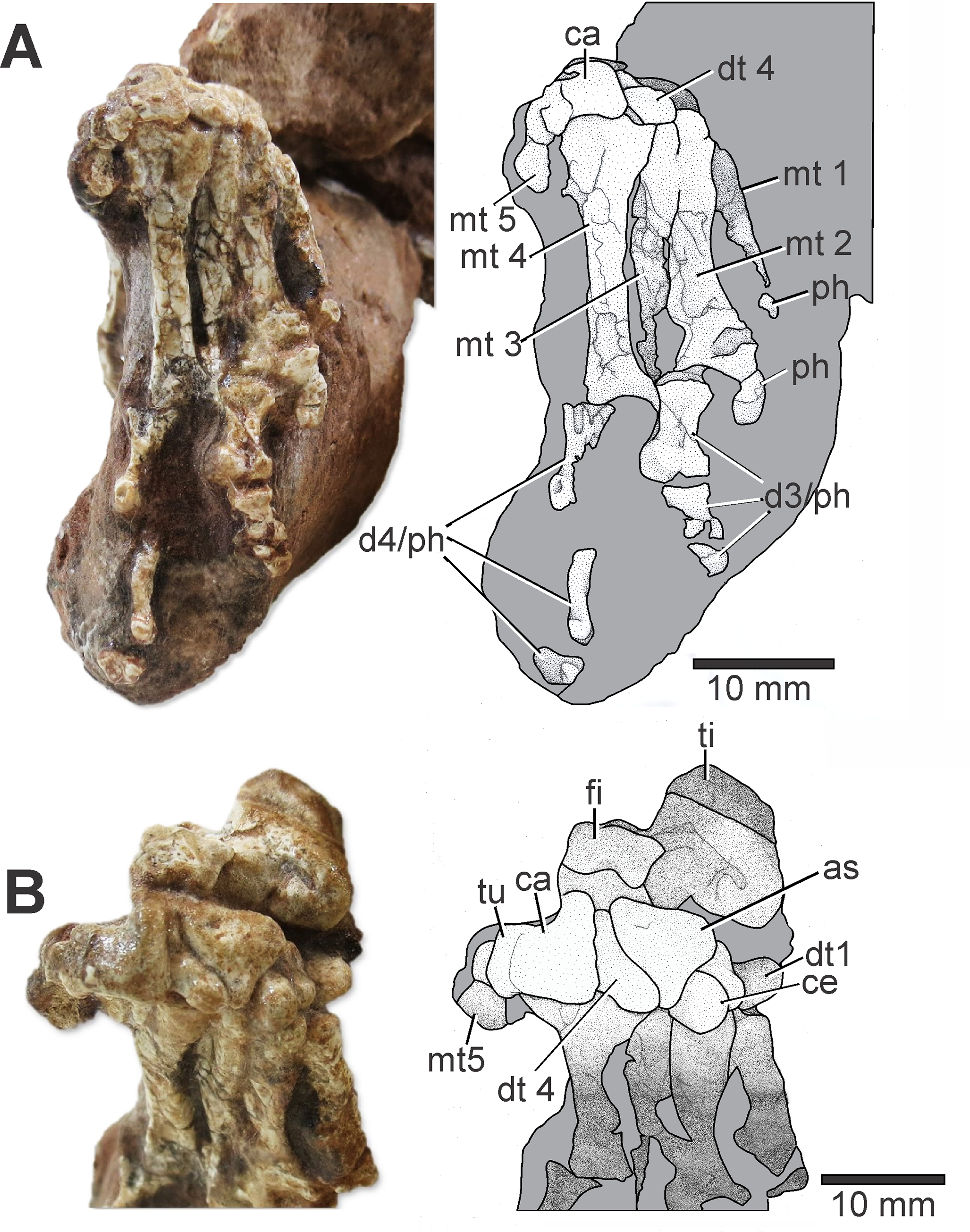
Pes (foot) of Elessaurus seen in plantar view (i.e. looking towards the sole)

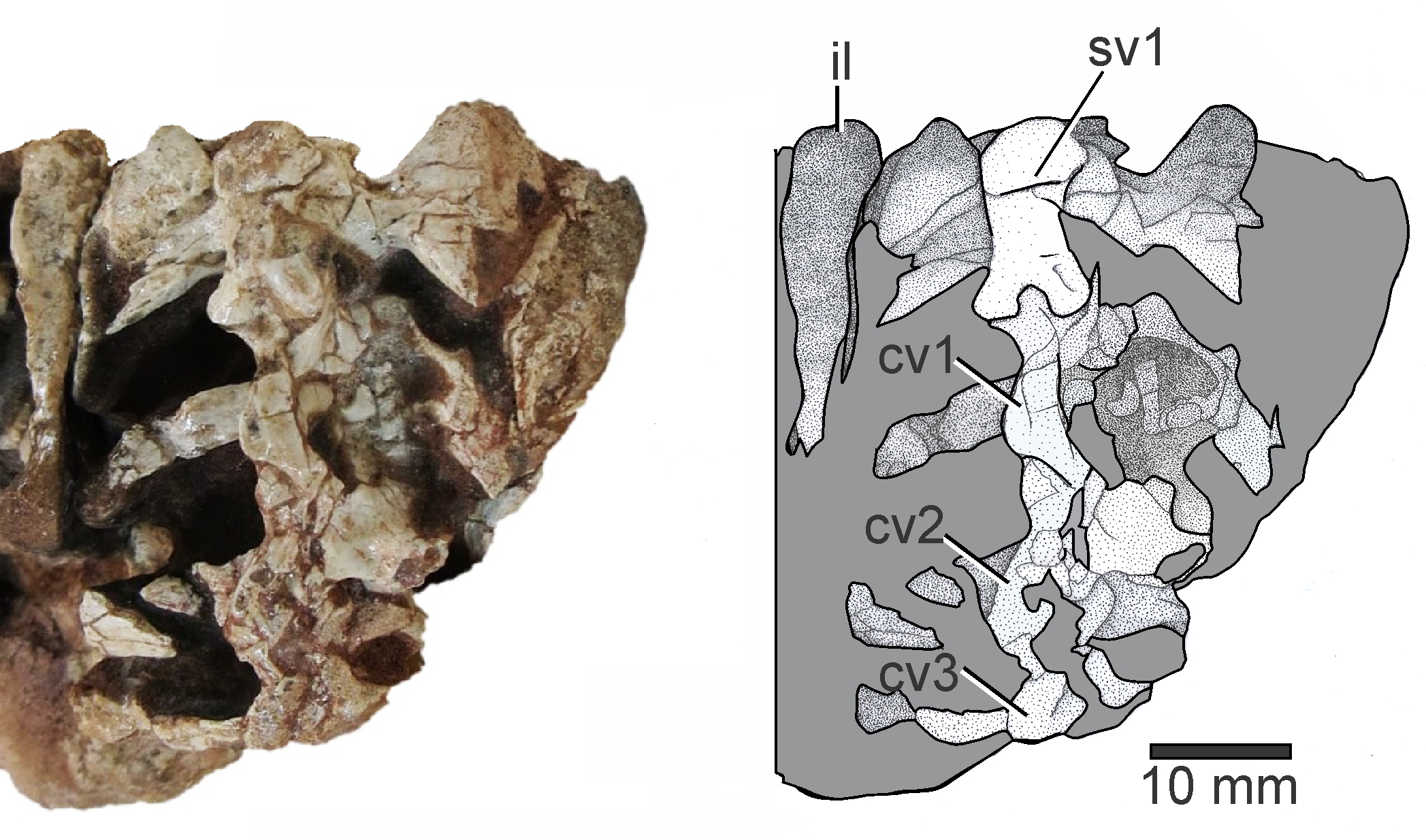
Hip and tail vertebrae of Elessaurus seen from above

The sacral rib of the second sacral (hip) vertebra bifurcates towards its contact with the ilium. Most of this sacral rib has a broad connection with the ilium, but at its rear it sends a pointed prong backwards. This trait is similar to Macrocnemus but unlike other tanystropheids, many of which do not have bifurcating sacral ribs. On the other hand, the caudal (tail) vertebrae resemble Tanystrachelos and Jesairosaurus in possessing transverse processes which project backwards and upwards. The ilium has a straight and blade-like upper edge, a pronounced postacetabular process, and a short yet distinct preacetabular process.

The femur is slender and sigmoid, similar to that of Macrocnemus and Augustaburiania. The femoral head is not distinctly wider than the shaft and its caudofemoralis attachment ridge is in the form of an internal trochanter (like lizards and basal archosauromorphs) rather than a fourth trochanter (which is present in archosauriforms). The femur widens slightly near the knee, where it has a pair of distinct condyles. The tibia and fibula are about 20% longer than the femur, a characteristic which is observed in Macrocnemus as well as avemetatarsalian archosaurs (like pterosaurs and early dinosaurs). The tibia may have a groove on its outer surface near the ankle like proterochampsids, but this may instead be an area of crushed bone. The fibula is thin and has a knob for the iliofibularis muscle near the knee.

The foot is asymmetrical, with the fourth metatarsal being the longest bone in the foot as with most non-archosauriform, non-tanystropheid archosauromorphs. Also like most early archosauromorphs, the fifth metatarsal is a short, hooked, L-shaped bone. The tarsus has six bones: an astragalus, calcaneum, distal tarsals I, III, and IV, and a centrale. This situation mirrors that of Macrocnemus bassannii and non-tanystropheid, non-archosauriform archosauromorphs. There is no foramen (hole) on the suture between the astragalus and calcaneum. The outer surface of calcaneum has an expansion known as a calcaneal tuber. A calcaneal tuber is known in archosauriforms and some allokotosaurs, as well as at least one tanystropheid, Tanytrachelos.

== Paleobiogeography and paleobiology ==
Assuming Elessaurus is a relative of tanystropheids, it may illuminate the early origin of that unusual archosauromorph group. True tanystropheids first appeared in what is now Europe and China, though at the time these areas were northern regions of Pangaea along the margins of the ancient Tethys Ocean. The oldest agreed-upon members of the group lived in Russia (Augustaburiania) and Germany (Amotosaurus). However, recently discovered Early Triassic cervical (neck) vertebrae from the Sanga Do Cabral Formation suggest that tanystropheids were present in southern Pangaea around the same time that they started to become common in the north. There is no conclusive evidence that Elessaurus is the same animal as the Sanga Do Cabral tanystropheid, but even if this is not the case it may still support the hypothesis that tanystropheids and their kin had an early southern diversity rivaling their northern diversity. It also suggests that tanystropheids may have originated in Gondwana (southern Pangaea) rather than Laurasia (northern Pangaea).

Elessaurus is construed to be a mostly terrestrial animal based on its hip and foot resembling Macrocnemus and other typical basal archosauromorphs. It does not possess any of the unusual characteristics of Tanystropheus, a large and specialized tanystropheid which has been argued to be semi-aquatic. Nor does it resemble Dinocephalosaurus, a possible tanystropheid which is even more adapted for aquatic life. If Elessaurus is considered an analogue for the origin of Tanystropheidae, the family was seemingly originally composed of terrestrial reptiles, with later semi-aquatic experimentation only evolving afterwards. Elessaurus is also notable among tanystropheids and their potential relatives due to hailing from a landlocked environment dominated by high-energy streams, rather than coastal swamps or beaches.

== Classification ==
De-Oliveira et al. (2020) tested the affinities of Elessaurus by adding it to a phylogenetic analysis previously created by Pritchard et al. (2018). It was resolved as the sister taxon to Tanystropheidae in this first addition. The authors then added Jesairosaurus and Dinocephalosaurus to the analysis, since previous studies have suggested that they may be close to or within Tanystropheidae. However, resulting cladograms instead placed those two taxa together in a clade separate from all other archosauromorphs. Their addition had several impacts on the rest of Archosauromorpha; the structure of Rhynchosauria became unstable and Elessaurus was found to occupy a variety of equally parsimonious positions. These include positions as a basal rhynchosaur, a basal archosauriform, or an independent branch close to allokotosaurs and archosauriforms.
