= Gwyneddosaurus =

Gwyneddosaurus Temporal range: Late Triassic, Norian

Scientific classification
- Domain: Eukaryota
- Kingdom: Animalia
- Phylum: Chordata
- Class: Reptilia
- Clade: Archosauromorpha
- Clade: †Tanysauria
- Family: †Tanystropheidae
- Genus: †Gwyneddosaurus; Bock, 1945
- Species: †G. erici

Binomial name
- †Gwyneddosaurus erici Bock, 1945

Extinct genus of reptiles

Gwyneddosaurus is a possibly invalid genus of extinct aquatic tanystropheid reptile. The type species, G. erici was described in 1945 by Wilhelm Bock, who identified it as a coelurosaurian dinosaur related to Podokesaurus (at the time, "podokesaurids" were thought to be coelurosaurians). Its remains were found in the Upper Triassic Lockatong Formation of Montgomery County, eastern Pennsylvania, and the holotype includes skull fragments, several vertebra, ribs, gastralia, partial shoulder and hip bones, and several forelimb and hindlimb elements found in soft shale, while the paratype includes a femur and a tibia. The type specimen is ANSP 15072 and it was discovered by Bock's four-year-old son while the paratype is only listed as ?(ASNP coll.). It was not a large animal; the type skeleton was estimated by Bock as 18 centimetres (7.1 in) long, and its thigh bone was only 23 millimeters long (0.91 in).

Friedrich von Huene assigned the animal to Protorosauria in 1948 as the smallest known member of the group, finding it to be most like Macrocnemus. Steel (1970) classified it as a theropod dinosaur, whereas Olsen and Baird (1986) identified it as a chimera of mixed remains from a coelacanth and possibly the tanystropheid Tanytrachelos; Olsen and Flynn (1989) later modified this interpretation, describing the type specimen of Gwyneddosaurus as a "gastric ejection" (regurgitation) composed of Tanytrachelos bones and possibly scraps of a coelacanth. They noted that this would make Gwyneddosaurus a senior synonym of Tanytrachelos, and recommended conserving the younger but better-represented genus.
