= Simonettoia =

Simonettoia Temporal range: Late Triassic, mid-upper Norian
- Holotype specimen

Scientific classification
- Kingdom: Animalia
- Phylum: Chordata
- Class: Reptilia
- Clade: Archosauromorpha
- Clade: †Tanysauria
- Family: †Tanystropheidae
- Genus: †Simonettoia; Renesto et al., 2026
- Species: †S. tilaventina

Binomial name
- †Simonettoia tilaventina Renesto et al., 2026

Genus of tanystropheid reptile

Simonettoia is an extinct genus of archosauromorph reptile in the family Tanystropheidae, known from the Late Triassic (Norian age) Forni Dolostone of Italy. The genus contains a single species, Simonettoia tilaventina, known from a partial articulated skeleton. It is most similar to the contemporary Langobardisaurus, but differs from it in the vertebral structure and limb proportions.

== Discovery and naming ==
S. tilaventina type locality (3) in the Forni Dolostone

The Simonettoia fossil material was discovered by R. Rigo at some point prior to 2006 in outcrops of the Forni Dolostone near the confluence of the Forchiar Brook with the Tagliamento River. This site is located near the town of Villa Santina in Udine Province, northeastern Italy. The specimen is housed in the Museo Friulano di Storia Naturale (MFSN) in Udine, where it is permanently accessioned as specimen MFSN 24992. It consists of a partial, neatly articulated skeleton, preserved on a slab and counterslab of dolostone. Most of the skeleton is visible in dorsal (top) view. Much of the vertebral column (neck, trunk, and tail), ribs, left forelimb and hindlimb, pelvis, and pectoral girdle are exposed. The skull, right limbs, and at least the ends of the neck and tail are not visible; they may be contained within the block, but the fragile nature of the bones prevented further preparation, and the similar bone–rock density precluded investigation via CT scanning. The specimen was briefly mentioned in four reports beginning in 2006, where it was referred to as a juvenile specimen of Langobardisaurus, another tanystropheid known from the Forni Dolostone.

In 2026, Silvio Renesto and colleagues described Simonettoia tilaventina as a new genus and species of tanystropheid based on these fossil remains, designating MFSN 24992 as the holotype specimen. The generic name, Simonettoia, honors Luca Simonetto, a MFSN employee who died about three years prior. The specific name, tilaventina, is derived from the Tilaventus, the Latin name for the Tagliamento, near where the only known specimen was found.
