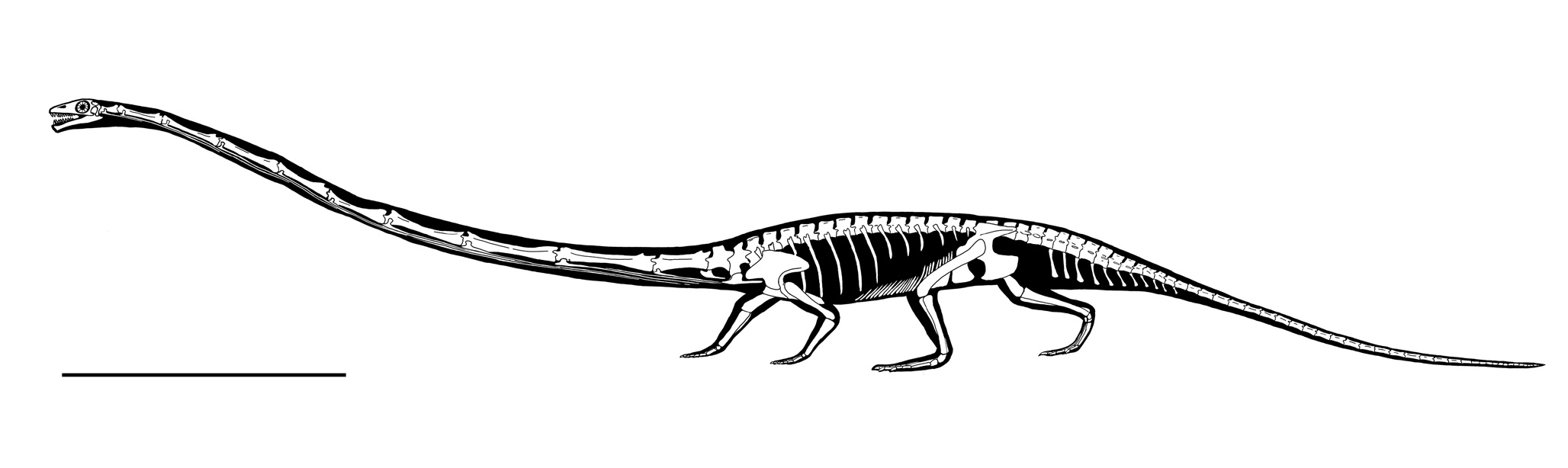
- Skeletal reconstruction of Tanystropheus longobardicus
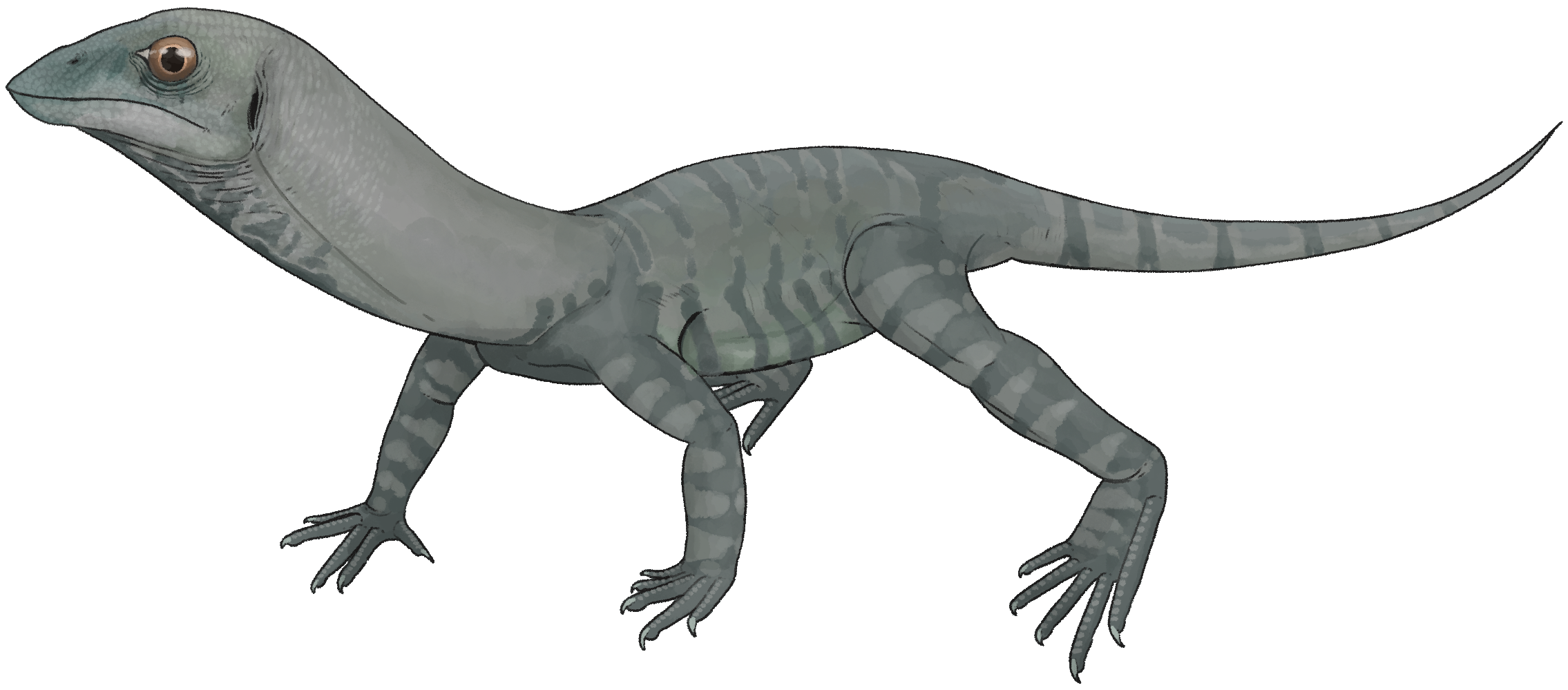
- Life restoration of Langobardisaurus

Scientific classification
- Kingdom: Animalia
- Phylum: Chordata
- Class: Reptilia
- Clade: Archosauromorpha
- Clade: †Tanysauria
- Family: †Tanystropheidae; Gervais, 1858

Genera
- See text

= Tanystropheidae =

Tanystropheidae Temporal range: Triassic, 247.2–201 Ma

Extinct family of reptiles

Tanystropheidae is an extinct family of archosauromorph reptiles that lived throughout the Triassic Period, often considered to be "protorosaurs". They are characterized by their long, stiff necks formed from elongated cervical vertebrae with very long cervical ribs. Members of the group include both terrestrial and aquatic forms. While some tanystropheids were small lizard-like animals, other tanystropheids such as Tanystropheus were large animals that had necks that were several meters long, longer than the rest of their bodies.

Tanystropheids are known from Europe, Asia (Russia, China, and Saudi Arabia), North America and probably South America (Brazil). The presence of tanystropheids in Europe and China indicate that they lived along much of the coastline of the Tethys Ocean. However, species in western North America are found in terrestrial deposits, suggesting that as a group, tanystropheids were ecologically diverse.

Relationships among tanystropheid species have been difficult to resolve because most specimens were flattened during fossilization and are preserved two-dimensionally. Three-dimensional fossils are known from Europe and North America.

== List of genera ==
- †Akidostropheus
- †Amotosaurus
- †Augustaburiania
- †Cosesaurus
- †Elessaurus?
- †Exilisuchus?
- †Gracilicollum?
- †Gwyneddosaurus
- †Langobardisaurus
- †Luxisaurus
- †Macrocnemus
- †Ozimek?
- †Raibliania
- †Sclerostropheus?
- †Sharovipteryx?
- †Simonettoia
- †Tanystropheus
- †Tanytrachelos

== Phylogeny ==
In 2021, a phylogenetic study was conducted by S. Spiekman, N. Fraser, and T. Scheyer in an attempt to clarify the systematics of "protorosaur" groups. A total of 16 individual trees were found using different character scoring methods and unstable OTU exclusions. The following cladogram shows the results of analysis 3A. In this analysis, ratio and ordered characters are treated as such, and 5 out of 40 OTUs (Macrocnemus obristi, Elessaurus gondwanoccidens, Tanytrachelos ahynis, Tanystropheus "conspicuus", and Raibliania calligarisi) are pruned after the analysis to minimize polytomies:

- Archosauromorpha
  - Jesairosaurus
  - - Protorosaurus
    - - Prolacerta
      - - - - - Czatkowiella
              - Sharovipterygidae (Ozimek volans)
            - - Fuyuansaurus
              - Dinocephalosauridae
                - Protanystropheus
                - Pectodens
                - Dinocephalosaurus
          - Tanystropheidae
            - - Macrocnemus bassanii
              - Macrocnemus fuyuanensis
            - - - Augustaburiania
                - Amotosaurus
              - - Langobardisaurus
                - AMNH FARB 7206
                - - Sclerostropheus
                  - - Tanystropheus hydroides
                    - GMPKU P 1527 T. cf. hydroides
                    - Tanystropheus longobardicus
        - Crocopoda
          - Allokotosauria
          - - Rhynchosauria
            - - Teyujagua
              - Archosauriformes

A later 2024 study grouped Tanystropheidae along with Trachelosauridae (Dinocephalosauridae) in the new broader branch-based clade, Tanysauria. The results of their phylogenetic analyses are shown in the cladogram below:

- - - Protorosaurus
    - Aenigmastropheus
  - - Crocopoda
    - Tanysauria
      - Jesairosaurus
      - - Trachelosauridae
          - - Austronaga
            - Pectodens
          - - Fuyuansaurus
            - - Trachelosaurus
              - - Gracilicollum
                - Dinocephalosaurus
        - Tanystropheidae
          - Augustaburiania
          - Luxisaurus
          - - - Macrocnemus bassanii
              - - Macrocnemus fuyuanensis
                - Macrocnemus obristi
            - - UFRGS-PV-492-T
              - - Amotosaurus
                - - Langobardisaurus
                  - - - Raibliania
                      - Tanystropheus spp.
                    - - Sclerostropheus
                      - - Ozimek
                        - Tanytrachelos
