= Protanystropheus =

Protanystropheus Temporal range: Middle Triassic, 245–237 Ma
- Size compared to a human

Scientific classification
- Kingdom: Animalia
- Phylum: Chordata
- Class: Reptilia
- Clade: †Tanysauria
- Family: †Trachelosauridae
- Genus: †Protanystropheus; Sennikov, 2011

Type species
- †Protanystropheus antiquus (Huene, 1908) [originally Tanystropheus antiquus]

Synonyms
- ?Thecodontosaurus primus Huene, 1908

Extinct genus of reptiles

Protanystropheus is an extinct genus of archosauromorph from the Middle Triassic (Anisian stage) of Poland, Germany, Austria and the Netherlands. It was named by Sennikov in 2011 and the type species is Protanystropheus antiquus, first described in 1908 by German paleontologist Friedrich von Huene under the name Tanystropheus antiquus (some authors still prefer to include this species within Tanystropheus). Sennikov (2011) referred to Protanystropheus several vertebrae, including those belonging to "Thecodontosaurus" primus, but such a referral has later been questioned, because these specimens may represent other basal archosauromorphs.

Phylogenetic analyses by Spiekman et al. (2021) found that "Tanystropheus" antiquus was more closely related to Dinocephalosaurus than Tanystropheus. The new clade encompassing taxa near Dinocephalosaurus was named Dinocephalosauridae. In 2024 it was renamed to Trachelosauridae with the realization that the historical taxon Trachelosaurus was also a member of the group.
