= Exilisuchus =

Exilisuchus Temporal range: Early Triassic, 245 Ma

Scientific classification
- Kingdom: Animalia
- Phylum: Chordata
- Class: Reptilia
- Clade: Archelosauria
- Clade: Archosauromorpha
- Genus: †Exilisuchus; Ochev, 1979

Species
- †E. tubercularis Ochev, 1979 (type)

Extinct genus of reptiles

Exilisuchus is an extinct genus of archosauromorph reptile from the Early Triassic of Russia. The type species E. tubercularis was named in 1979. Fossils are known from two Russian assemblages, the Benthosuchus - Thoosuchus assemblage and the Angusaurus assemblage. Both are Olenekian in age. Although initially believed to be a proterosuchid archosauriform, a 2016 analysis found that it also shared features with tanystropheids, and thus is currently classified as Archosauromorpha incertae sedis. Due to the small amount of preserved material, this genus is sometimes considered a nomen dubium.
