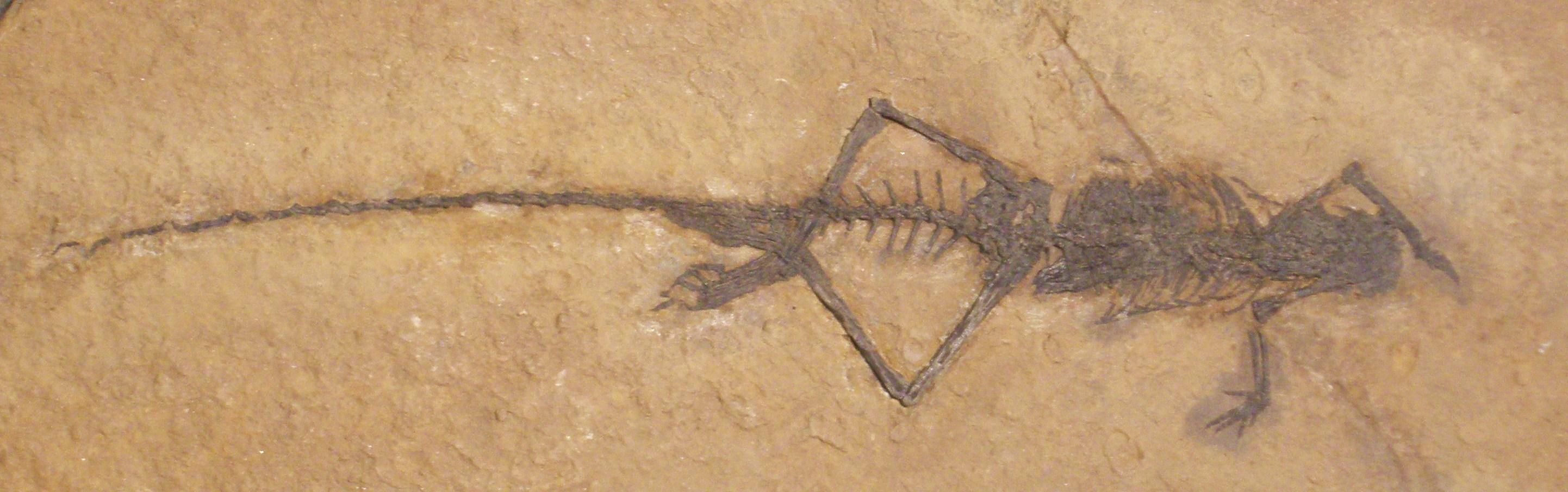
- L. pandolfii specimen MCSNB 4860

Scientific classification
- Kingdom: Animalia
- Phylum: Chordata
- Class: Reptilia
- Family: †Tanystropheidae
- Genus: †Langobardisaurus; Renesto, 1994

Type species
- †Langobardisaurus pandolfii Renesto, 1994

Synonyms
- L. tonelloi Muscio, 1997

= Langobardisaurus =

Langobardisaurus Temporal range: Late Triassic, Norian

Extinct genus of reptiles

Langobardisaurus (/ˈlæŋɡoʊbɑːrdɪˈsɔːrəs/, meaning Reptile of Langobardi, in reference to the Long Bearded People, an ancient Central-European civilisation of North Germanic origin) is an extinct genus of tanystropheid archosauromorph reptile, with one valid species, L. pandolfii. Its fossils have been found in Italy and Austria, and it lived during the Late Triassic period, roughly 228 to 201 million years ago. Langobardisaurus was initially described in 1994, based on fossils from the Calcare di Zorzino Formation in Northern Italy. Fossils of the genus are also known from the Forni Dolostone of Northern Italy and the Seefeld Formation of Austria.

== Discovery ==
To date, five specimens of Langobardisaurus have been found.

=== Calcare di Zorzino specimens ===
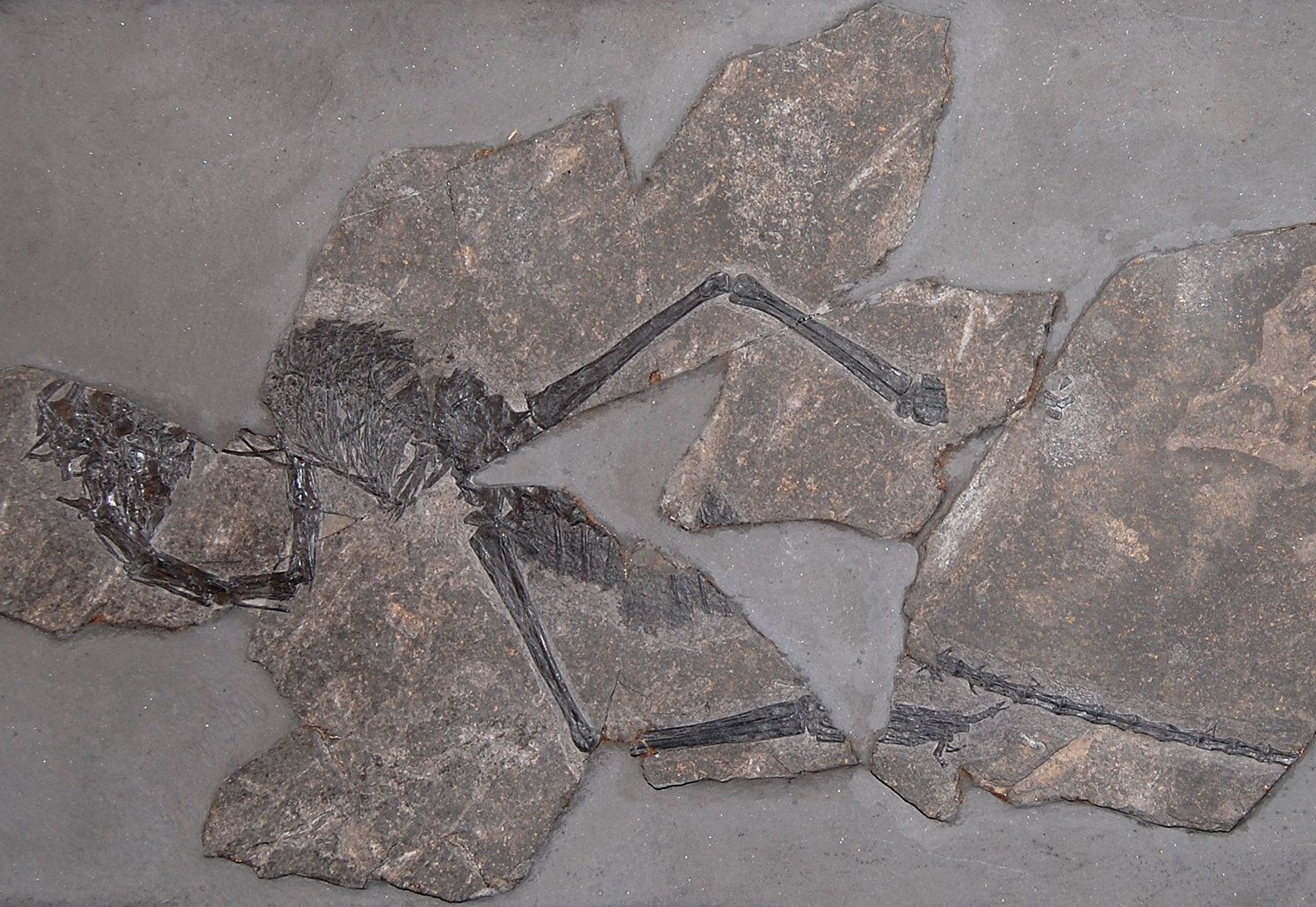
The holotype of L. pandolfii, specimen MCSNB 2883

The first fossils of the genus were discovered in 1974 at a quarry in Cene, Lombardy exposing the Calcare di Zorzino (Zorzino Limestone). This formation has produced two specimens, both of which are flattened but articulated skeletons exposed in ventral view (belly side up). They were initially described in 1994 by Italian paleontologist Silvio Renesto. The holotype specimen of L. pandolfii, MCSNB 2883, is an incomplete skeleton missing portions of the tail and forelimbs, while the neck and skull are crushed and displaced to the side.

The smaller second specimen, MCSNB 4860, is a probable juvenile, with its skull and neck bent fully backwards under the rib cage. Both specimens are stored at the Museo civico di scienze naturali di Bergamo "E. Caffi" (MCSNB), a natural history museum in Bergamo.

=== Dolomia di Forni specimens ===
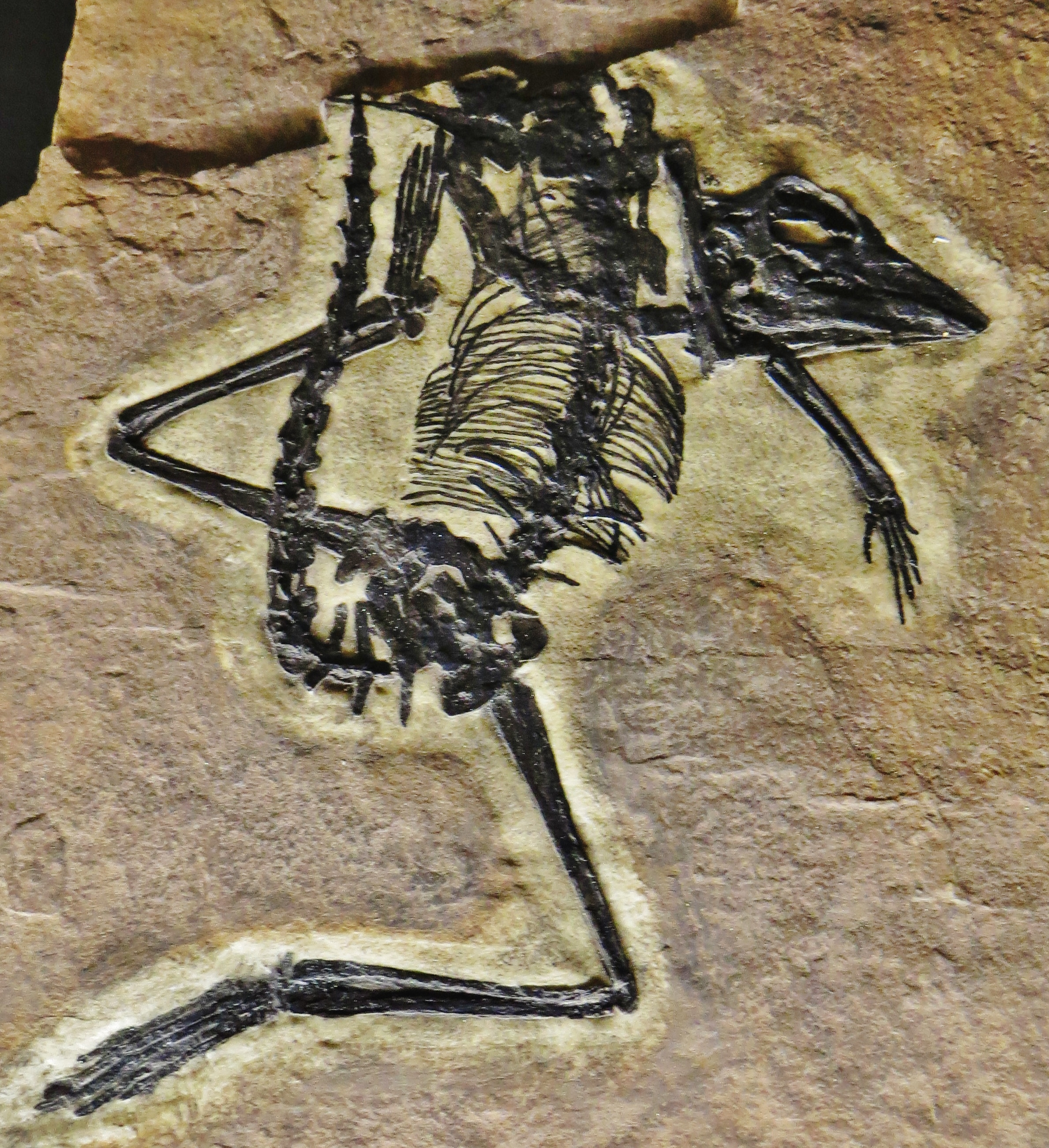
Specimen MFSN 1921, originally named as the holotype of "L. tonelloi" and currently referred to L. pandolfii

Two additional Italian specimens were later discovered in the Dolomia di Forni (Forni Dolostone) in the Friuli-Venezia Giulia region of Northern Italy. One of the Forni specimens, MFSN 1921, is the most complete and well-preserved skeleton in the genus. It was originally described as a new species, Langobardisaurus tonelloi, by Muscio (1997). This was justified by apparent differences in phalangeal formula and limb bone proportion, though reinvestigation of these features has rendered them to be taxonomically insignificant. L. tonelloi is thus considered synonymous with L. pandolfii. The second Forni specimen, MFSN 26829, is much less complete, consisting of partial hindlimbs with associated tail and hip material. The Forni specimens are stored at the Museo Friulano di Storia Naturale (MFSN) in Udine.

Bizzarini and Muscio (1995) proposed a third species, Langobardisaurus rossii, based on a skeleton from the Dolomia di Forni, MCSN 19235. However, a detailed review of the specimen by Renesto and Dalla Vecchia in 2007 led them to conclude that the Langobardisaurus rossii was not actually referrable to the genus. Instead it was a fossil of an indeterminate lepidosauromorph, likely a rhynchocephalian.

=== Austrian specimen ===
The most recent specimen of Langobardisaurus was described in 2013 from a fossil found in the Seefeld Formation in the Northern Calcareous Alps of Tyrol Austria. The Austrian specimen, P 10121, is an impression of a small nearly complete skeleton, close in size to MCSNB 4860. This finding is significant as it expands the paleontological range of the genus, which was previously confined to Northern Italy. Saller et al. (2013) described the geological setting as "dark limestone and dolomite that formed in relatively small and deep marine basins surrounded by a shallow-water carbonate platform on which the peritidal sediments forming the Dolomia Principale/Hauptdolomit Formation were deposited". The aforementioned basins lacked water circulation and ranged from insignificant oxygen levels to totally anoxic - making this environment suitable for preservation of vertebrate bones.

== Description ==
=== Neck and skull ===
Size comparison

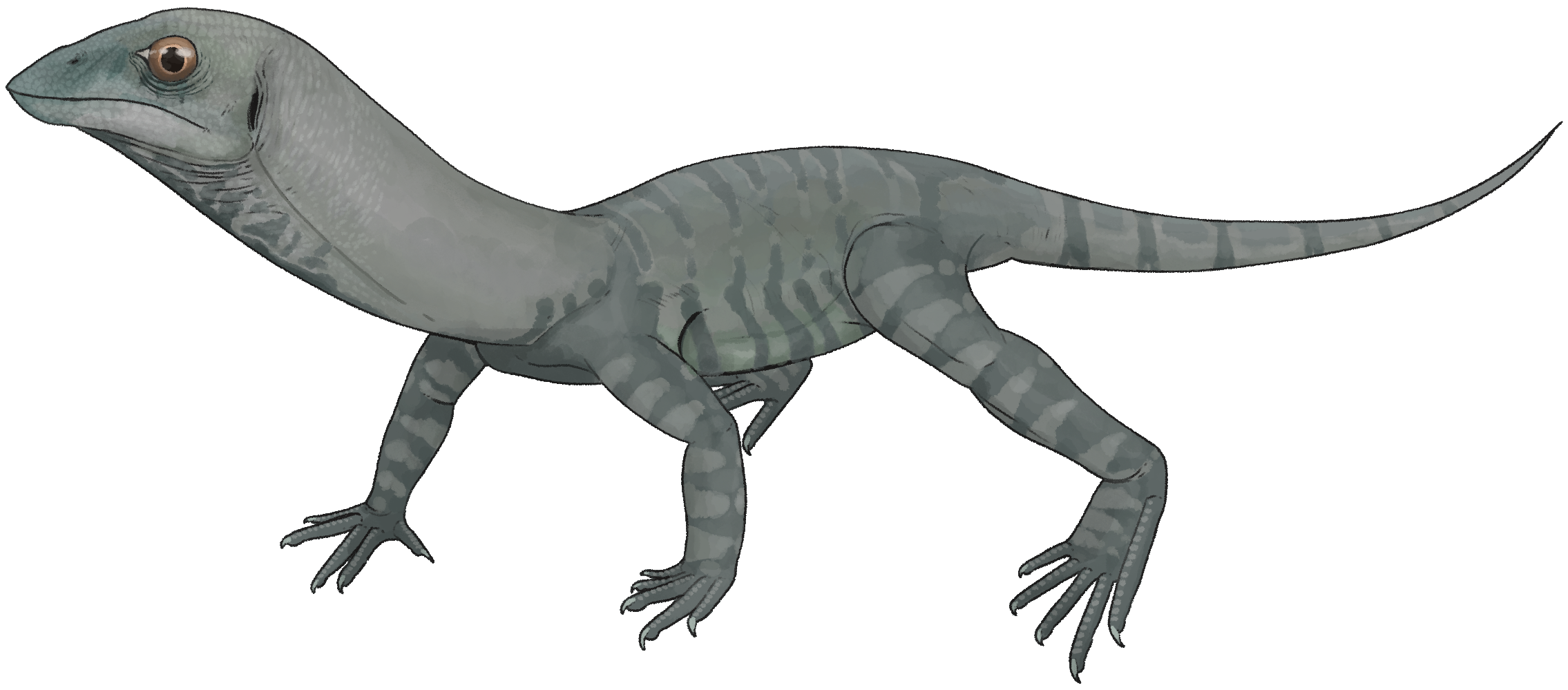
Life restoration

Langobardisaurus was a small reptile with a body size shorter than 50 cm. Despite its small size, Langobardisaurus featured a long neck with elongate cervical vertebrae featuring low neural spines. Atop its long neck, Langobardisaurus had a large yet short triangular skull that featured a small rostrum and large orbits. Its large orbits are evidence of reliance on visual perception – this suggests that Langobardisaurus likely had good eyesight. The skull morphology of Langobardisaurus reflects its unique pattern of dentition. The front part of the upper jaw is toothless, although some grooves on the premaxilla have been mistaken to be teeth in the past despite their lack of enamel. Past this toothless region of the snout, there were larger tricuspid (three-pronged) cheek teeth on the maxilla and a large molariform tooth which is elongated in an anteroposterior (front-to-back) direction. This molariform tooth is flattened, with its occluding surface bent inwards and covered with tiny denticles.

Skull diagram

The lower jaw featured a similar molariform tooth which occluded with the aforementioned upper counterpart. Additionally, the lower jaw was robust and had a high coronoid process which suggests that the capability of a powerful bite. Given this and its distinct tooth pattern, these traits suggest that Langobardisaurus performed excessive grinding of its food. However, none of the discovered specimens included the jaw articulation, so the conclusions that can be drawn are limited. A dentition pattern as described is certainly unique, and not found in any other 'protorosaur'. In an analysis of Langobardisaurus jaw and teeth morphology, Renesto and Dalla Vecchia speculated that the Langobardisaurus survived on a diet of large insects, crustaceans, and small fish with tough scales. Additionally, it has been hypothesized that Langobardisaurus used its long neck to pluck insects out of the air, in addition to burying its head deep into burrows to capture fleeing crustacean prey.

=== Tail ===
The long neck was opposed by an even longer tail, which featured 45 caudal vertebrae – making it twice the length of the trunk. Paleontologists hypothesize that the long tail of Langobardisaurus was a key adaptation for the genus that had significant impacts on its daily activity. A long tail allowed the Langobardisaurus to balance its body in a bipedal stance, despite its long neck. Able to stand tall on its hind legs, Langobardisaurus could have utilized its keen eyesight and long neck (extended vertically) to survey nearby terrain for both predators and prey.

=== Limbs ===
Langobardisaurus featured short forelimbs dwarfed by much longer, hollow hind limbs. The tibia and fibula elements were slightly shorter than the femur. Moving distally, the tarsi were small and compact. These facts suggest that Langobardisaurus was capable of bipedal locomotion. Bipedal locomotion was undoubtedly a large advantage for Langobardisaurus - such an adaptation would have allowed the animal to both chase after prey and run from predators. Based on the hypothesis that Langobardisaurus fed on insects, crustaceans, and fish, the ability to run after prey afforded Langobardisaurus a significant increase in its hunting capabilities, even if it was only able to run in short bursts. Based on the available morphological and geological information on the genus, paleontologists hypothesize that the Langobardisaurus likely lived near marine environments - consistent with the proposition that it survived off of crustaceans found in tidal flats. The Late Triassic topographical features of the regions in which the specimens were found further support this claim

== Classification ==
Langobardisaurus is a member of the Tanystropheidae, and is considered to be a close relative of Tanystropheus and Macrocnemus, which are also known from Triassic deposits of Italy (albeit from the Middle Triassic). Tanystropheids are classified as archosauromorph diapsids. They have often been grouped with Protorosaurus and other long-necked early archosauromorphs in a group called Protorosauria. Some authors have suggested that "protorosaurs" are an unnatural grouping rather than a clade. If this is the case, tanystropheids may not be closely related to Protorosaurus.

Spiekman, Fraser & Schayer (2021) analyzed the systematics of "protorosaur" groups in their phylogenetic analyses. The following cladogram shows the structure of Tanystropheidae according to one analysis, with ratio and ordered characters treated as such and pruning 5 out of 40 OTUs a posteriori to offer maximum resolution/minimum polytomies:

- Tanystropheidae
  - - Macrocnemus bassanii
    - Macrocnemus fuyuanensis
  - - - Augustaburiania
      - Amotosaurus
    - - Langobardisaurus
      - AMNH FARB 7206
      - - Sclerostropheus
        - - Tanystropheus hydroides
          - GMPKU P 1527 T. cf. hydroides
          - Tanystropheus longobardicus
