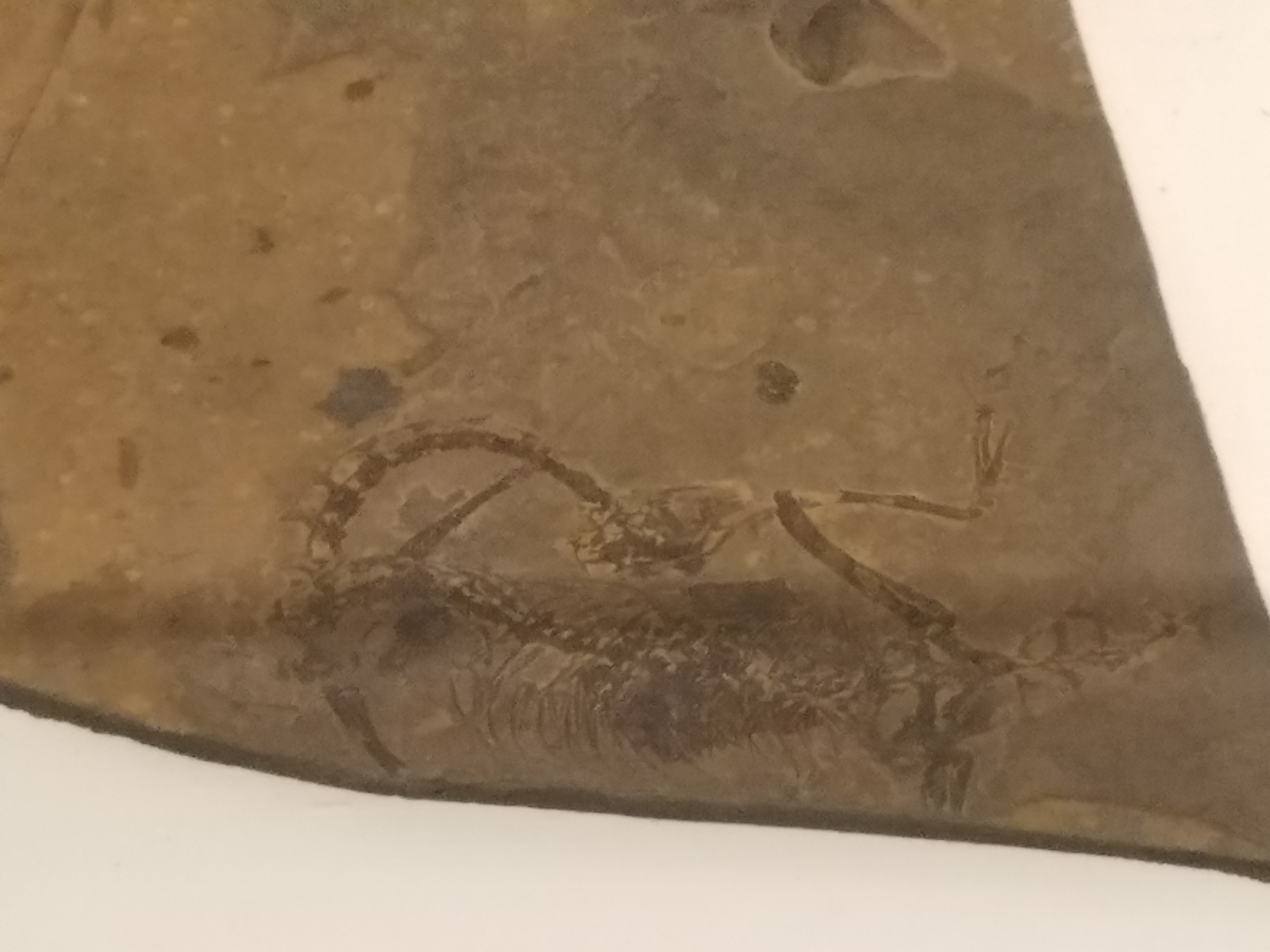
- A specimen of Tanytrachelos

Scientific classification
- Domain: Eukaryota
- Kingdom: Animalia
- Phylum: Chordata
- Class: Reptilia
- Clade: Archosauromorpha
- Clade: †Tanysauria
- Family: †Tanystropheidae
- Genus: †Tanytrachelos; Olsen, 1979

Type species
- †Tanytrachelos ahynis Olsen, 1979

Synonyms
- Gwyneddosaurus? Bock, 1945

= Tanytrachelos =

Tanytrachelos Temporal range: Late Triassic, Carnian

Extinct genus of reptiles

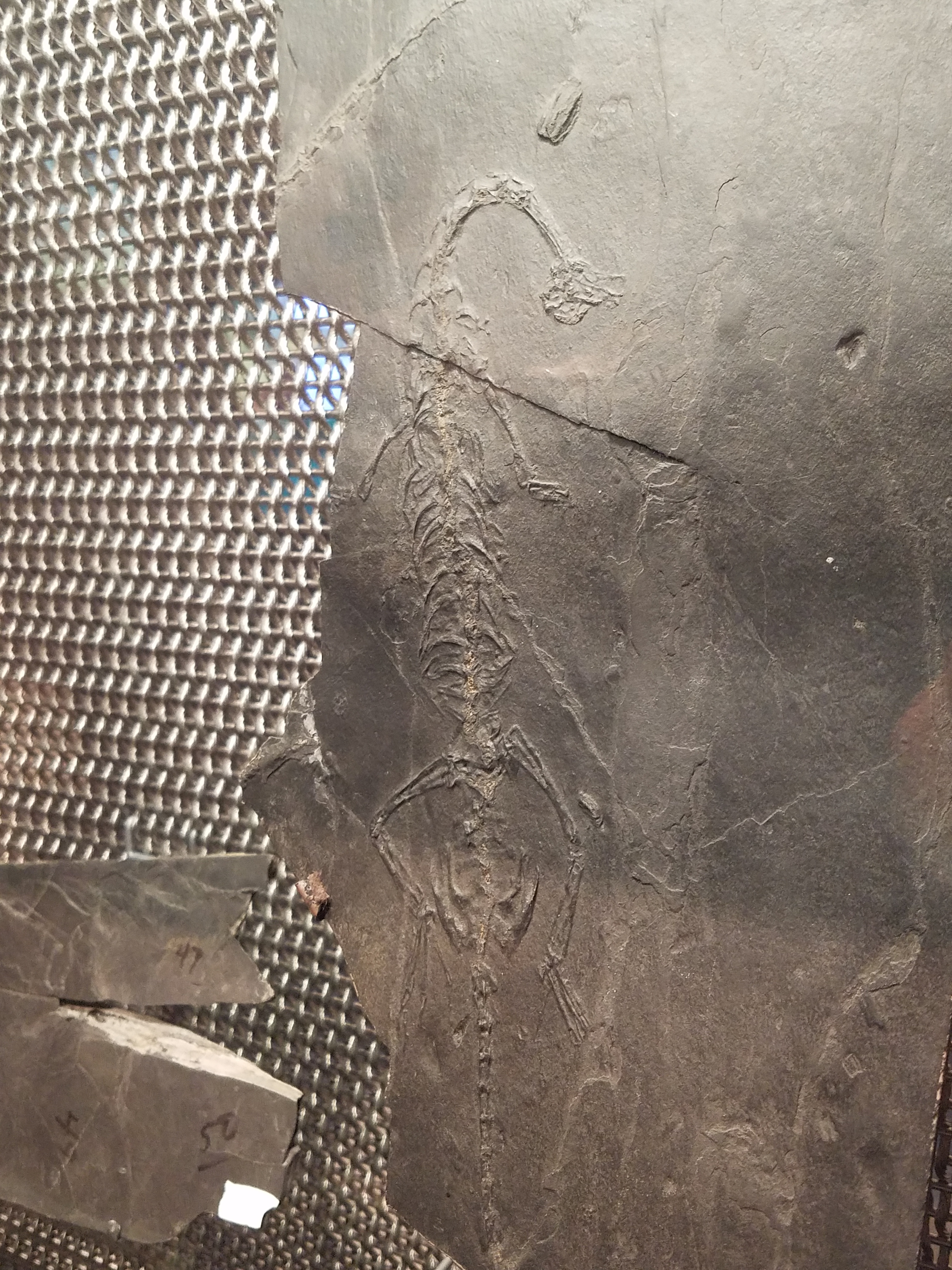
A "type A" Tanytrachelos, believed to be a female.

Tanytrachelos is an extinct genus of tanystropheid archosauromorph reptile from the Late Triassic of the eastern United States. It contains a single species, Tanytrachelos ahynis, which is known from several hundred fossil specimens preserved in the Solite Quarry in Cascade, Virginia. Abundant fossils of Tanytrachelos are found in a series of lakebed sediments that were deposited over the course of about 350 thousand years in a lake which existed approximately 230 million years ago. Some fossils are very well-preserved and include the remains of soft tissues. Tanytrachelos is the most likely trackmaker of the ichnogenus Gwyneddichnium.

Tanytrachelos remains have also been found in the Chinle Formation of Arizona and the Lockatong Formation of New Jersey.
