= Augustaburiania =

Augustaburiania Temporal range: Early Triassic, 251–247 Ma

Scientific classification
- Domain: Eukaryota
- Kingdom: Animalia
- Phylum: Chordata
- Class: Reptilia
- Clade: Archosauromorpha
- Family: †Tanystropheidae
- Genus: †Augustaburiania; Sennikov, 2011

Type species
- †Augustaburiania vatagini Sennikov, 2011

Extinct genus of reptiles

Augustaburiania is an extinct genus of tanystropheid archosauromorph from the latest Early Triassic (late Olenekian age) of Volgograd Region, western Russia. All specimens were recovered in the right slope of the Don River valley from the Lipovskaya Formation. It was named by Sennikov in 2011 and the type species is Augustaburiania vatagini. Augustaburiania is the oldest known tanystropheid.

Size compared to a human
