= Sclerostropheus =

Sclerostropheus Temporal range: Late Triassic, late Norian

Scientific classification
- Kingdom: Animalia
- Phylum: Chordata
- Class: Reptilia
- Family: †Tanystropheidae
- Genus: †Sclerostropheus; Spiekman & Scheyer, 2019

Type species
- †Sclerostropheus fossai Spiekman & Scheyer, 2019 (Wild 1980)

Synonyms
- Tanystropheus fossai Wild 1980

Extinct genus of archosauromorph

Sclerostropheus is an extinct genus of tanystropheid archosauromorph from the Late Triassic of Italy. The type species is S. fossai, from the Argillite di Riva di Solto.

== Discovery and naming ==
The holotype is MCSNB 4035 and it consists of four largely articulated cervical vertebrae and associated cervical ribs. It was recovered from the N-slope of the Canto Alto mountain near Poscante, Bergamo, Italy and was initially classified as a species of Tanystropheus by Wild (1980). Renesto & Dalla Vecchia (2000) also agreed that the species belonged to Tanystropheus.

Spiekman & Scheyer (2019) reclassified T. fossai by creating Schlerostropheus fossai.
