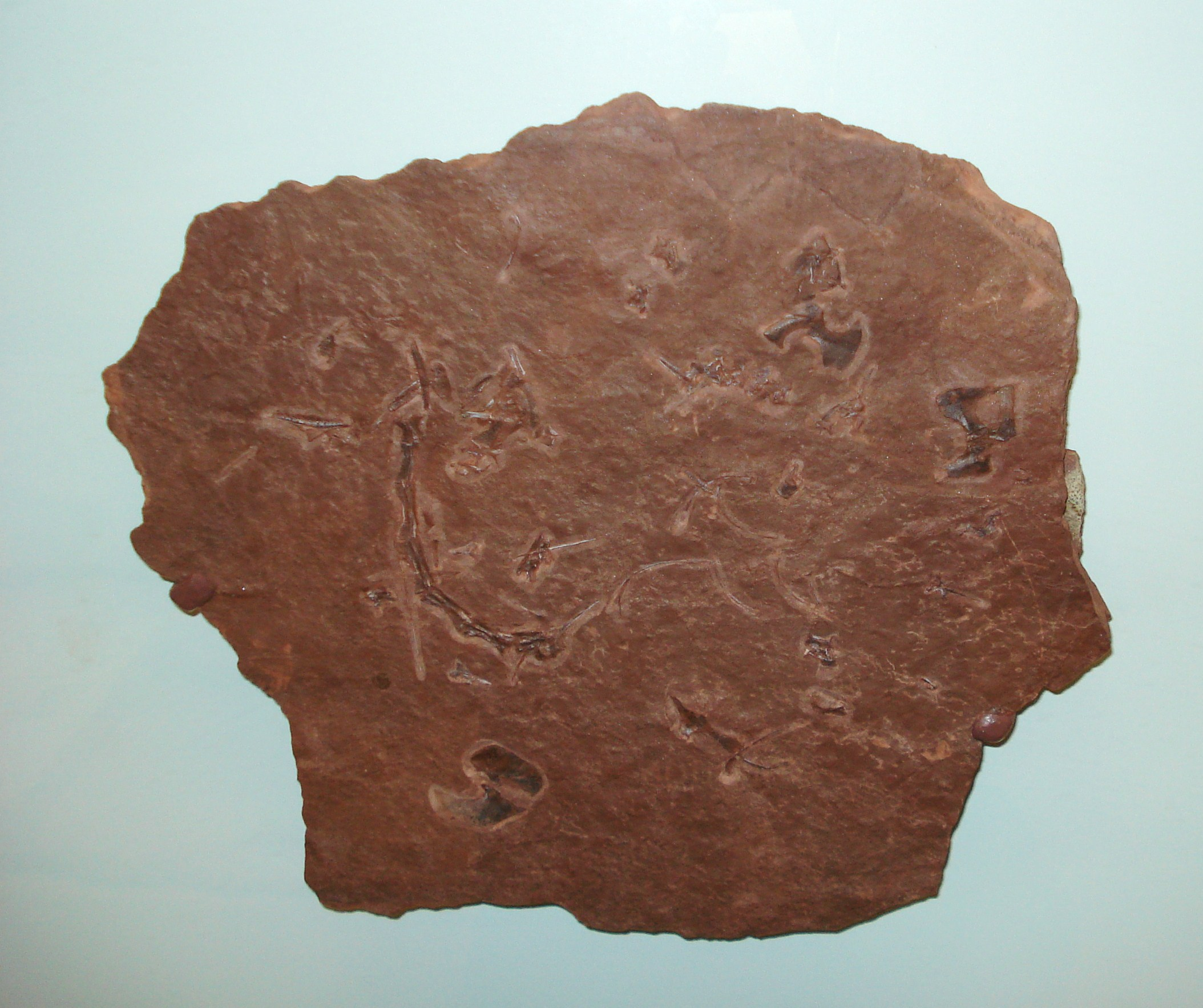
- Holotype of Amotosaurus rotfeldensis

Scientific classification
- Domain: Eukaryota
- Kingdom: Animalia
- Phylum: Chordata
- Class: Reptilia
- Clade: Archosauromorpha
- Family: †Tanystropheidae
- Genus: †Amotosaurus; Fraser & Rieppel, 2006

Type species
- †Amotosaurus rotfeldensis Fraser & Rieppel, 2006

= Amotosaurus =

Amotosaurus Temporal range: Anisian, 247–242 Ma

Extinct genus of reptiles

Amotosaurus is an extinct genus of tanystropheid protorosaur from the earliest Middle Triassic (early Anisian stage) of Black Forest, southwestern Germany. Amotosaurus is known from the holotype SMNS 50830, a partial skeleton including left maxilla with teeth, cervical series, pelvic girdle and other postcranial remains. Other specimens include SMNS 90600-90601, SMNS 50691, SMNS 54783a-b and SMNS 54810. It was first described and named by Nicholas C. Fraser and Olivier Rieppel in 2006 and the type species is Amotosaurus rotfeldensis.
