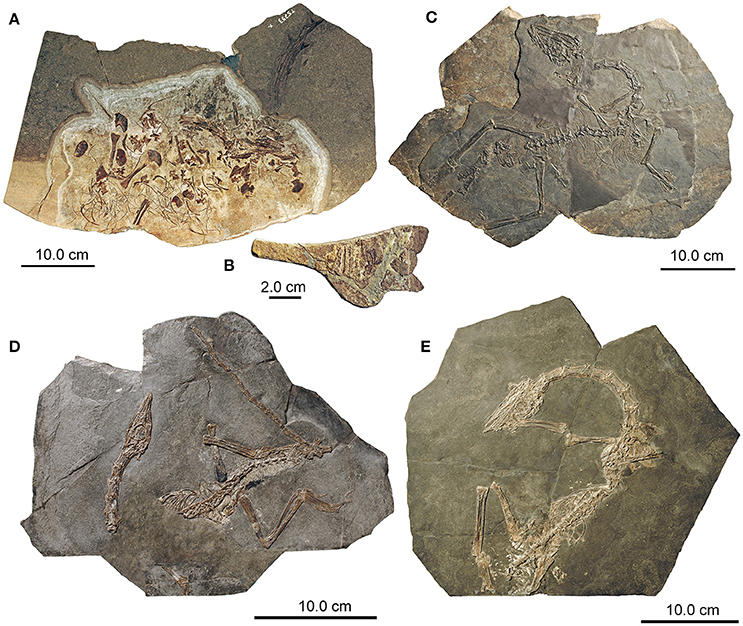
- Various specimens of Macrocnemus from Monte San Giorgio in Switzerland.

Scientific classification
- Kingdom: Animalia
- Phylum: Chordata
- Class: Reptilia
- Clade: †Tanysauria
- Family: †Tanystropheidae
- Genus: †Macrocnemus; Nopcsa, 1931

Species
- † M. bassanii Nopsca, 1931 (type); † M. fuyuanensis Li et al., 2007; † M. obristi Fraser & Furrer, 2013

= Macrocnemus =

Macrocnemus Temporal range: Middle Triassic, 245–228 Ma

Extinct genus of reptiles

Macrocnemus is an extinct genus of archosauromorph reptile known from the Middle Triassic (Late Anisian to Ladinian) of Europe and China. Macrocnemus is a member of the Tanystropheidae family and includes three species. Macrocnemus bassanii, the first species to be named and described, is known from the Besano Formation and adjacent paleontological sites in the Italian and Swiss Alps. Macrocnemus fuyuanensis, on the other hand, is known from the Zhuganpo Formation in southern China. A third species, Macrocnemus obristi, is known from the Prosanto Formation of Switzerland and is characterized by gracile limbs. The name Macrocnemus is Greek for "long tibia".

== Description ==
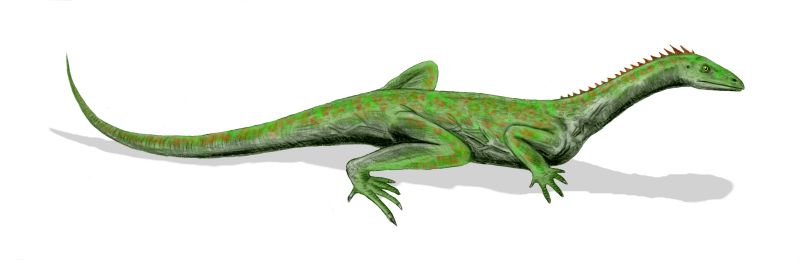
Life restoration of Macrocnemus bassanii

Macrocnemus is known from multiple specimens, most belonging to M. bassanii. It is a small reptile measuring 1.1–1.2 metres (3.6–3.9 ft) long. Macrocnemus possessed at least 52 or 53 caudal vertebrae. Like many other early archosauromorphs, Macrocnemus had a small and low head on the end of a thin neck containing vertebrae with low neural spines and long cervical ribs. Many archosauromorphs with these features have been grouped within the order Protorosauria, although it is debatable whether this order is valid. Features that are common to most "protorosaurs" like Macrocnemus include the ankle having a hooked fifth metatarsal attached to elongated limb elements, with tarsal elements with well-ossified proximal and distal ends. Unlike in Tanystropheus, digit V of the proximal phalanx of Macrocnemus is shorter than the other digits.

== Species ==
=== M. bassanii ===
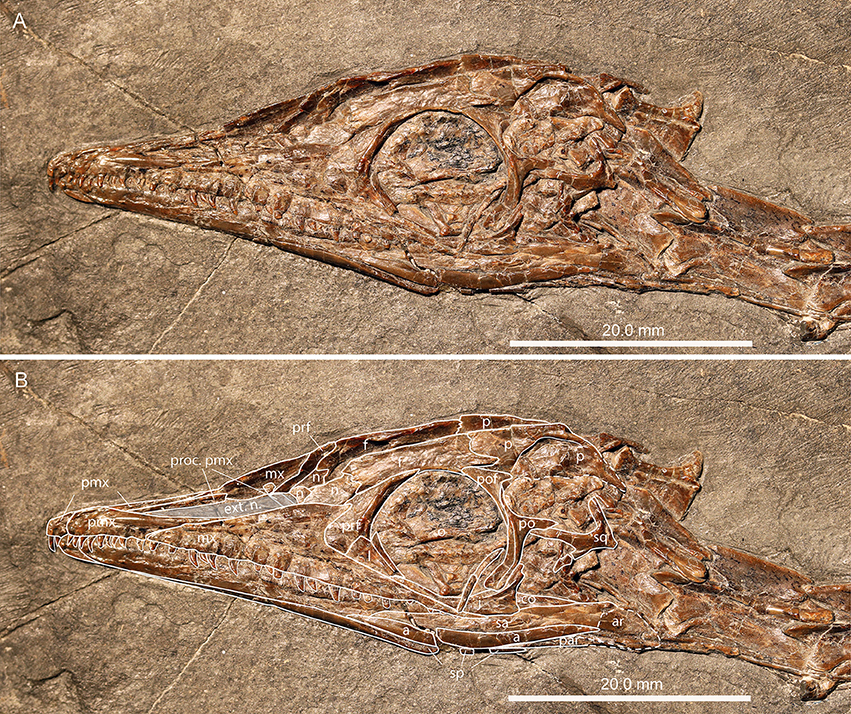
The skull of PIMUZ T 4822, a specimen of Macrocnemus bassanii

Macrocnemus bassanii is the most well-known and numerous species of Macrocnemus. Although the holotype specimen of this species was destroyed during World War II, a cast of the specimen (MSNM 14624, or alternatively PIMUZ T 2473) survived.

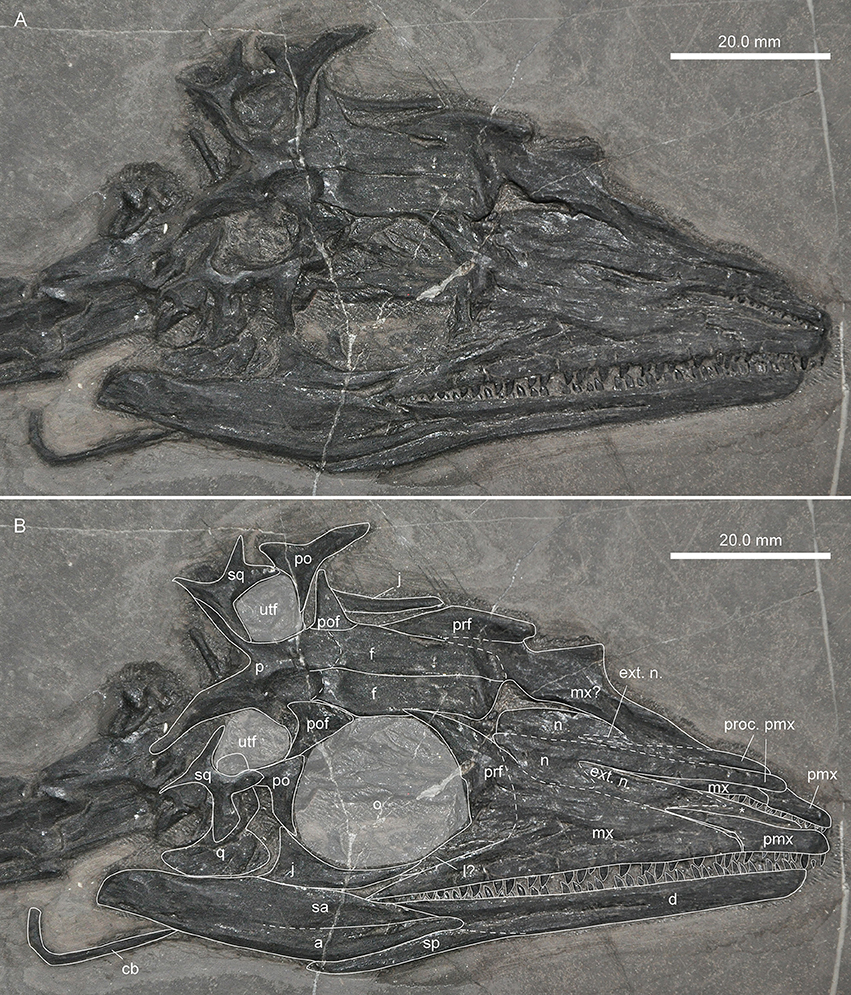
The skull of GMPKU-P-3001, a specimen of Macrocnemus fuyuanensis

Numerous complete or partial specimens of M. bassanni housed at PIMUZ (Paläontologisches Institut und Museum der Universität Zürich) include A III/208, T 1534, T 2470, T 2472, T 2474 through T 2477, T 2809, T 2812 through T 2816, T 4822, and T 4355.

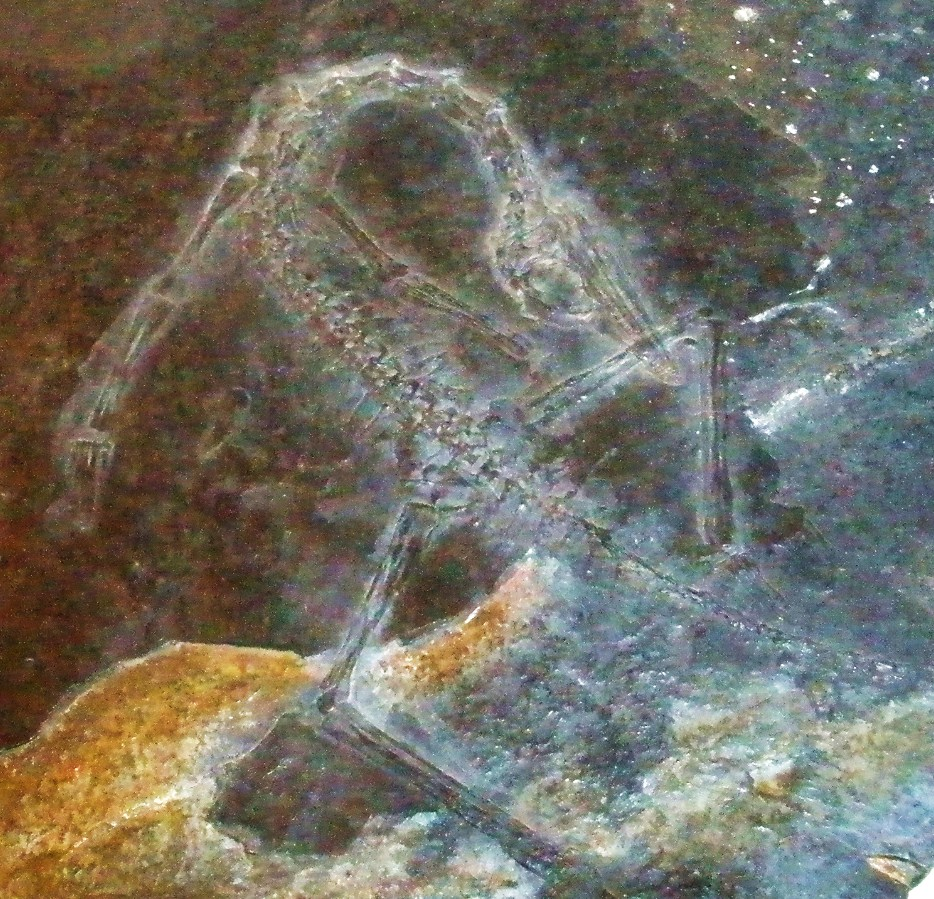
MSNM BES SC11, a fossil of a juvenile Macrocnemus bassanii

The smallest specimen of this species is MSNM BES SC111, which is believed to be a juvenile about 30 centimeters long. The largest specimens were about 90 centimeters long.

=== M. fuyuanensis ===
Macrocnemus fuyuanensis was discovered at the Yunnan Province, southwestern China from the marine of the Triassic. More specially, it is known from the Zhuganpo Formation (formerly Zhuganpo Member of the Falang Formation). This species in known from two nearly complete specimens, IVPP V15001 (the holotype specimen) and GMPKU-P-3001. The main features that set this species apart from M. bassanii include the presence of 17 or 18 dorsal vertebrae, a humerus which is longer than the radius, and a femur which is longer than the tibia. The front of the skull also differs compared to M. bassanii. According to Olivier Riepple et al, "a large, plate-like lacrimal is located in front of the tall, columnar prefrontal that defines the anterior margin of the orbit. A longitudinally oriented nasal groove extends along the anterior two-thirds of the snout, accommodating the external naris at its anterior part". This species is also larger than M. bassanii.

In 2017, a new specimen of Macrocnemus from the Besano Formation was described. This specimen, PIMUZ T 1559, possessed a long humerus, similar to that of M. fuyuanensis. It also differed from M. bassanii in the construction of its interclavicle. However, the interclavicles of the Chinese specimens are difficult to observe, and thus it is uncertain whether this European specimen is truly a member of M. fuyuanensis. Its describers placed it as "Macrocnemus aff. M. fuyuanensis", indicating its close relations to this species.

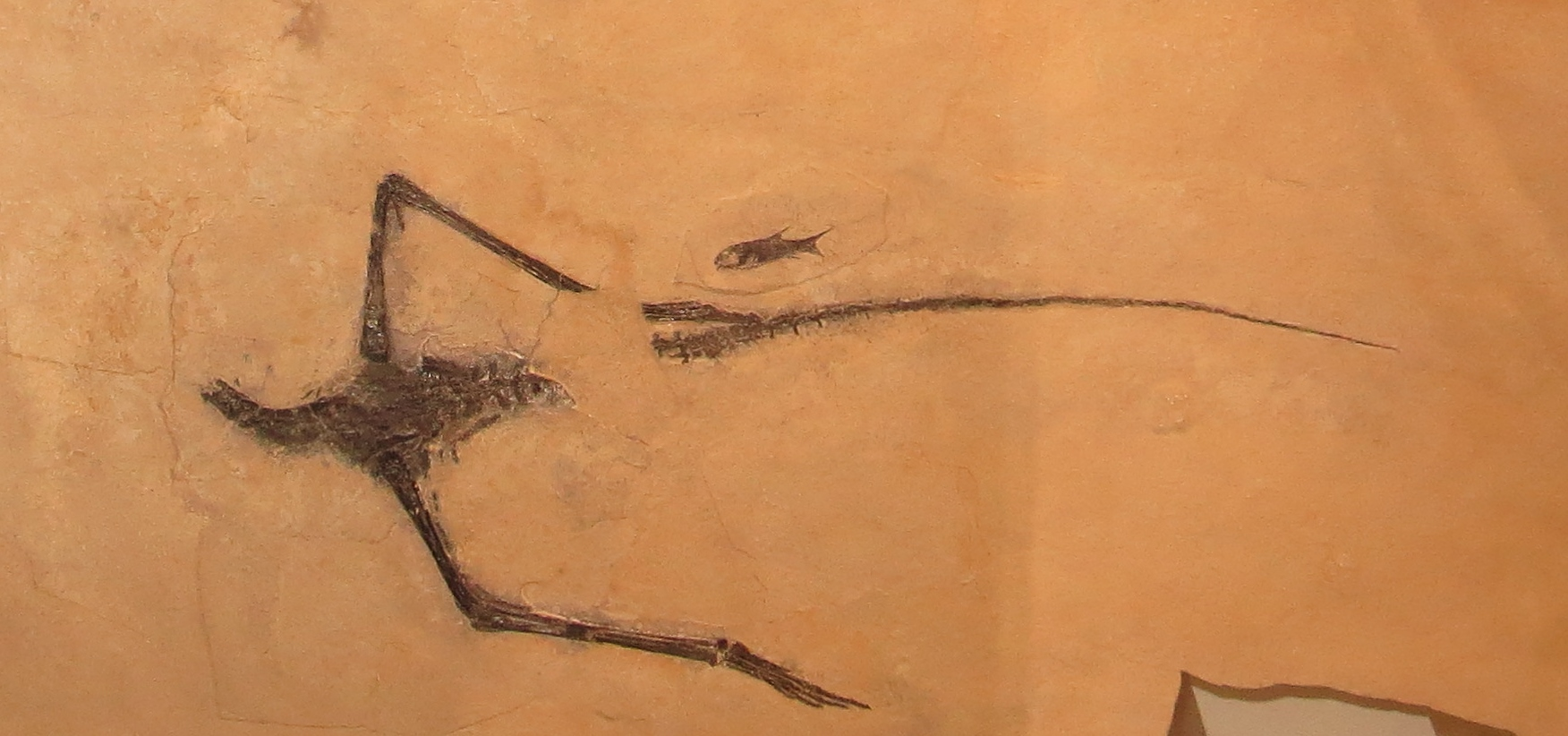
A cast of PIMUZ A/III 1467, the holotype of Macrocnemus obristi

=== M. obristi ===
Macrocnemus obristi was discovered by Christian Obrist during an excavation from the Upper Prosanto Formation, which is dated to the middle Triassic. It is known from two specimens, PIMUZ A/III 1467 (the holotype, consisting of a complete articulated tail, legs, and pelvic region) and PIMUZ A/III 722 (an isolated right tarsus). It is noticeably characterized by its gracile limb elements (including slender metatarsals) and a tibia which is 20% longer than the femur. Preserved soft tissue has also been found in the pelvic girdle of M. obristi's holotype.

== Paleobiology ==
Some features of the limbs imply that Macrocnemus lived in terrestrial habitats and was capable of rapid bipedal movement. Macrocnemus and Tanystropheus are among the most common "protorosaur" genera found in middle Triassic marine sediments. The presence of both Macrocnemus and Tanystropheus in both Switzerland and southwestern China suggest that the fauna of the western and eastern Tethyan realms was similar during the Middle and early Late Triassic.

== Classification ==
In 1970 Romer classified Macrocnemus as a lepidosaur related to modern lizards and tuataras, but in 1988 Carroll reclassified it as a member of Protorosauria. Other "protorosaurs" include Protorosaurus and Tanystropheus. Protorosaurs may not form a valid monophyletic clade according to some studies, which place tanystropheids as more derived archosauromorphs than other "protorosaurs". Macrocnemus is believed to be an early member of the tanystropheid family, as it shares many small skeletal features with Tanystropheus yet lacks the very elongated neck of that genus and other derived tanystropheids.
