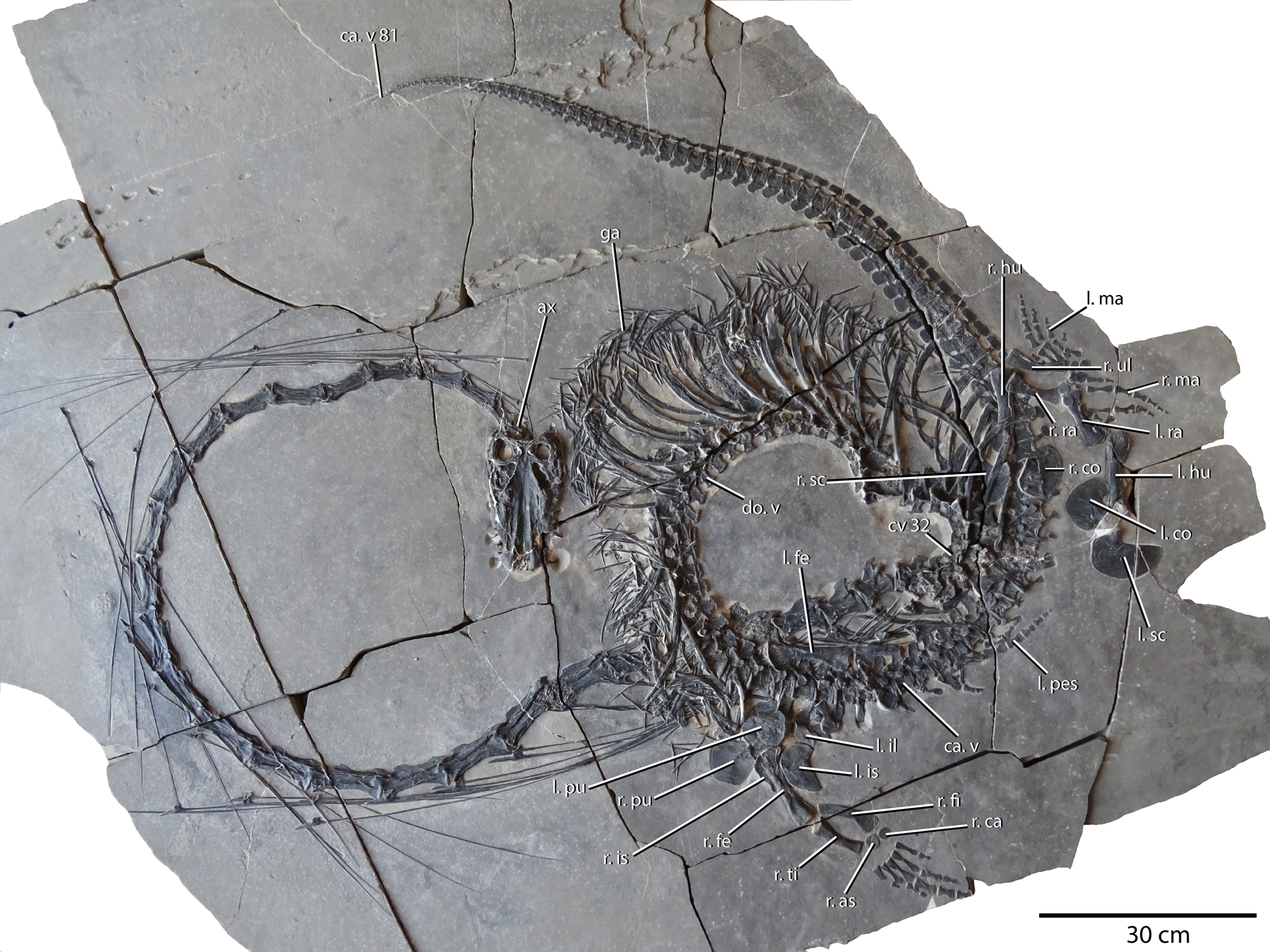
- Complete, articulated skeleton (IVPP V20295)

Scientific classification
- Kingdom: Animalia
- Phylum: Chordata
- Clade: †Tanysauria
- Family: †Trachelosauridae
- Genus: †Dinocephalosaurus; Li, 2003
- Species: †D. orientalis

Binomial name
- †Dinocephalosaurus orientalis Li, 2003

= Dinocephalosaurus =

Dinocephalosaurus Temporal range: Anisian, 245–244 Ma

Extinct genus of reptiles

Dinocephalosaurus (meaning "terrible-headed reptile") is a genus of long necked, aquatic protorosaur that inhabited the Triassic seas of China. The genus contains the type and only known species, D. orientalis, which was named by Chun Li in 2003. Unlike other long-necked protorosaurs (which form a group known as the tanystropheids), Dinocephalosaurus convergently evolved a long neck not through elongation of individual neck vertebrae, but through the addition of neck vertebrae that each had a moderate length. As indicated by phylogenetic analyses, it belonged in a separate lineage that also included at least its closest relative Pectodens, which was named the Dinocephalosauridae in 2021. Like tanystropheids, however, Dinocephalosaurus probably used its long neck to hunt, utilizing the fang-like teeth of its jaws to ensnare prey; proposals that it employed suction feeding have not been universally accepted. It was probably a marine animal by necessity, as suggested by the poorly-ossified and paddle-like limbs which would have prevented it from going ashore.

Specimens belonging to the genus were first discovered in a locality near Xinmin in Guizhou, China in 2002. At the same locality, which dates to 244 million years ago, other marine reptiles such as Mixosaurus, Keichousaurus, and Wumengosaurus have also been found. While the type specimen consisted only of a skull and the very front of the neck, additional specimens soon revealed the complete form of the body. Further discoveries of Dinocephalosaurus specimens were made in Luoping, Yunnan, China, starting in 2008. At this locality, Dinocephalosaurus would have lived alongside Mixosaurus, Dianopachysaurus, and Sinosaurosphargis. One specimen discovered at the Luoping locality preserves an embryo within its abdomen, indicating that Dinocephalosaurus gave birth to live young like many other marine reptiles. Dinocephalosaurus is the only known member of the Archosauromorpha to give live birth, with the possible exception of the metriorhynchids, a group of marine crocodylomorphs.

== Discovery and naming ==
=== Panxian ===
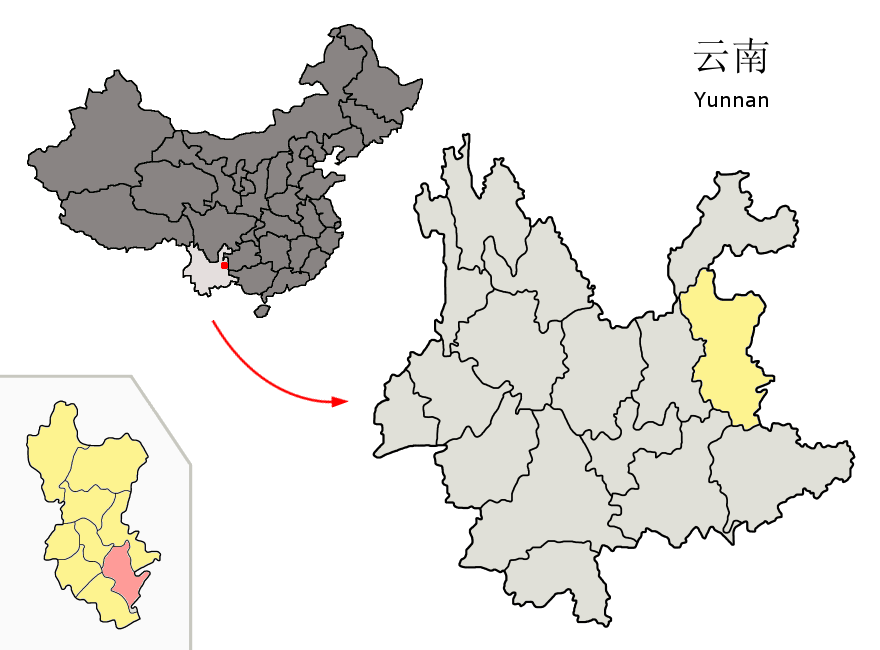
Location of Luoping in Yunnan, China; Panxian is located in the neighboring Guizhou, to the east

The type specimen of Dinocephalosaurus was first discovered in 2002, during fieldwork conducted in Yangjuan Village, Xinmin District, Panxian County, Guizhou, China. It consists of a nearly-complete skull missing the left side of the jaw, as well as several associated cervical vertebrae. It was subsequently stored at the Institute of Vertebrate Paleontology and Paleoanthropology (IVPP) in Beijing, China under the collection number IVPP V13767, and a research paper describing the specimen was authored by IVPP paleontologist Chun Li and published by Acta Geologica Sinica in December 2003.

A second specimen discovered at the same locality represents a partially articulated skeleton that is only lacking the tail. Likewise stored at the IVPP, the specimen has the collection number IVPP V13898. The specimen was described in a brief correspondence authored by Li, Olivier Rieppel, and Michael LaBarbera that was published by Science in September 2004; a more detailed description was subsequently published by Rieppel, Li, Nicholas Fraser in a 2008 Journal of Vertebrate Paleontology paper.

The Panxian locality, from where these specimens originated, is part of Member II of the Anisian (Middle Triassic) Guanling Formation, which was initially thought to be 230 million years old, but has most recently been dated to 244 ± 1.3 million years old based on uranium–lead dating. Predominant deposits at this locality are composed of grey to dark grey marly limestone, as well as cherty limestone containing dolomite and bentonite beds. Dinocephalosaurus was specifically found in layer 90 of the Panxian deposits, a thin limestone layer which is traditionally assigned to the Upper Reptile Horizon (layers 87–90). Further below are the Middle Reptile (layers 81–85) and Lower Reptile (77–79) Horizons.

=== Luoping ===
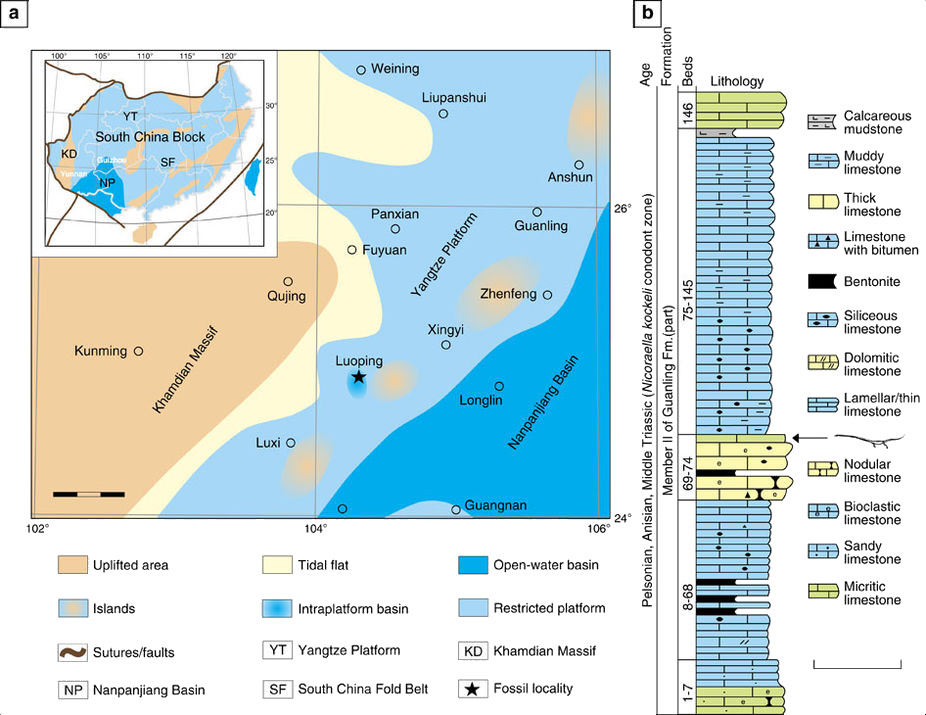
Map showing the location of Panxian and Luoping during the Anisian (a), with stratigraphic position of Luoping Dinocephalosaurus (b)

Subsequently, additional Dinocephalosaurus specimens were discovered from the slightly older Luoping locality, which has been dated to 245–244 million years old based on conodont biostratigraphy as well as preliminary radiometric dating. The specimens originate from bed 74 of the Luoping locality, in deposits located near the village of Dawazi, Luoping County, Yunnan, China. Bed 74 is part of a section composed of thin dark grey micritic limestone layers mixed with thicker layers of siliceous limestone and silty limestone, which extends downwards to bed 67.

One particular specimen is notable for containing an embryo in its abdominal region, of which cervical vertebrae, forelimbs, and several other elements are preserved. It was collected in 2008; by the time of its collection, weathering had already split the specimen into three blocks, with the gaps having been filled by modern soil. The specimen was then transferred to the Chengdu Center of the China Geological Survey, where it was prepared and stored under the collection number LPV 30280. Subsequently, a description of the specimen, authored by Jun Liu, Chris Organ, Michael Benton, Matthew Brandley, and Jonathan Aitchison, was published in February 2017 by Nature Communications.

At least one additional undescribed specimen of Dinocephalosaurus is known from an unspecified locality, having been catalogued as ZMNH M8752 in the Zhejiang Museum of Natural History. It was briefly mentioned in comparison to Fuyuansaurus by Fraser, Rieppel, and Li in 2013. Furthermore, another embryonic skeleton catalogued as IVPP V22788 was found at Luoping, and was considered by them to be closely related to Dinocephalosaurus on account of its large number of short neck vertebrae and its pillar-like limbs. However, they also noted some differences that were likely unrelated to growth, such as the presence of fewer (24 instead of 33) neck vertebrae and the presence of a scleral ring, which led them to assign it to not Dinocephalosaurus but a closely related animal.

=== Naming ===
In his 2003 description, Li combined the roots of din- ("terrible"), kephal- ("head"), and saur ("lizard") to create the genus name Dinocephalosaurus. According to Li, this name refers to the "ghastful skull" of the holotype. Meanwhile, the species name is derived from Latin orientalis ("eastern"), in reference to D. orientalis representing the only known record at the time of the Tanystropheidae in what would have been the eastern portion of the Tethys Ocean.

== Description ==
Size compared to a human

Dinocephalosaurus was a very large non-crocopodan archosauromorph, attaining a maximum body length of up to 6 metres (20 ft), compared to a maximum of 5–6 m (16–20 ft) for Tanystropheus. The known specimens were probably mature, given that they have fused skull bones and lack the multi-cusped teeth seen in juvenile Tanystropheus.

=== Skull ===
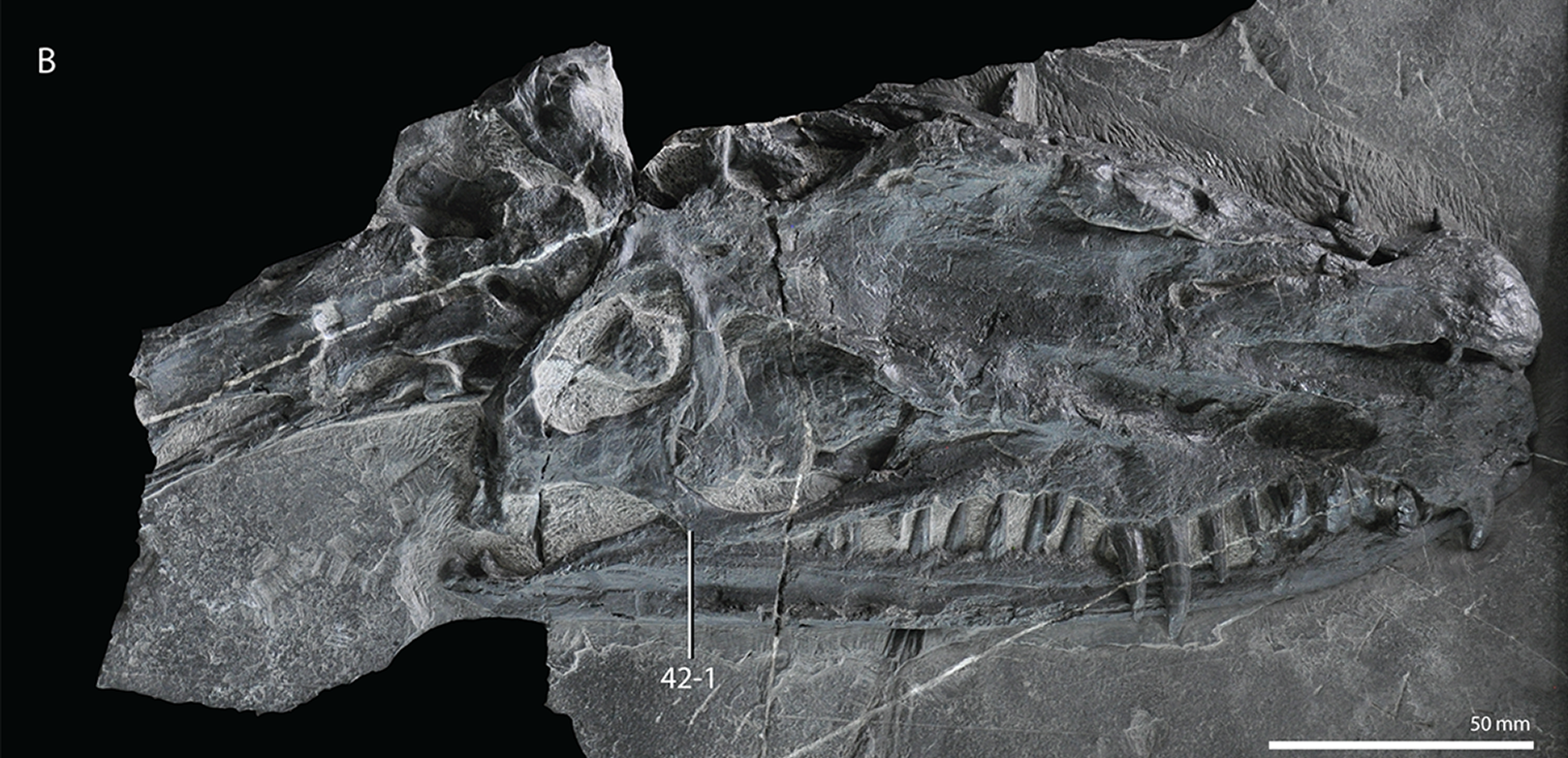
Skull of the holotype specimen IVPP V13767, with label 42-1 indicating the missing rear process of the jugal

The skull of Dinocephalosaurus was low and narrow, with a long premaxilla and maxilla compared to those of Tanystropheus. Both the premaxilla and the maxilla met at the front bottom corner and contributed to the border of the nostril, which was located at the front end of a long recess that extended along the snout in front of the eye socket (the antorbital depression). This recess was also present in Macrocnemus and Fuyuansaurus. Like Pectodens, the thickness of the premaxilla meant that the nostrils were retracted from the tip of the snout. The bottom margins of the two snout bones were respectively lined with five and twelve long and nail-like teeth; the third premaxillary and fourth and fifth maxillary teeth were distinctly fang-like. The lower jaw preserves fifteen teeth, with three of them having been fang-like and forming a "fish trap". By comparison, the teeth in adult Tanystropheus were sharp pegs, while they were tricuspid (bearing three cusps) in juveniles.

Unlike the oval-shaped eye socket of Tanystropheus, the eye socket of Dinocephalosaurus appears to have been peach-shaped, with a narrow front end. On the top of the skull, the parietal was broad and flattened, bearing no trace of the midline crest found in Tanystropheus. The jugal only had two processes, missing the third backward-projecting process present in most other archosauromorphs, but shared with Pectodens, Claudiosaurus, and Trilophosaurus. Also missing were the retroarticular process of the rear lower jaw (another point of distinction from Tanystropheus), as well as additional teeth and a cavity between the pterygoid bones on the palate.

=== Neck and trunk ===
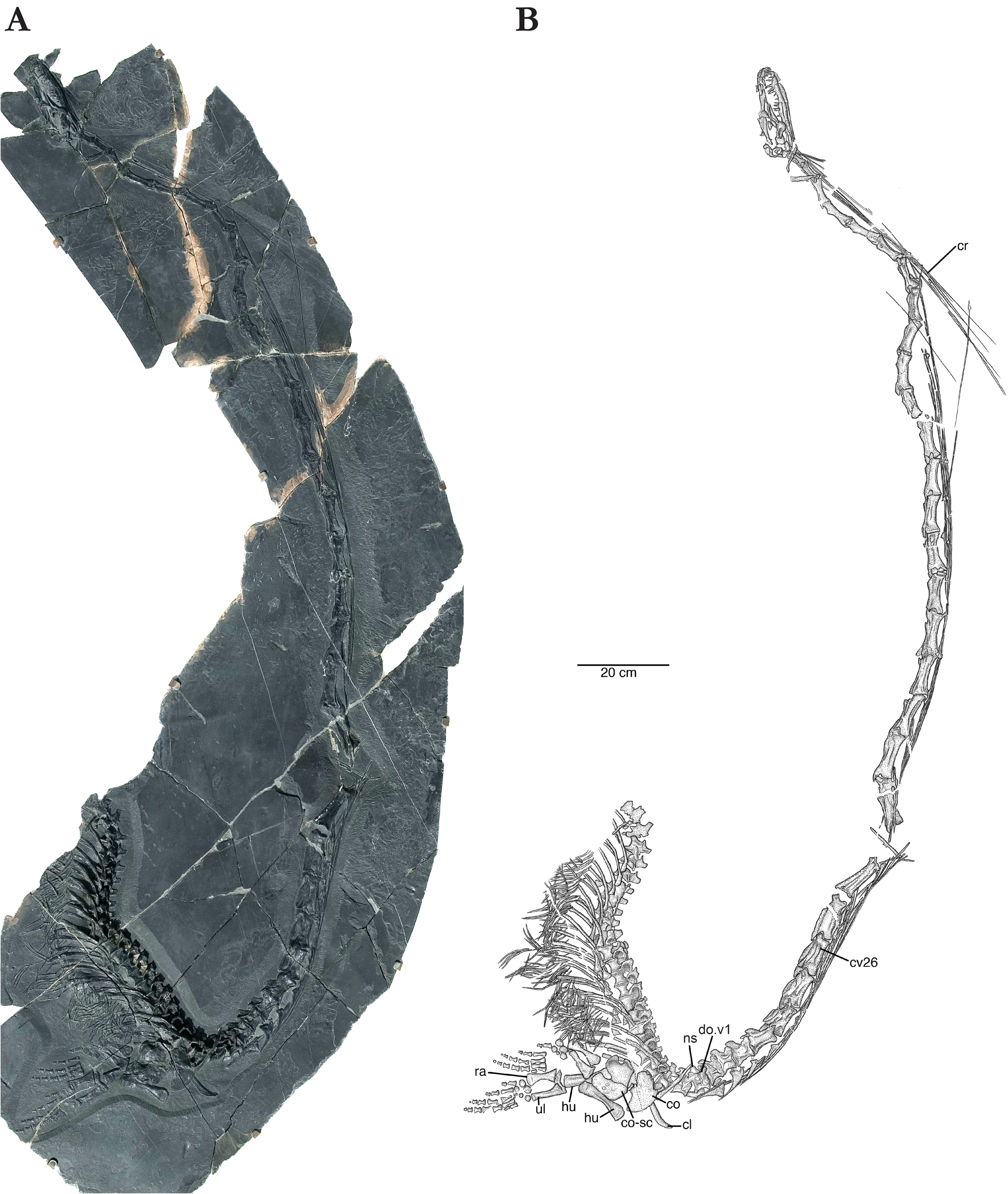
Photograph (a) and interpretive drawing (b) of ZMNH M8728; note the long neck

Like Tanystropheus, Dinocephalosaurus had an exceptionally long neck (1.7 m (5 ft 7 in) long) relative to its torso (1 m (3 ft 3 in) excluding the tail). Tanystropheus and Dinocephalosaurus accomplished their extremely elongated necks in different ways. The neck of Tanystropheus was composed of 13 elongated neck vertebrae, whereas the neck of Dinocephalosaurus was composed of at least 27 neck vertebrae that were not as elongated. Among the 27 vertebrae of Dinocephalosaurus, the longest was the nineteenth, which measured approximately 91 mm (3.6 in) long. By comparison, the longest vertebrae in a Chinese specimen of Tanystropheus were the ninth and tenth, which measured 248 mm (9.8 in) long. Additionally, the neck vertebrae of Dinocephalosaurus were not hollow, unlike those of Tanystropheus.

Additional features of the neck vertebrae which distinguished Dinocephalosaurus from other protorosaurs included the low and keel-like neural spines with concave top edges, and the front and rear articular surfaces of the vertebrae both being concave (amphicoelous). In the first ten neck vertebrae, the bottom margin was also concave. The long, slender neck ribs bore frontal projections free of the vertebral bodies, which was a rare feature otherwise seen only in Pectodens, Czatkowiella, Sclerostropheus, and Tanytrachelos. These ribs were aligned along the neck and bridged multiple consecutive vertebral joints, from two or three consecutive joints in the front of the neck to five or six in the rear of the neck. There appear to have been no distinct processes on the vertebrae for articulation with the ribs.

The trunk of Dinocephalosaurus had a very high count of least 26 vertebrae. In Dinocephalosaurus, there appear to have been no lumbar vertebrae, or vertebrae of the trunk lacking ribs. The ribs of the sacrum and tail also do not appear to have been fused to their corresponding vertebrae. Each of the gastralia in Dinocephalosaurus was composed of three elements instead of four as in Tanystropheus; they differed in that Dinocephalosaurus only had one element on the midline, while Tanystropheus had two elements that combined to form a midline bar.

=== Limbs ===
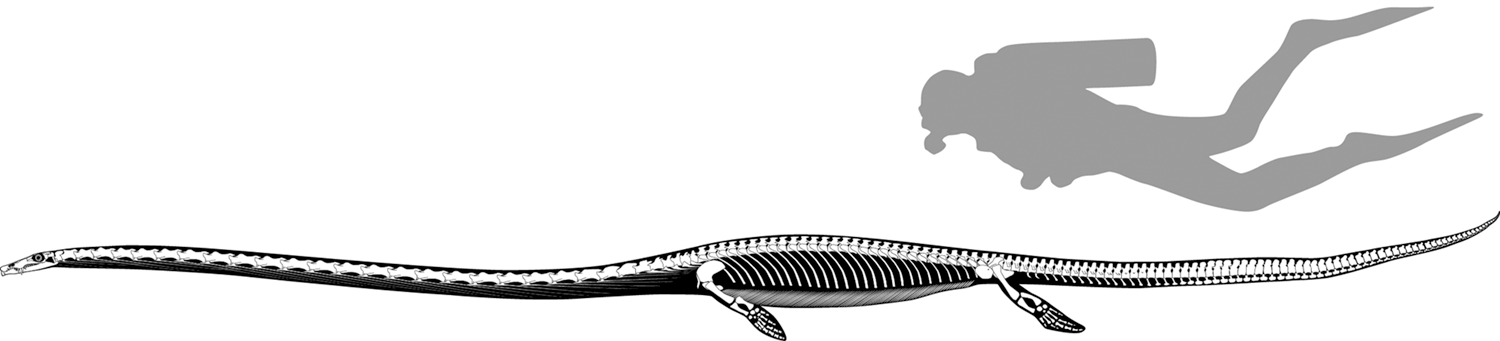
Skeletal reconstruction

Dinocephalosaurus had relatively large legs terminating in flipper-like feet. The forelimbs and hindlimbs are roughly the same length, unlike Tanystropheus where the forelimbs were much smaller. Whereas most protorosaurs, such as Tanystropheus, Macrocnemus, and Langobardisaurus, had relatively ossified limbs adapted for terrestrial life, the stout limbs of Dinocephalosaurus were poorly ossified and resembled those of nothosaurs. Out of the carpal bones, only six were ossified; similarly, only three of the tarsal bones were ossified. Additionally, the astragalus and calcaneum also did not articulate with each other in the ankle, instead forming simple and rounded ossifications. Another adaptation to aquatic life was the loss of an opening known as the thyroid fenestra in the pelvis due to the rounded pelvic bones, which was also present in Fuyuansaurus.

These traits were probably neotenic, which similarly characterizes traits found in many other aquatic tetrapods. While Tanystropheus was likely also neotenic, it did not approach Dinocephalosaurus in the extremity of this condition. Several other peculiar traits were present in the feet of Dinocephalosaurus. Unlike Tanystropheus and most other protorosaurs, the fifth metatarsal of Dinocephalosaurus was simple and straight instead of hooked. Tanystropheus had a fifth metatarsal which was mildly thickened at the top end, and it additionally possessed a long phalanx on the fifth digit that acted not unlike another metatarsal. On the third digit of the foot of Dinocephalosaurus, there were four phalanges, but none of them appear to have been the terminal claw. This suggests that Dinocephalosaurus had a higher-than-average count of at least five phalanges in the third digit.

== Classification ==
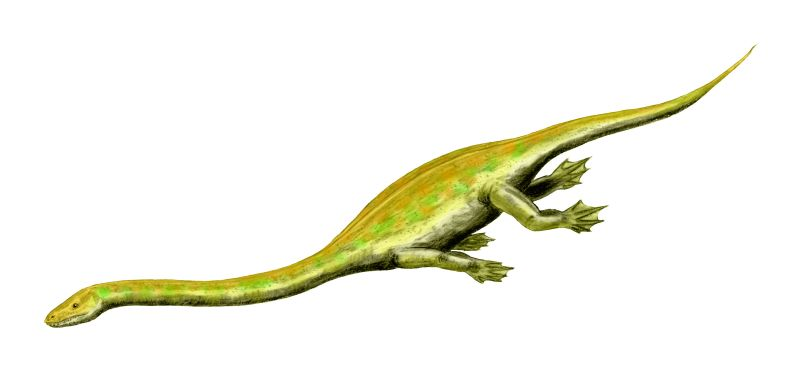
Life restoration

Dinocephalosaurus was considered to be a member of the Protorosauria, a group of ubiquitous and diverse Permo-Triassic reptiles. This assignment was based upon characteristics including the low and narrow skull with a short and narrow postorbital region; the long nasal bone relative to the frontal bone; the reduced backward projection of the jugal; the presence of more than seven neck vertebrae, with centra (bodies) longer than those of the trunk vertebrae; the low neural spines of the neck vertebrae; the long neck ribs; the lack of intercentra articulating with the centra of the trunk vertebrae; and the absence of an entepicondylar foramen on the humerus. These characteristics were shared with Tanystropheus, Macrocnemus, and other protorosaurs.

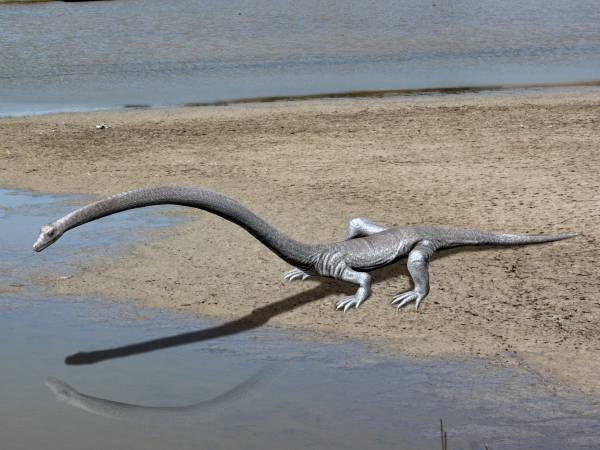
Dinocephalosaurus and its close relative Tanystropheus, shown here, evolved their long necks convergently

Protorosaurs were formerly considered to be the ancestors of lizards, but phylogenetic analysis has subsequently verified that they were in fact non-archosaur archosauromorphs. As originally defined, the Protorosauria referred to the group containing Protorosaurus and Prolacerta, and included the "Prolacertiformes" as a subdivision. In 1997, Nour-Eddine Jalil conducted an analysis of the "Prolacertiformes"; this analysis expanded its definition to include 14 genera, including the Tanystropheidae. Subsequent research has generally found that Prolacerta was closer to the Archosauriformes than Protorosaurus, making the "Prolacertiformes" non-monophyletic (i.e., composed of several groups that were not sister groups). This research also suggested that the remaining protorosaurs – including Protorosaurus, tanystropheids, and drepanosaurs in some studies – did not necessarily form a monophyletic group. An increasing number of analyses have found a non-monophyletic Protorosauria with Protorosaurus as being more basal (less specialised) than the Tanystropheidae, and drepanosaurs outside Archosauromorpha altogether.

In the original description of Dinocephalosaurus, Li recognized the postorbital region and the elongated cervical centra as being indicative of a close relationship with Tanystropheus, which led him to assign it to the Tanystropheidae. However, Rieppel and colleagues subsequently noted characteristics that distinguished Dinocephalosaurus from derived protorosaurs such as Tanystropheus, Macrocnemus, Langobardisaurus, and Tanytrachelos; these include the lack of tapering at the front end of the nasal and an unreduced contribution of the ilium to the acetabulum. This led Rieppel and colleagues to consider Dinocephalosaurus as an indeterminate protorosaur, with its neck elongation having been convergent upon that of Tanystropheus. Their phylogenetic tree, based on a dataset derived from the separate analyses of Jalil (1997), David Dilkes (1998), and Michael Benton & Jackie Allen (1997), is reproduced below, at left.

Topology A: Rieppel et al. (2008)

- Protorosauria
  - - Drepanosaurus
    - Megalancosaurus
  - Jesairosaurus
  - Dinocephalosaurus
  - - Macrocnemus
    - - Langobardisaurus
      - - Tanystropheus
        - Tanytrachelos

Topology B: Liu et al. (2017)

- Protorosauria
  - Jesairosaurus
  - - - Megalancosaurus
      - - Drepanosaurus
        - Vallesaurus
    - - Boreopricea
      - Tanystropheidae
        - - Macrocnemus
          - - Langobardisaurus
            - - Tanystropheus
              - Tanytrachelos
        - Dinocephalosaurus

Liu and colleagues published a separate phylogenetic analysis in 2017. They criticized the analysis of Rieppel and colleagues as having unnecessarily repeated several characters in their data, thus imbuing the repeated characters with undue weight in the analysis. In their own analysis, Liu and colleagues used the same source datasets, but deleted repeated characters, added two new characters from an analysis by Sean Modesto and Hans-Dieter Sues (2004), and removed poorly preserved or potentially chimeric taxa such as Cosesaurus, Kadimakara, Trachelosaurus, and Malerisaurus. Analyses based on parsimony-based and Bayesian methods found that Dinocephalosaurus was a member of the Tanystropheidae, being the sister group to a monophyletic group containing Tanystropheus, Macrocnemus, Langobardisaurus, and Tanytrachelos. The analyses also recovered a monophyletic Protorosauria, albeit to the exclusion of Prolacerta. The tree from the parsimony-based analysis is reproduced above, at right.

Several subsequent studies found Dinocephalosaurus to have been closely related to but outside the Tanystropheidae. Martín Ezcurra and Richard J. Butler published a phylogenetic analysis based on a different dataset in 2018, which included all archosauromorphs from the middle Permian to the early Late Triassic known at the time. They also found that Dinocephalosaurus in a polytomy with Tanystropheidae and Trachelosaurus. Jesairosaurus was found to be the most closely related genus to this polytomy. In 2020, Tiane De-Oliveira and colleagues added Dinocephalosaurus, Jesairosaurus, and Elessaurus to another dataset published by Adam Pritchard and colleagues in 2018, while also introducing modifications based on Ezcurra and Butler's dataset. Although their phylogenetic analysis recovered a poorly-resolved tree with a large polytomy, they found that Dinocephalosaurus and Jesairosaurus formed a group that was basal to Tanystropheidae and other archosauromorphs.

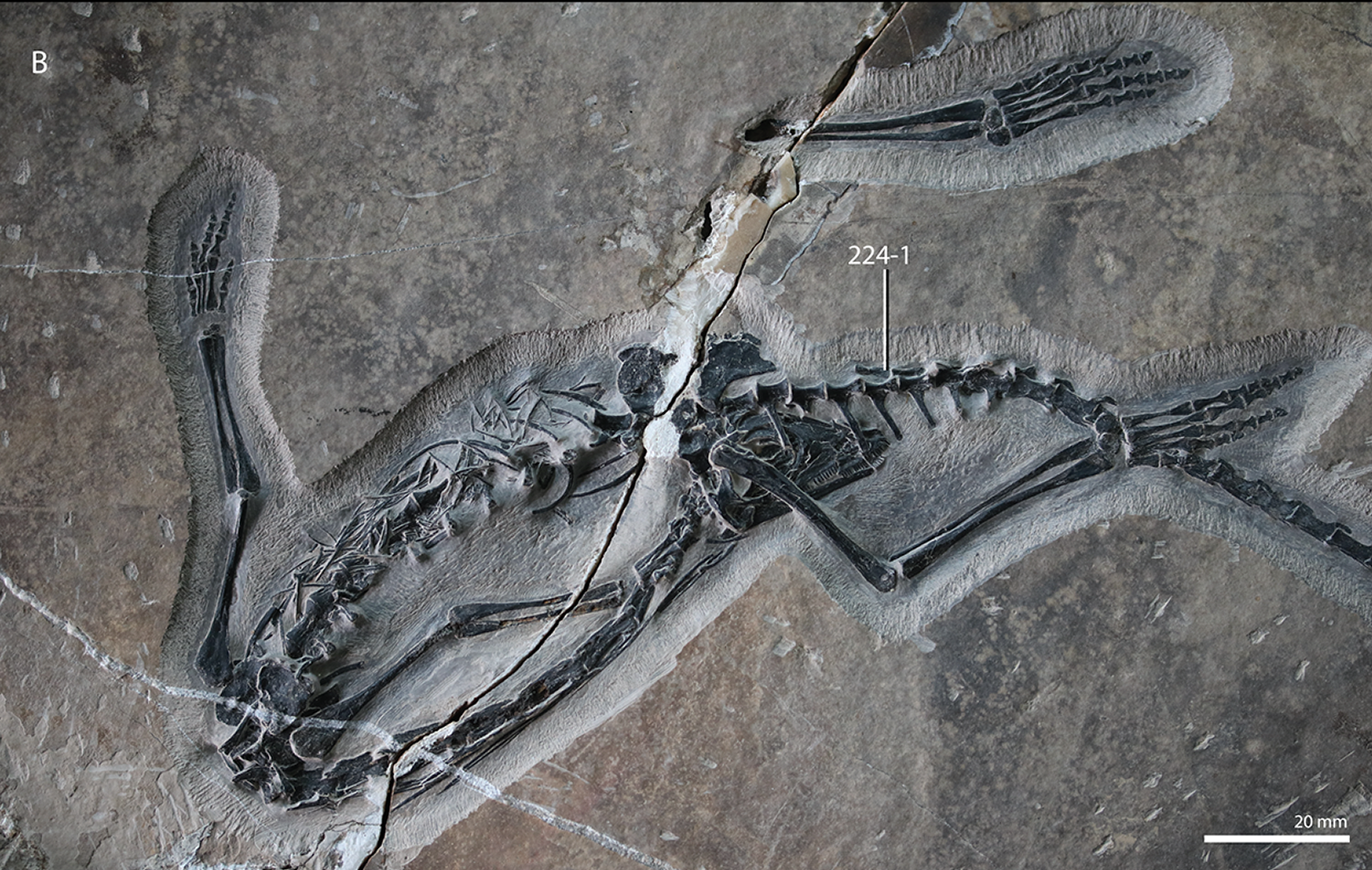
The terrestrial Pectodens was the closest relative of Dinocephalosaurus in the Dinocephalosauridae

In 2021, Stephan Spiekman and colleagues introduced yet another dataset specifically to test the phylogenetic relationships of protorosaurs. Different analyses were performed using datasets that incorporated different species and anatomical characteristics. They found that Dinocephalosaurus and Pectodens consistently formed a group, which they named as the Dinocephalosauridae. Some analyses (specifically, those excluding characters based on ratios or with orderings) also found that either Sclerostropheus and "Tanystropheus" antiquus fell inside this group. Either Fuyuansaurus or Jesairosaurus were found to be the closest relative of the dinocephalosaurids in some analyses. With the exception of Jesairosaurus, these genera of uncertain placement were found to be deeply nested within the Tanystropheidae by other analyses. Providing formal support for the original hypothesis of Rieppel and colleagues, Spiekman and colleagues found that placing Dinocephalosaurus as the sister group of Tanystropheus required a tree that was six steps longer, and therefore less likely.

In 2024, Spiekman and colleagues published a redescription of Dinocephalosaurus, including a description of five additional new specimens. Using an updated version of Spiekman's previous dataset, they recovered similar phylogenetic relationships, with Dinocephalosaurus forming a clade with Pectodens outside of the Tanystropheidae. The following cladogram shows the results of their analysis that included ratio and ordered characters, excluding "T. antiquus", T. "conspicuus", and Czatkowiella due to their instability:

- Archosauromorpha
  - Jesairosaurus
  - - Protorosaurus
    - - Prolacerta
      - - - Dinocephalosauridae
            - Pectodens
            - Dinocephalosaurus
          - - Fuyuansaurus
            - Tanystropheidae
              - - Macrocnemus bassanii
                - - Macrocnemus fuyuanensis
                  - - Macrocnemus obristi
                    - Elessaurus
              - - - Amotosaurus
                  - Ozimek
                - - Sclerostropheus
                  - Langobardisaurus
                  - AMNH FARB 7206 (an unnamed Tanytrachelos-like tanystropheid from New Jersey)
                  - Tanytrachelos
                  - Gracilicollum
                  - - Tanystropheus hydroides
                    - GMPKU P 1527 (T. cf. hydroides)
                    - - Tanystropheus longobardicus
                      - Raibliania
        - Crocopoda
          - Allokotosauria
          - - Rhynchosauria
            - - Teyujagua
              - Archosauriformes

== Paleobiology ==
=== Neck and feeding ===
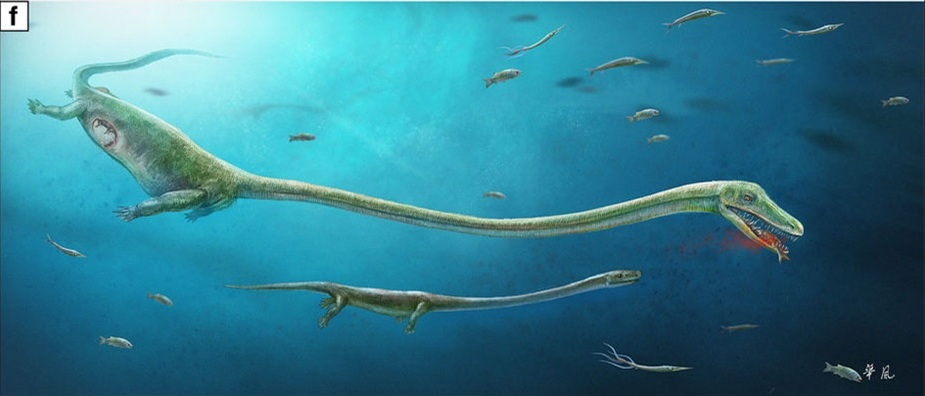
Life reconstruction of LPV 30280, shown eating a perleidid fish and bearing an embryo

The long neck of Dinocephalosaurus probably served a functional role. In particular, the length of the neck places a long distance between the head and the remainder of the body. This would have allowed Dinocephalosaurus to approach potential prey without the majority of its bulk being detected, which would have been effective in the murky waters of its habitat.

In 2004, Li and colleagues suggested that Dinocephalosaurus may also have used its neck to capture its prey via suction feeding. After flexing its neck to the side (which would have been facilitated by the slenderness of the cervical ribs), the act of straightening the neck would have caused the cervical ribs to splay outwards due to the action of the neck muscles attached to the ribs. As the head lunged forward, the volume of the esophagus would have increased, creating suction. Once the prey was caught, the fang-like teeth would have secured the prey in the mouth. However, in a response, Brigitte Demes and David Krause suggested that suction feeding would have involved the animal swallowing a large amount of saltwater as well as rapidly expanding its esophagus. Without evidence for adaptations to either behaviour (salt glands for the former, a large hyoid bone or specialised ribs for the latter), they considered the suggestion of Li and colleagues to be unlikely. Nevertheless, like other aquatic amniotes, Dinocephalosaurus would have swallowed and digested its prey head-first, as evidenced by the preservation of a perleidid fish in the abdominal region of LPV 30280 from Luoping.

It is not likely that Dinocephalosaurus used its long neck for breathing by extending it vertically. If it tried to do so, the difference in pressure between the surface and its torso would be sufficiently extreme such that its lungs would not have inflated. Thus, in order to breathe, Dinocephalosaurus would need to approach the surface with a nearly horizontal neck. The horizontal posture of the neck would also have facilitated locomotion at the surface, due to its long profile increasing its "hull length" and reducing the effect of resistance from waves.

=== Reproduction ===
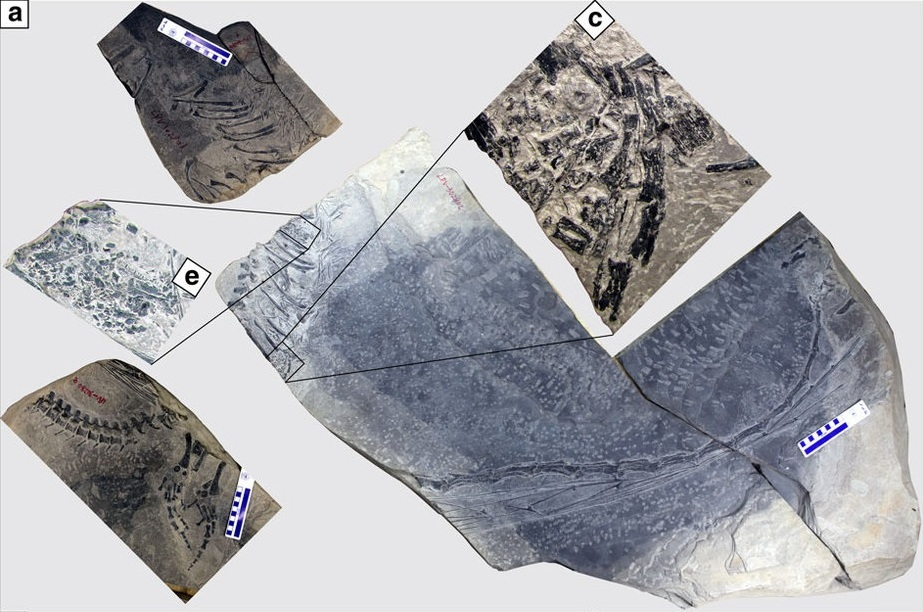
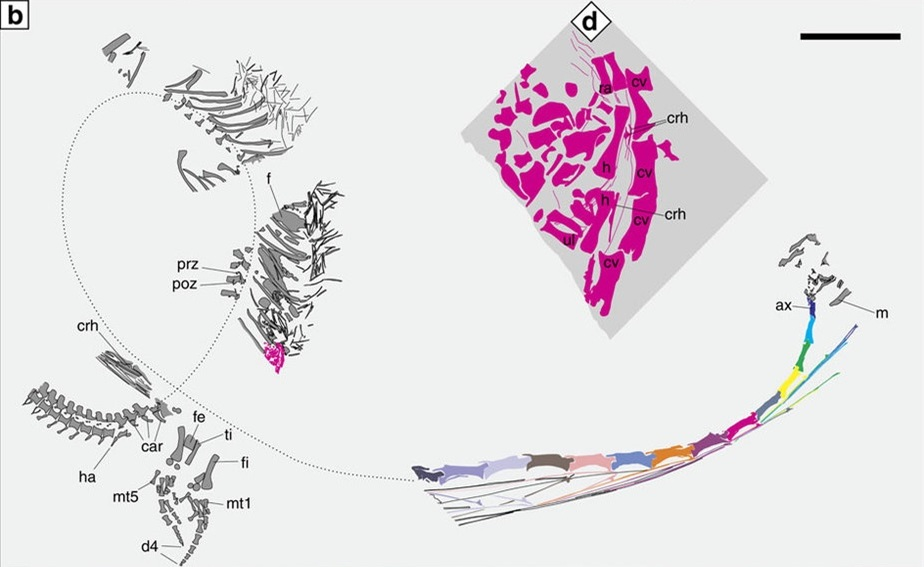
Photograph (a) and interpretive drawing (b) of specimen LPV 30280, which contains an embryo (c) and a perleidid fish (e)

Dinocephalosaurus represents the climax of aquatic adaptations among the protorosaurs. Given its long neck and paddle-like limbs, it was probably incapable of functioning comfortably in a terrestrial environment. In 2021, Ryosuke Motani and Geerat Vermeij categorised this as the fourth in a five-step sequence of increasing adaptations to marine environments based on modern animals as analogues, whereas tanystropheids were only at the second step (feeding in the ocean). One consequence of these adaptations is that Dinocephalosaurus would have been incapable of building nests on land. This would also have prevented it from possessing hard-shelled reptilian eggs; such eggs necessitate the exchange of gases with the outside environment, and this process is significantly slower in water than it is in air. Thus, Dinocephalosaurus could not have been oviparous. At the same time, however, archosaurs are known for the total absence of viviparous, or live birth, among its living members.

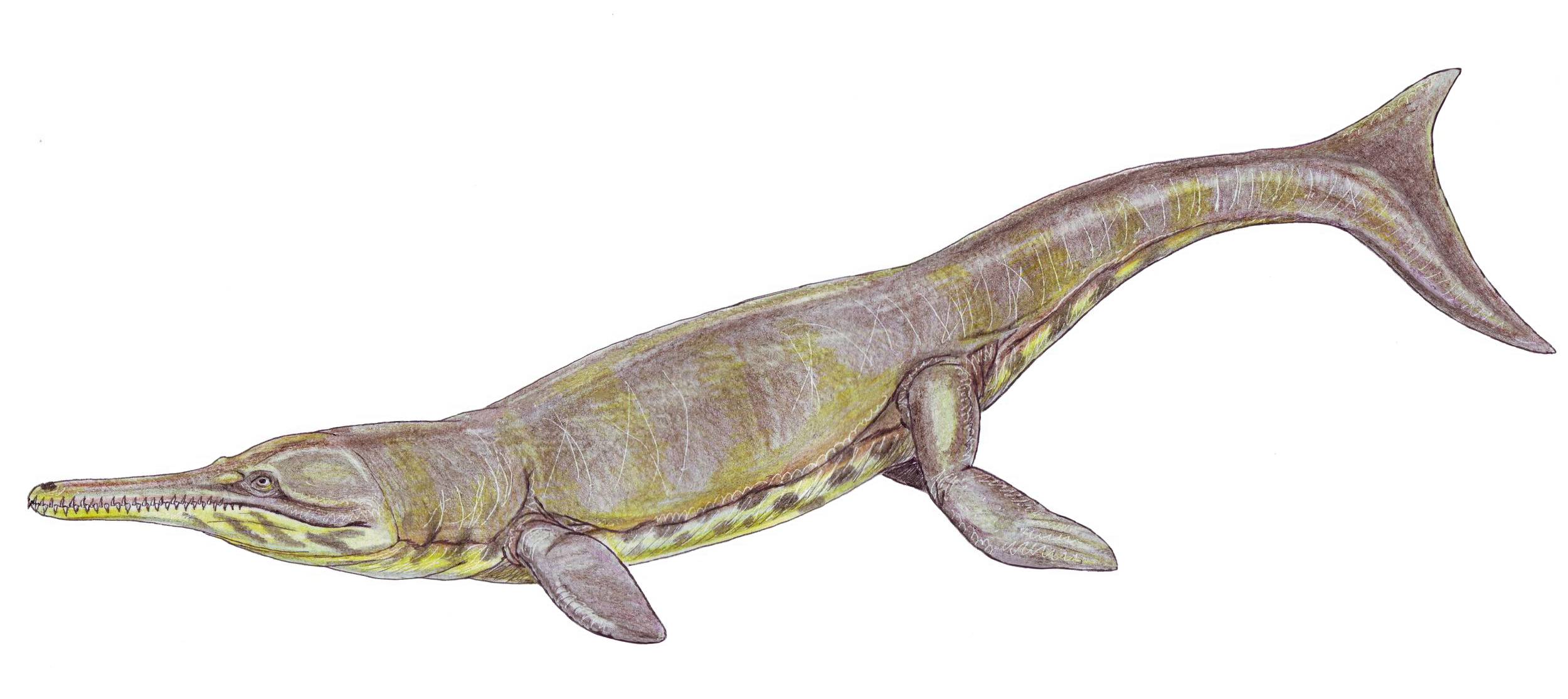
Aside from Dinocephalosaurus, metriorhynchids such as Metriorhynchus represent the only viviparous archosauromorphs

The embryonic individual of Dinocephalosaurus preserved inside LPV 30280 from Luoping can be identified as such for several reasons. First, it is enclosed entirely within the body cavity of the adult. Its cervical ribs - which are long, like that of the adult - face the same direction as the dorsal vertebrae of the adult, which is in contradiction to the typical head-first method of swallowing prey among amniotes. It is also preserved with its neck curling towards its forelimbs, a posture which is seen among vertebrate embryos but not adult Dinocephalosaurus specimens, which generally have the neck bent upwards. The absence of hands associated with the forelimbs in the embryo may be an artifact of preservation, but it may also be due to the sequence in which the limb bones of tetrapods ossify.

Although the presence of an embryo per se would be equivocal regarding this issue, the conditions in which the embryo were preserved provide strong evidence that Dinocephalosaurus was viviparous. There is no preserved calcified eggshell surrounding the embryo, despite the presence of delicately-preserved calcified elements from other animals at Luoping. This is consistent with the eggshells surrounding the embryos of viviparous reptiles being non-calcified membranes. Furthermore, the relative proportions of the humerus and the fibula in the embryo, compared with the maternal individual and IVPP V13898 from Panxian, indicate that the embryo is around 12% of the size of its mother. Combined with its ossified bones, this suggests that the embryo was at an advanced developmental stage, whereas crocodilians, birds, turtles, and tuataras lay eggs at very early developmental stages.

Overall, the evidence provided by the embryo suggests that Dinocephalosaurus was viviparous, making it the first viviparous archosauromorph asides from possibly metriorhynchids. This is consistent with the separation of its sacral ribs from its sacrum, which indicates a mobile pelvis that could have functioned in giving birth. While the otherwise absence of viviparous archosaurs has been historically attributed to common attributes inherited from the archosaurian stem-lineage, the discovery that Dinocephalosaurus was viviparous suggests that this phenomenon is due to lineage-specific lifestyle restrictions. Although the sex-determination systems among living archosauromorphs are diverse, with crocodilians and turtles using temperature-dependent sex determination, phylogenetic modelling suggests that Dinocephalosaurus retained the basal condition of genotypic sex determination from early diapsids, and that this system facilitated its transition to an obligately marine lifestyle alongside viviparity.

== Paleoecology ==
Until at least the end of the Middle Triassic, high sea levels enabled shallow water to cover much of the South China Block, a tectonic plate that today consists of the stable Yangtze Craton and the less stable South China Fold Belt. A mountain-building event known as the Indosinian orogeny uplifted Precambrian rocks to form four major landmasses on the South China Block: Khamdian to the west, Jiangnan in the centre, Yunkai to the south, and Cathaysia to the east. Island chains also stretched between Yunkai and Cathaysia in the east. Located between Khamdian and Jiangnan was a deep oceanic basin known as the Nanpanjiang Basin. Along the western edge of this basin, fossil-bearing sediments were laid down to become what are now the Lagerstätten (sedimentary deposits characterized by exemplary preservation) of Panxian, Luoping, and other localities.

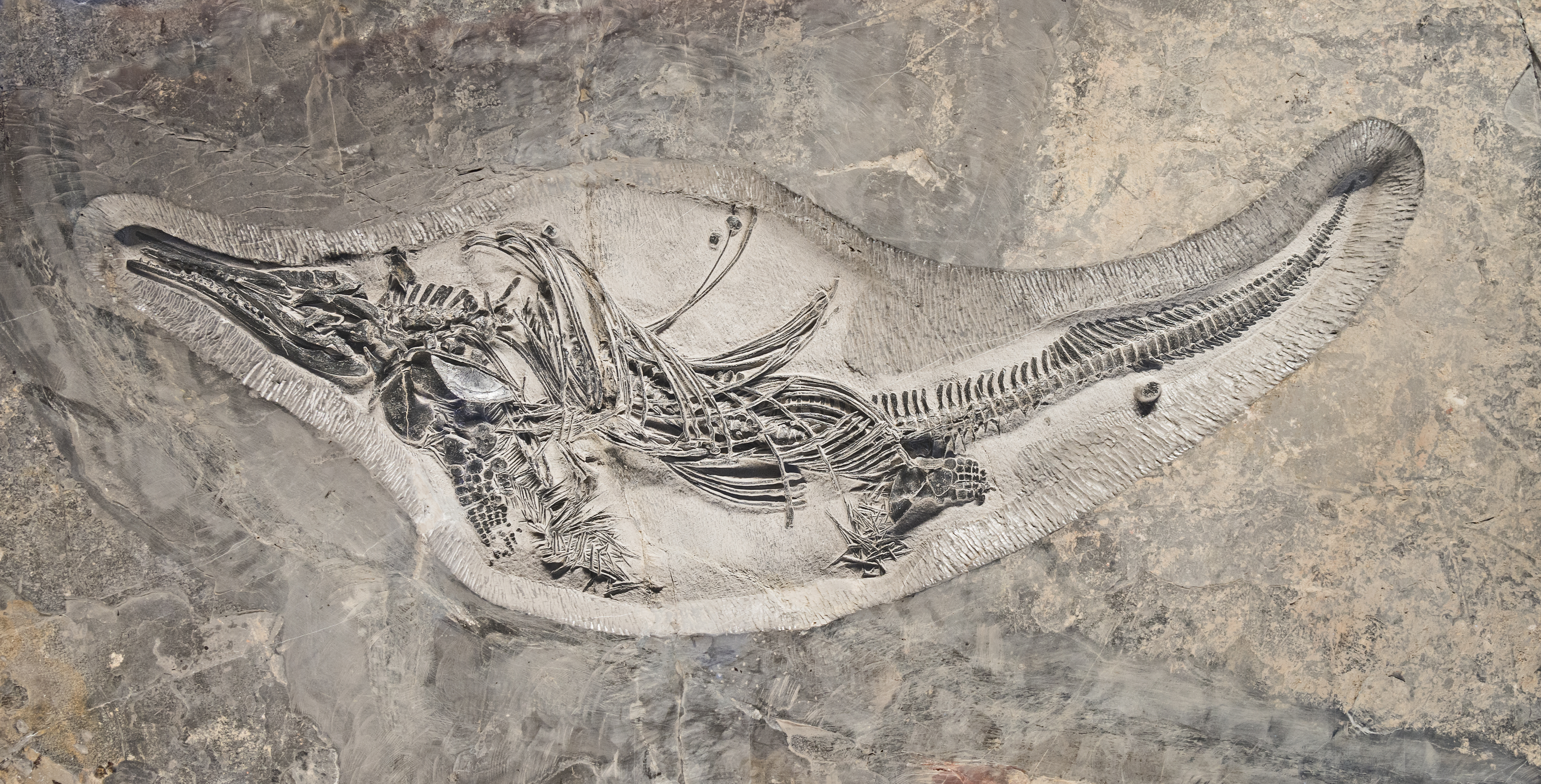
The mixosaurian ichthyosaur Mixosaurus (or Barracudasauroides) panxianensis is frequently present alongside Dinocephalosaurus

At Panxian, there appears to have been a transition in the endemic marine reptile fauna, possibly caused by volcanism. This volcanism is indicated by the presence of a bentonite layer between the Middle and Upper Reptile Horizons. From lower in the Upper Reptile Horizon, fossils have also been found of the ubiquitous mixosaurian ichthyosaur Mixosaurus panxianensis (which occurs in all layers), the pachypleurosaurs Keichousaurus sp. and Wumengosaurus delicatomandibularis, and fish, although fossils of the latter are fragmentary. The lower Middle and Lower Reptile Horizons also include the mixosaurian Phalarodon cf. fraasi, the primitive ichthyosaur Xinminosaurus catactes, the placodont Placodus inexpectatus, the nothosaurs Lariosaurus hongguoensis and Nothosaurus yangjuanensis, and the archosaur Qianosuchus mixtus, alongside bivalves and saurichthyid fish.

The fauna of Luoping appears to have been preserved in a small intraplatform basin instead of the surrounding open water, judging by the anoxic sediments present at the site. Out of 19,759 specimens, 93.7% of the fossils found at Luoping are arthropods: decapods, isopods, crab-like cycloids, shrimp-like mysidaceans, clam shrimp, and ostracods, as well as rare millipedes and horseshoe crabs. By comparison, only 0.07% of specimens come from marine reptiles, which include Dinocephalosaurus and Pectodens alongside the mixosaurians Mixosaurus cf. panxianensis and Phalarodon atavus; the pachypleurosaurs Dianmeisaurus gracilis and Dianopachysaurus dingi; the saurosphargids Largocephalosaurus polycarpon and Sinosaurosphargis yunguiensis; the nothosaurs Nothosaurus zhangi and a species of Lariosaurus; other sauropterygians Atopodentatus unicus, Dawazisaurus brevis, and Diandongosaurus acutidentatus; and an archosaur related to Qianosuchus. Otherwise, fish including saurichthyids, palaeoniscids, birgeriids, perleidids, eugnathids, semionotids, pholidopleurids, peltopleurids, and coelacanths have been found at Luoping, forming 3.66% of fossils with 25 taxa in 9 families. Molluscs such as bivalves and gastropods, along with ammonoids and belemnoids, account for 1.69% of specimens. Rare and probably non-endemic fossils also include echinoderms such as crinoids, starfish, and sea urchins; branchiopods; and relatively complete conifer branches and leaves, which probably originated from coastal forests less than 10 km (6.2 mi) away.
