= Megacnemus =

Megacnemus Temporal range: Middle Triassic, 245–240 Ma

Scientific classification
- Domain: Eukaryota
- Kingdom: Animalia
- Phylum: Chordata
- Class: Reptilia
- Clade: Archosauromorpha
- Genus: †Megacnemus; Huene, 1954

Species
- † M. grandis Huene, 1954 (type)

Extinct genus of reptiles

Megacnemus is an extinct genus of archosauromorph reptile. Megacnemus is an enigmatic and poorly described genus, known from a single bone. The type species of Megacnemus, Megacnemus grandis, was named by Friedrich von Huene in 1954. The holotype of Megacnemus (GPIMUH 253) is a limb bone, believed to be a femur. Although the exact locality from which this bone was unearthed is unknown, it is believed to have come from Middle Triassic deposits near Gogolin, in southwest Poland. As the bone is more than 20 centimeters long, Megacnemus may have been quite large, similar to Vritraminosaurus in size.

The purported femur differs from those of other basal archosauromorphs in the fact that it is quite robust and straight, contrasting with the more sigmoidally curved femurs of Protorosaurus, Macrocnemus, and tanystropheids. However, it does share some similarities with the humeri of Dinocephalosaurus and Macrocnemus, such as expanded distal and proximal ends, a straight preaxial edge, and a concave postaxial edge, although the ends of the bone are less rounded than those of these taxa. The bone also resembles the humerus of Boreopricea, although it is more flattened.
