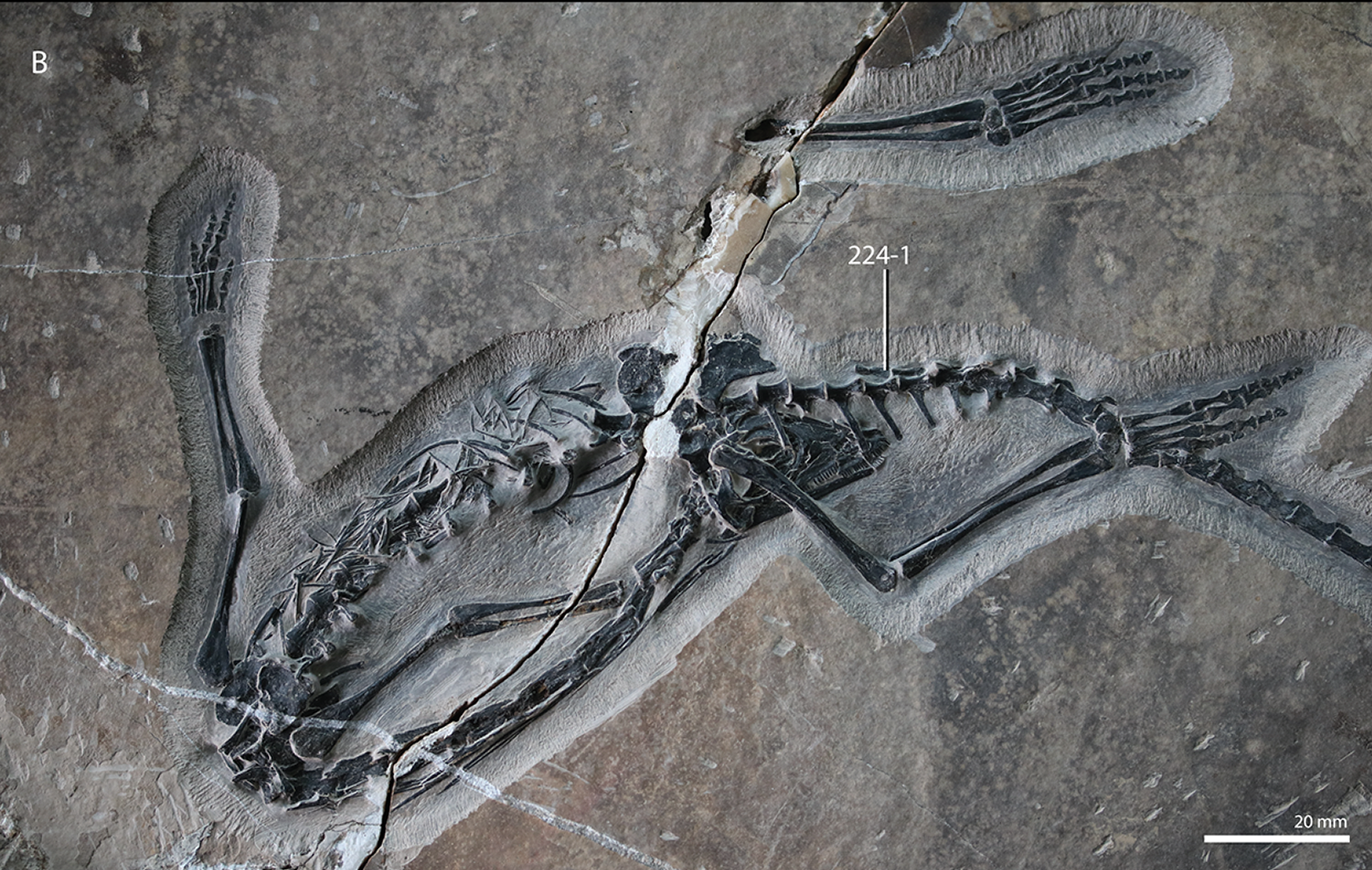
- Holotype fossil

Scientific classification
- Kingdom: Animalia
- Phylum: Chordata
- Class: Reptilia
- Family: †Trachelosauridae
- Genus: †Pectodens; Li et al., 2017

Type species
- Pectodens zhenyuensis Li et al., 2017

= Pectodens =

Pectodens Temporal range: Anisian, 244 Ma

Extinct genus of reptiles

Pectodens (meaning "comb tooth") is an extinct genus of archosauromorph reptile which lived during the Middle Triassic in China. The type and only species of the genus is P. zhenyuensis, named by Chun Li and colleagues in 2017. It was a member of the Archosauromorpha, specifically part of the unnatural grouping Protorosauria. However, an unusual combination of traits similar (such as the long neck) and dissimilar (such as the absence of a hook on the fifth metatarsal bone) to other protorosaurs initially led to confusion over its evolutionary relationships. In 2021, it was placed in a newly-established group, Dinocephalosauridae, along with its closest relative Dinocephalosaurus.

A small, slender animal measuring 38 centimetres (15 in) long, Pectodens was named after the peculiar comb-like arrangement of long, conical teeth present in its mouth. Unlike Dinocephalosaurus and the other reptiles that it was preserved with, well-developed joints and claw-like digits indicate that Pectodens was entirely terrestrial. However, its presence in marine deposits suggests that lived relatively close to the coastline. Its skeleton was also poorly ossified, which is typically a trait of aquatic animals, but this may have been due to the young age of the only known specimen instead.

== Discovery and naming ==
Pectodens is known from one specimen, consisting of a well-preserved and almost complete skeleton. The fossil is preserved on two separate blocks that broke cleanly, but details of the pelvis were lost in the process. Additionally, the left femur is missing, as is part of one cervical. The specimen is catalogued as IVPP V18578, being stored in the Institute of Vertebrate Paleontology and Paleoanthropology in Beijing, China. It was described by Chun Li, Nicholas Fraser, Olivier Rieppel, Li-Jun Zhao, and Li-Ting Wang in a 2017 research paper published in the Journal of Paleontology.

The specimen itself was found in Luoping County in Yunnan, China. It is part of the "Panxian-Luoping fauna", a faunal assemblage which is part of Member II of the Anisian (Middle Triassic) Guanling Formation. Conodont biostratigraphy (based on the presence of Nicoraella kockeli) and radiometric dating have dated the assemblage in Luoping to 244 million years old. Predominant deposits in Member II of the Guanling Formation consist of grey layers of marly limestone and limestone.

In their 2017 description of IVPP V18578, Li and colleagues named the new genus Pectodens, from Latin pecto- ("comb") and dens ("tooth"), in reference to the animal's characteristic comb-like arrangement of elongated teeth. They also named the type species Pectodens zhenyuensis after Zhenyu Li, who had assisted with the collection of the specimen.

== Description ==
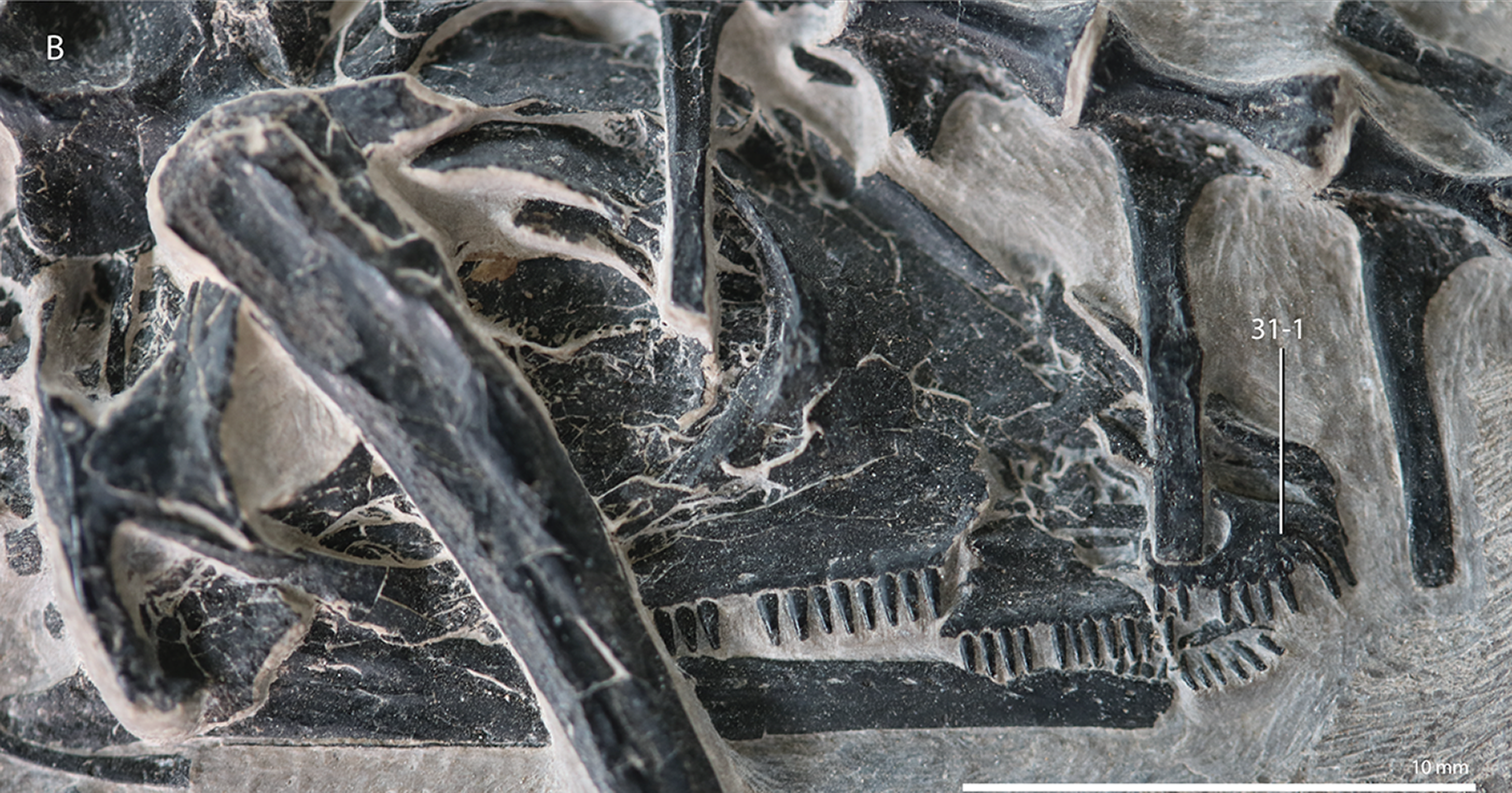
Skull

Size comparison of Pectodens compared to a human hand

Pectodens was a small animal with a slender build, measuring roughly 38 centimetres (15 in) long. Overall, its skeleton was poorly ossified, although this may have been a consequence of the young age of the specimen. The skull measured 25.7 mm (1.01 in) long, while the lower jaw was probably 25–26 mm (0.98–1.02 in) long when complete. Uniquely, numerous conical teeth in the jaws of Pectodens formed a comb-like structure. These teeth had weakly-developed broad enamel ridges. There were 10 teeth in each premaxilla at the front of the jaw, and at least 24 more on the maxilla further back. There were also teeth on the palate, with at least 15 being present on the pterygoid bone. Additionally, the eye socket was very large, measuring 10.5 mm (0.41 in) long, although this again may have been due to the animal's immaturity. Meanwhile, the rear (temporal) region of the skull was quite short. Similar to Dinocephalosaurus, the bony nostrils of Pectodens were retracted from the tip of the snout by the width of the premaxilla, and both lacked the backward-pointing process of the jugal bone seen in other archosauromorph reptiles.

The neck and tail of Pectodens were long, with the former being the same length as the torso. In life, it had 66 to 68 vertebrae, with 11-12 neck vertebrae, 11-13 back vertebrae, 2 hip vertebrae, and 41 tail vertebrae. The neck vertebrae had low neural spines, like Tanystropheus. The neck ribs were generally also long, having short forward processes and long rear processes that bridged two to three vertebral joints each. Similar to Dinocephalosaurus, Czatkowiella, Sclerostropheus, and Tanytrachelos, the forward processes were free of the vertebral bodies and extended to the preceding vertebrae. Meanwhile, the transverse processes of the back vertebrae were uniquely long and pronounced, ending in sub-circular facet joints that connected with the rounded heads of the ribs. Also like Tanystropheus, the transverse processes of the tail became gradually reduced alongside the forward processes of the chevrons, disappearing by the 35th tail vertebra.

Like Tanystropheus and Macrocnemus, the scapula was low-slung with a half-moon shape unique among archosauromorphs. Like Tanystropheus, Macrocnemus, Amotosaurus, Langobardisaurus and Planocephalosaurus, there was a notch in the bottom of the ischium that demarcated a rear projection. The long bones of the forelimbs had expanded and robust top ends; the deltopectoral crest on the humerus was also rather prominent. The humerus was longer than the ulna and radius, while the tibia and fibula were conversely slightly longer than the femur. An empty gap in the wrist of an otherwise articulated hand suggests that not all of the wrist bones were ossified due to immaturity. Likewise, the distal tarsals also appear to have been missing from the ankle, but the remaining bones articulated directly with the foot. Unusually, there was no "hook" on the fifth metatarsal bone, unlike Tanystropheus. The hands and feet each had five digits, with the five digits respectively having 2, 3, 4, 5, and 4 phalanges (although there may have only been 3 in the fifth digits of the hands).

== Classification ==
Protorosauria was a diverse group of archosauromorph reptiles that lived during the Permian and Triassic periods. The classification of Pectodens was complicated by the presence of both characteristics similar to the Protorosauria as well as characteristics which would be expected in a more basal (less specialised) archosauromorph. Like Tanystropheus, Macrocnemus, and other protorosaurs, the neck vertebrae were long with low neural spines, and bore cervical ribs that bridged multiple joints. These same characteristics previously allowed Li, Fraser, and Rieppel to assign Dinocephalosaurus to the Protorosauria. Yet, in Pectodens, the puboischiadic plate in the hip (formed from the pubis and ischium) did not appear to bear a perforation known as the thyroid fenestra, the astragalus and calcaneum of the ankle were simple and rounded, and the fifth metatarsal was not hooked.

Poor preservation in some regions also hampered the classification of Pectodens. The blocks containing the type specimen had split through the puboischiadic plate, for instance; the neural spines of the back vertebrar were also not visible, which means that they could not be compared with those of the Tanystropheidae (which were tall and elongated). Also, the uncertainty in the number of phalanges in the fifth digit of the hand had an impact; most protorosaurs had three, while Pectodens may have had three or four depending on whether a breakage is interpreted as obscuring one single phalanx or two overlapping phalanges. Considering all of this uncertainty, Li and colleagues thus only tentatively considered Pectodens a protorosaur.

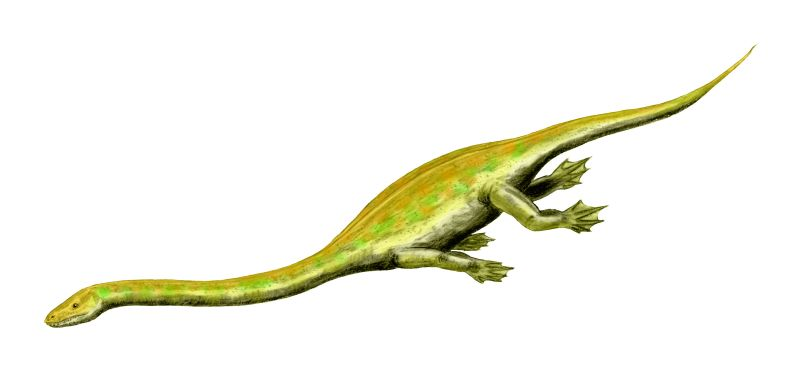
The aquatic Dinocephalosaurus was the closest relative of Pectodens in the Dinocephalosauridae

Nevertheless, a number of subsequent phylogenetic analyses included Pectodens. Starting in the 2000s, the Protorosauria was increasingly being considered as not forming a natural monophyletic grouping, with the defining genus of Protorosaurus considered as having been more basal (less specialised) than other traditional members of the group. The opposite was also true of Prolacerta, which was used to define the alternate grouping Prolacertiformes. In 2018, a phylogenetic analysis by Martín Ezcurra and Richard J. Butler found Pectodens in a large polytomy with other members of the Tanystropheidae, with Dinocephalosaurus and Trachelosaurus being the sister groups of Tanystropheidae. In 2021, Stephan Spiekman and colleagues performed multiple analyses using new datasets that incorporated different species and anatomical characteristics. They consistently found a group formed by Pectodens and Dinocephalosaurus, which they named Dinocephalosauridae after the latter. Some variants of their analysis found either Sclerostropheus or "Tanystropheus" antiquus as members of the Dinocephalosauridae, and either Fuyuansaurus or Jesairosaurus as their closest relative. Other analyses found these, with the exception of Jesairosaurus, to be tanystropheids. The phylogenetic tree recovered by one of their analyses is shown below.

- Archosauromorpha
  - Protorosaurus
  - - Prolacerta
    - - Jesairosaurus
      - Dinocephalosauridae
        - Pectodens
        - Dinocephalosaurus
    - Tanystropheidae
      - - Macrocnemus bassanii
        - Macrocnemus fuyuanensis
      - - Macrocnemus obristi
        - - Langobardisaurus
          - - Fuyuansaurus
            - - Augustaburiania
              - - Amotosaurus
                - - Ozimek
                  - - Sclerostropheus
                    - Raibliania
          - - - AMNH FARB 7206 (referred to Tanytrachelos)
              - Tanytrachelos
            - - Tanystropheus hydroides
              - GMPKU P 1527 (referred to T. hydroides)
              - Tanystropheus longobardicus
  - Crocopoda
    - Allokotosauria
    - Rhynchosauria
    - - Teyujagua
      - Archosauriformes

== Paleobiology ==
Judging by the slender limbs with robust joints and claw-tipped elongate digits, Pectodens was most likely an entirely terrestrial animal. It exhibits no adaptations for an aquatic lifestyle, unlike other archosauromorphs in the Panxian-Luoping biota (the amphibious Qianosuchus, for instance, or the marine Dinocephalosaurus).

== Paleoecology ==
Pectodens on the land surrounding a shallow sea that covered much of southern China during the Middle Triassic. Four major landmasses were present in this region, which had been formed by a mountain-building event known as the Indosinian orogeny: Khamdian to the west, Jiangnan occupying a central position, Yunkai to the south, and Cathaysia to the east. The Lagerstätten of Panxian and Luoping were laid down as fossil-bearing sediments on the western edge of an oceanic basin located between Khamdian and Jiangnan, known as the Nanpanjiang Basin. All of these geological features are part of the South China Block, a tectonic plate presently composed of the Yangtze Craton and the South China Fold Belt.

Although Pectodens was fully terrestrial, it was preserved alongside the other fauna of Luoping within a small oceanic intraplatform basin, in which preservation was facilitated by the presence of anoxic sediments. Reptiles constitute a minority of fossils, at 0.07% of 19,759 specimens found at Luoping. They include Pectodens and Dinocephalosaurus along with the mixosaurian ichthyosaurs Mixosaurus cf. panxianensis and Phalarodon atavus; the pachypleurosaurs Dianmeisaurus gracilis and Dianopachysaurus dingi; the saurosphargids Largocephalosaurus polycarpon and Sinosaurosphargis yunguiensis; the nothosaurs Nothosaurus zhangi and a species of Lariosaurus; other sauropterygians Atopodentatus unicus, Dawazisaurus brevis, and Diandongosaurus acutidentatus; and an archosaur related to Qianosuchus. By comparison, 93.7% of Luoping's fossils are arthropods, including decapods, isopods, cycloids, mysidaceans, clam shrimp, ostracods, millipedes, and horseshoe crabs. Fish consist of 25 taxa in 9 families and form 3.66% of fossil specimens, including saurichthyids, palaeoniscids, birgeriids, perleidids, eugnathids, semionotids, pholidopleurids, peltopleurids, and coelacanths. Molluscs, including bivalves and gastropods account for 1.69% alongside ammonoids and belemnoids. Echinoderms such as crinoids, starfish, and sea urchins, as well as branchiopods, are rare, and probably did not originate from local waters. Branches and leaves from conifers have also been found, representing coastal forests located less than 10 km (6.2 mi) away from the intraplatform basin. The proximity of the shoreline to this basin is supported by the occurrence of Pectodens.
