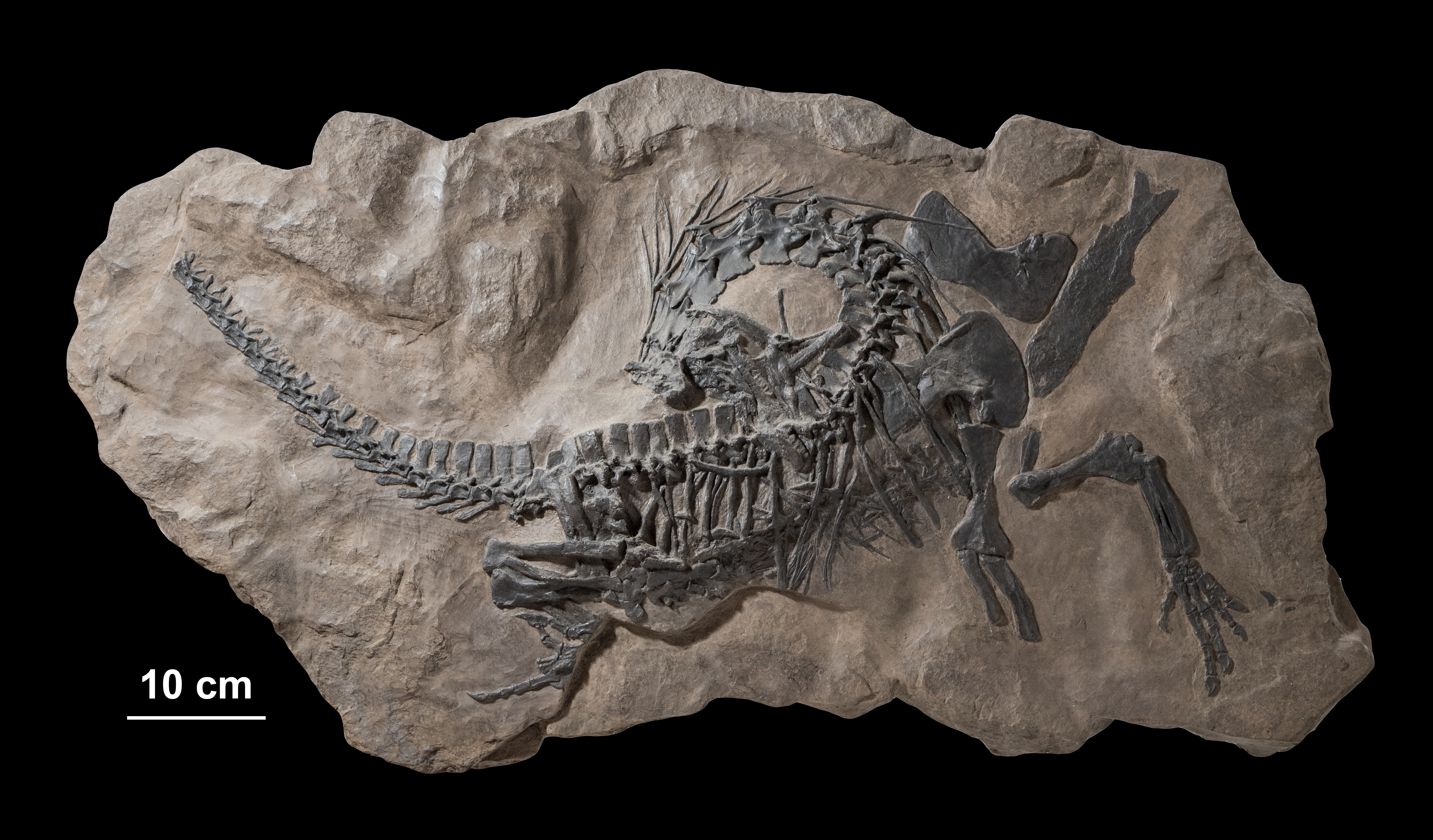
- Fossil specimen of Protorosaurus speneri, Teyler's Museum
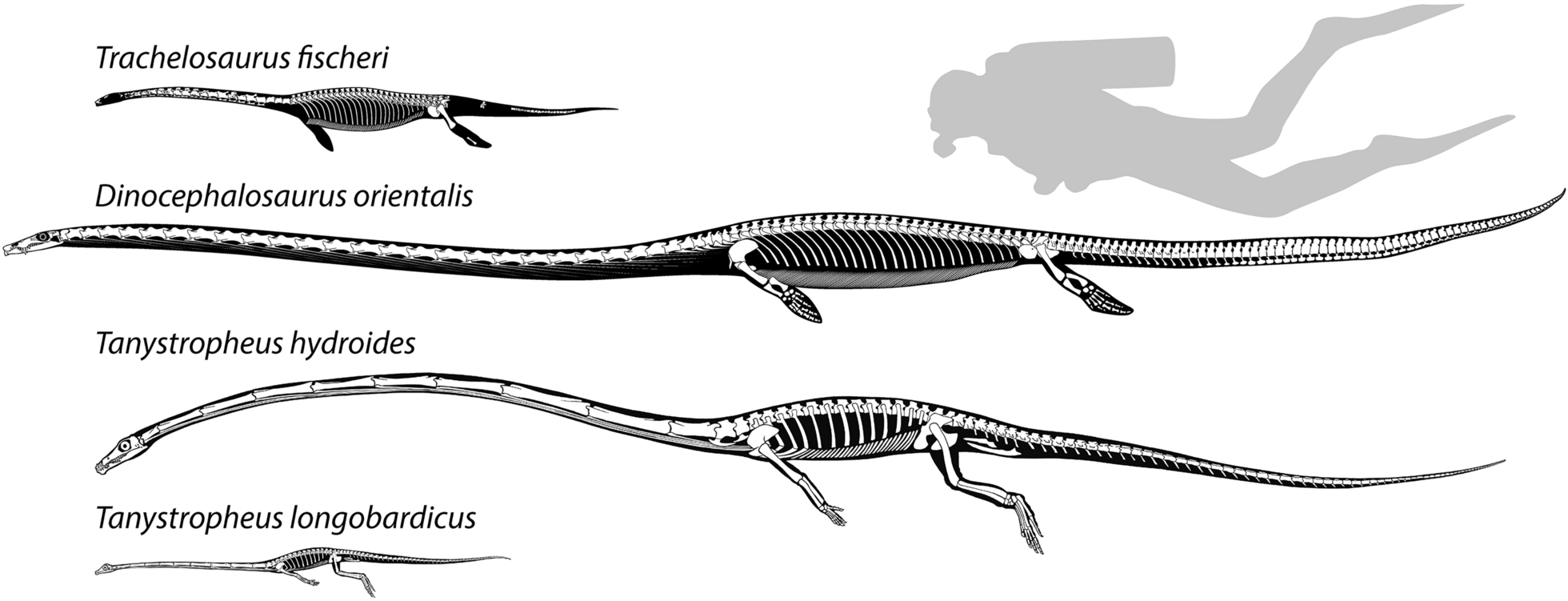
- Skeletal reconstructions of various members of Tanysauria, including Trachelosaurus fischeri, Dinocephalosaurus orientalis, Tanystropheus hydroides, and Tanystropheus longobardicus

Scientific classification
- Kingdom: Animalia
- Phylum: Chordata
- Class: Reptilia
- Clade: Archosauromorpha
- Order: †Protorosauria; Huxley, 1871

Subtaxa
- †Czatkowiella; †Exilisuchus?; †Jesairosaurus; †Malutinisuchus; †Mecistotrachelos?; †Megacnemus; †Microcnemus; †Protorosaurus; †Rhombopholis; †Tanysauria; Pantestudines?

= Protorosauria =

Protorosaurs Temporal range: Latest Middle Permian - Late Triassic, 260–201.3 Ma Possible descendant taxon Pantestudines survives to present

Extinct order of reptiles

Protorosauria is an extinct, likely paraphyletic group of basal archosauromorph reptiles from the latest Middle Permian (Capitanian stage) to the end of the Late Triassic (Rhaetian stage) of Asia, Europe and North America. It was named by the English anatomist and paleontologist Thomas Henry Huxley in 1871 as an order, originally to solely contain Protorosaurus. Other names which were once considered equivalent to Protorosauria include Prolacertiformes and Prolacertilia.

Protorosaurs are distinguished by their long necks formed by elongated cervical vertebrae, which have ribs that extend backward to the vertebrae behind them. Protorosaurs also have a gap between the quadrate bones and the jugal bones in the back of the skull near the jaw joint, making their skulls resemble those of lizards. While previously thought to be monophyletic, the group is now thought to consist of various groups of basal archosauromorph reptiles that lie outside Crocopoda, though some recent studies have recovered the group as monophyletic. A number of members of Protorosauria have been found to belong to a monophyletic group (though not including Protorosaurus) which was named Tanysauria in 2024.. In 2026. Jenkins et al found strong support on morphological grounds for Pantestudines to be nested within Archosauromorpha, with its ancestor being "protosaurian"-like, which is supported by some anatomical features of early Pantestudines.

== Classification ==
Protorosauria was considered to be a synonym of Prolacertiformes for many years.

Since 1998, many phylogenetic analyses have found Protorosauria, as used in its widest sense, to be a polyphyletic or paraphyletic taxon. Protorosaurus, Macrocnemus, tanystropheids, and various other protorosaurs are usually placed near the base of Archosauromorpha, while Prolacerta and Pamelaria, two Gondwanan Triassic protorosaurs, are now thought to be in a more derived position as close relatives of Archosauriformes. Most phylogenetic analyses since 1998 have found a strongly supported clade that includes only the genus Prolacerta and the Archosauriformes.

For this reason Prolacerta, Pamelaria, and several other related forms (collectively called prolacertids) have been removed from Protorosauria. Because the name Prolacertiformes is defined based on the genus Prolacerta, the name Protorosauria is used for the remaining group.

Only recently has Protorosauria been defined in a phylogenetic sense as the most inclusive clade containing taxa such as Protorosaurus, Macrocnemus, and Tanystropheus. Analyses, such as Dilkes (1998), Sues (2003), Modesto & Sues (2004), Rieppel, Fraser & Nosotti (2003), Rieppel, Li & Fraser (2008), Gottmann-Quesada and Sander (2009) and Renesto et al. (2010), recovered a large Protorosauria, that includes Protorosaurus, Drepanosauridae (and relatives) and Tanystropheidae (and relatives). However, some analysis found Protorosaurus (and sometimes the closely related Czatkowiella) to be more advanced or more basal than the node Drepanosauridae+Tanystropheidae, but always more basal than Prolacerta.

Some studies still use the term Prolacertiformes to include prolacertids and traditional protorosaurs, while restricting the term Protorosauria to the smallest clade that includes Protorosaurus, Macrocnemus, and Tanystropheus; thus Protorosauria is a true clade, while Prolacertiformes is an evolutionary grade of early archosauromorphs.

Pritchard et al. (2015), Nesbitt et al. (2015), Ezcurra (2016) and Spiekman et al., 2021 found that even this definition of Protorosauria, like Prolacertiformes, was an unnatural group of various non-Crocopodan archosauromorphs. These studies found that tanystropheids were archosauromorphs more closely related to crocopods than to Protorosaurus. Nevertheless, Ezcurra noted that archosauromorph systematics required further study, and that phylogenetic support for Protorosauria being a natural group was only barely weaker than the support for the group being unnatural.

=== Included groups ===
The Protorosauria includes the Permian genus Protorosaurus, closely related to Czatkowiella. A wide variety of Permian and Triassic reptiles have been classified within Protorosauria, including the arboreal gliding reptile Sharovipteryx and the aquatic tanystropheids, which have extremely long necks.

Another enigmatic group of Triassic reptiles, the Drepanosauromorpha, have often been classified as belonging to the Protorosauria.

Pterosaurs have also been proposed as protorosaurs or close relatives of them, although they are now regarded as a more derived group of archosaurs.

While Senter (2004) reassigned the bizarre, arboreal drepanosaurids and Longisquama to a group of more primitive diapsids called Avicephala, subsequent studies failed to find the same result, instead supporting the hypothesis that they were protorosaurs.

== Cladogram ==
The following cladogram shows the position of Protorosauria among the Sauria sensu Sean P. Modesto and Hans-Dieter Sues (2004).

- - Petrolacosaurus
  - - Youngina
    - - Choristodera
        - Lazarussuchus
        - - Champsosaurus
          - Cteniogenys
      - Sauria
        - Lepidosauromorpha
          - Gephyrosaurus
          - Squamata
        - Archosauromorpha
          - Protorosauria
            - Protorosaurus
            - Drepanosauridae
              - Drepanosaurus
              - Megalancosaurus
            - Tanystropheidae
              - Macrocnemus
              - - Langobardisaurus
                - Tanystropheus longobardicus
          - - Trilophosaurus
            - - Rhynchosauria
                - Howesia
                - Mesosuchus
              - - Prolacerta
                - Archosauriformes
                  - Proterosuchus
                  - Euparkeria

Most recent studies have recovered Protorosauria as a whole as a paraphyletic, cladogram after Spiekman et al. 2021

- Diapsida
  - Araeoscelidia
  - Neodiapsida
    - Orovenator
    - - Claudiosaurus
      - - Acerosodontosaurus
        - - Youngina
          - Sauria
            - Lepidosauromorpha
            - Archosauromorpha
              - Jesairosaurus
              - - Protorosaurus
                - - Prolacerta
                  - - - - - Czatkowiella
                          - Sharovipterygidae (Ozimek)
                        - - Fuyuansaurus
                          - Dinocephalosauridae
                            - Protanystropheus
                            - Pectodens
                            - Dinocephalosaurus
                      - Tanystropheidae
                        - - Macrocnemus bassanii
                          - Macrocnemus fuyuanensis
                        - - - Augustaburiania
                            - Amotosaurus
                          - - Langobardisaurus
                            - AMNH FARB 7206
                            - - Sclerostropheus
                              - - Tanystropheus hydroides
                                - GMPKU P 1527 T. cf. hydroides
                                - Tanystropheus longobardicus
                    - Crocopoda
                      - Allokotosauria
                      - - Rhynchosauria
                        - - Teyujagua
                          - Archosauriformes

Although Protorosauria as a whole is often found to be a paraphyletic, a large group of former "protorosaurs" (excluding Protorosaurus) is frequently found to be monophyletic. This clade was given the name "Tanysauria" by Spiekman et al. in 2024.

- - Archosauromorpha
    - - Protorosaurus
      - Aenigmastropheus
    - - Tanysauria
        - Jesairosaurus
        - - Trachelosauridae
            - - Austronaga
              - Pectodens
            - - Fuyuansaurus
              - - Trachelosaurus
                - - Gracilicollum
                  - Dinocephalosaurus
          - Tanystropheidae
            - Augustaburiania
            - Luxisaurus
            - - - Macrocnemus bassanii
                - - Macrocnemus fuyuanensis
                  - Macrocnemus obristi
              - - UFRGS-PV-492-T
                - - Amotosaurus
                  - - Langobardisaurus
                    - - - Raibliania
                        - Tanystropheus spp.
                      - - Sclerostropheus
                        - - Ozimek
                          - Tanytrachelos
      - Crocopoda

Jenkins et al, 2026 found strong support on morphological grounds for Pantestudines to be nested within Archosauromorpha, more closely related to modern archosaurs than to classic early archosauromorph Protorosaurus, suggesting that the ancestor of Pantestudines was "protosaurian"-like, which is supported by some anatomical features of early Pantestudines. They also found Eunotosaurus to be a millerettid stem-reptile unrelated to Pantestudines.

- Sauropsida
  - †Araeoscelidia
  - - †Bolosauridae
    - - †Ankyramorpha
        - †Acleistorhinidae
        - †Procolophonia
          - †Pareiasauromorpha
          - †Procolophonoidea
      - - †Mesosauria
        - - - †Ascendonanus
            - †Orovenator
            - †Cabarzia
          - Parapleurota
            - †Millerettidae (including Eunotosaurus)
            - Neodiapsida
              - †Saurosternon
              - - †Younginidae
                - - †Tangasauridae
                  - - †Claudiosaurus
                    - - †Weigeltisauridae
                      - †Drepanosauromorpha
                      - Sauria Reptilia s. s.
                        - Lepidosauromorpha
                        - Archosauromorpha
                          - †Sauropterygia (including Plesiosauria)
                          - - †Protorosaurus
                            - Archelosauria
                              - Pantestudines
                              - - †Tanystropheidae
                                - - †Prolacerta
                                  - - †Allokotosauria
                                    - - †Rhynchosauria
                                      - - †Teyujagua
                                        - Archosauriformes (including Archosauria)
