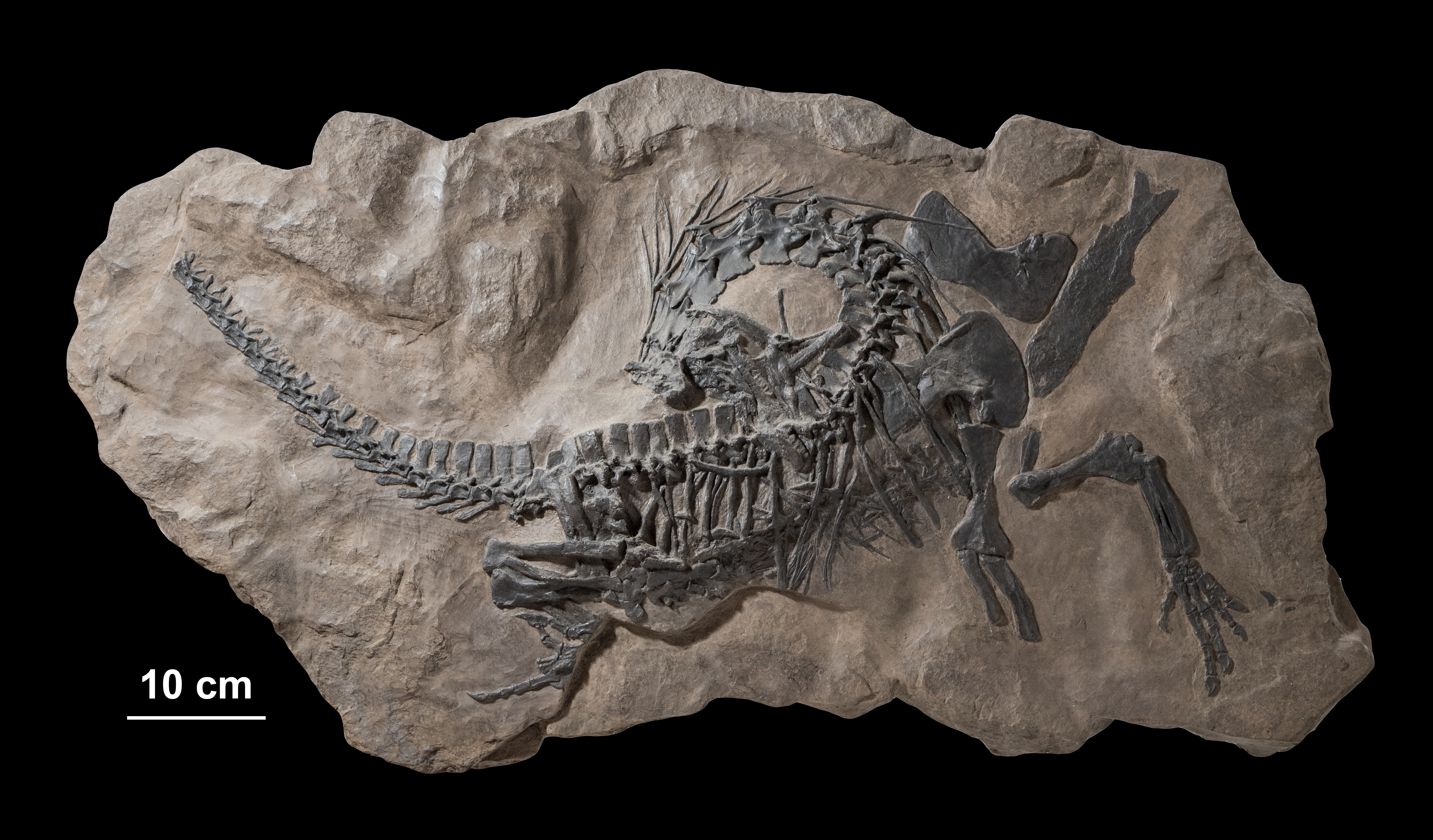
- Fossil specimen, Teyler's Museum
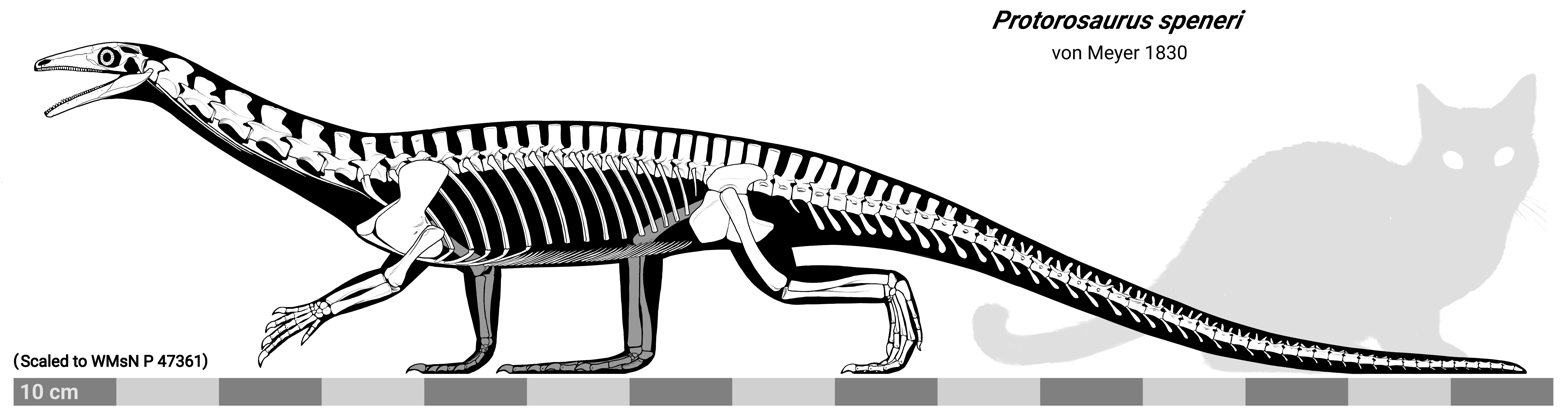
- Skeletal reconstruction from Jenkins et al., 2026

Scientific classification
- Kingdom: Animalia
- Phylum: Chordata
- Class: Reptilia
- Clade: Sauria
- Clade: Archosauromorpha
- Genus: †Protorosaurus von Meyer 1830
- Species: †P. speneri

Binomial name
- †Protorosaurus speneri von Meyer 1830

= Protorosaurus =

Protorosaurus Temporal range: Lopingian ~260–251 Ma

Extinct genus of reptiles

Protorosaurus (from Greek: πρότερος próteros, 'earlier' and Greek: σαῦρος saûros, 'lizard') is an extinct genus of reptile. Members of the genus lived during the late Permian period in what is now Germany and Great Britain. Once believed to have been an ancestor to lizards, Protorosaurus is now known to be one of the oldest and most primitive members of Archosauromorpha, the group that would eventually lead to archosaurs such as crocodilians and dinosaurs.

== Description ==
=== Skull and lower jaw ===
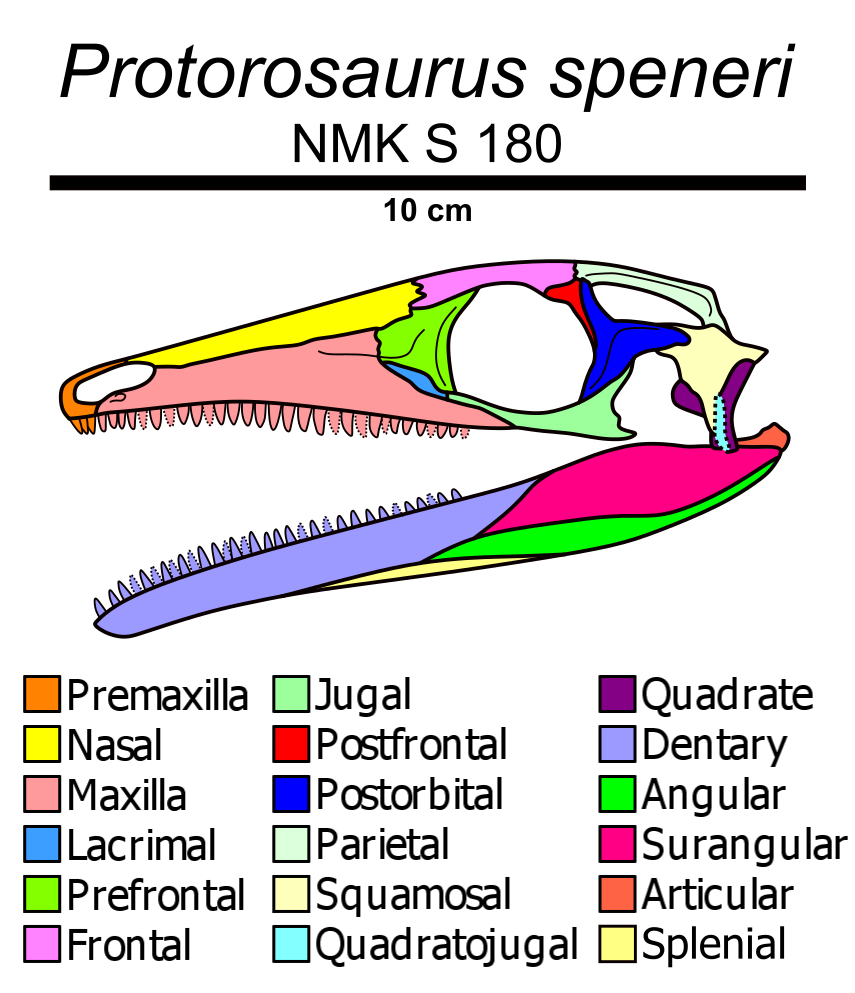
Skull diagram of NMK S 180

The skull is relatively elongate but shallow from top to bottom, with the part of the skull forward of the eye socket/orbit (antorbital region) being three times as long as the orbital region or the region of the skull behind the eye socket (postorbital region). The skull of Protorosaurus is characterised by a number of features, including: The parietal bones of the skull roof are fused, with a noticeable sagittal crest. The pineal foramen opening between the parietal bones is relatively small and elongate. On the lateral (outward facing) surface of the jugal bone small pits are present. Several characters are unique autapomorphies among non-archosauriform archosauromorphs, including a premaxilla bone (tooth bearing bone at the front of the snout) that is short from front to back along the length of the skull (anteroposteriorly), which bears three tooth sockets, as well as the parabasisphenoid bone bearing a intertuberal plate. The lower jaw lacks a coronoid process.

=== Postcranial skeleton ===
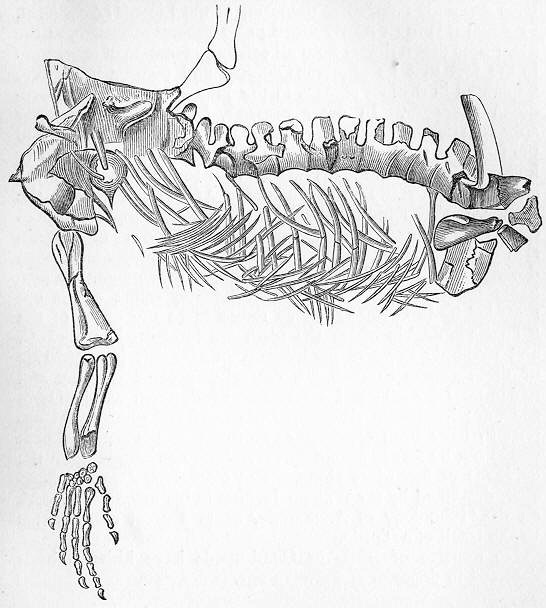
Skeleton illustration

Protorosaurus grew up to about 1.5–2 metres (4 ft 11 in – 6 ft 7 in) in length, and was a slender, lizard-like animal, vaguely resembling a monitor lizard, with long legs and like many other "protorosaurians", a relatively long neck composed of seven elongated cervical (neck) vertebrae. The neck vertebrae are amphicoelous (having concave faces on both ends), and all but the first (the atlas) bear cervical ribs, which appear to have projected backwards along the length of the neck. There are at least 18 dorsal vertebrae, with corresponding ribs, There are at least 39 amphicoelous caudal (tail) vertebrae, though no complete tail is known, so a complete tail may have had 50-70 vertebrae in total. The caudal vertebrae in the middle of the tail have the unusual characteristic of having the neural arch divided into two sections at the front and back of the vertebra, a unique and distinguishing characteristic of the genus. There appear to have been no or only unpreserved cartilaginous ribs on the tail vertebrae. The ulna has a olecranon process, and the entepicondyle of the humerus is pronouncedly developed.

== History ==
Protorosaurus was one of the first fossil reptiles to be described, being initially described in Latin in 1710 by Christian Maximilian Spener from a specimen found in Thuringia in Germany, who considered the animal to be a crocodile, and most similar to the Nile crocodile (C. niloticus).

Over a century later, in publications in 1830 and 1832 Hermann von Meyer recognised Protorosaurus as distinct extinct reptile and gave it a formal species description, dedicating an extensive monograph to it in 1856. In 1871 Thomas Henry Huxley erected the clade Protorosauria, with Protorosaurus as the only member. The German specimens were found in the Kupferschiefer a widespread unit of Late Permian (likely Wuchiapingian) age.

In 1914, a new ceratopsian dinosaur found by Lawrence Lambe was again given the name Protorosaurus (in this sense meaning "before Torosaurus"). When Lambe found that the name had already been used for the early archosauromorph, he renamed his ceratopsian Chasmosaurus.

In 1870, a new species, Protorosaurus huxleyi was described from a railway cutting near Middridge in County Durham in northern England, in sediments belonging to the Marl Slate, a unit that is equivalent to the Kupferschiefer, however it was later shown that this specimen was not Protorosaurus, and it was subsequently placed in the new genus Adelosaurus.

In 1993, a specimen of Protorosaurus was described from Quarrington Quarry also in County Durham, in sediments of the Marl Slate. This skeleton included fragments of the skull that had not previously been known. A thorough redescription of Protorosaurus was published in 2009, including a specimen with a complete skull. The complete skull (NMK S 180) was redescribed again in 2025 according to new data from micro-CT scans.

== Paleobiology ==
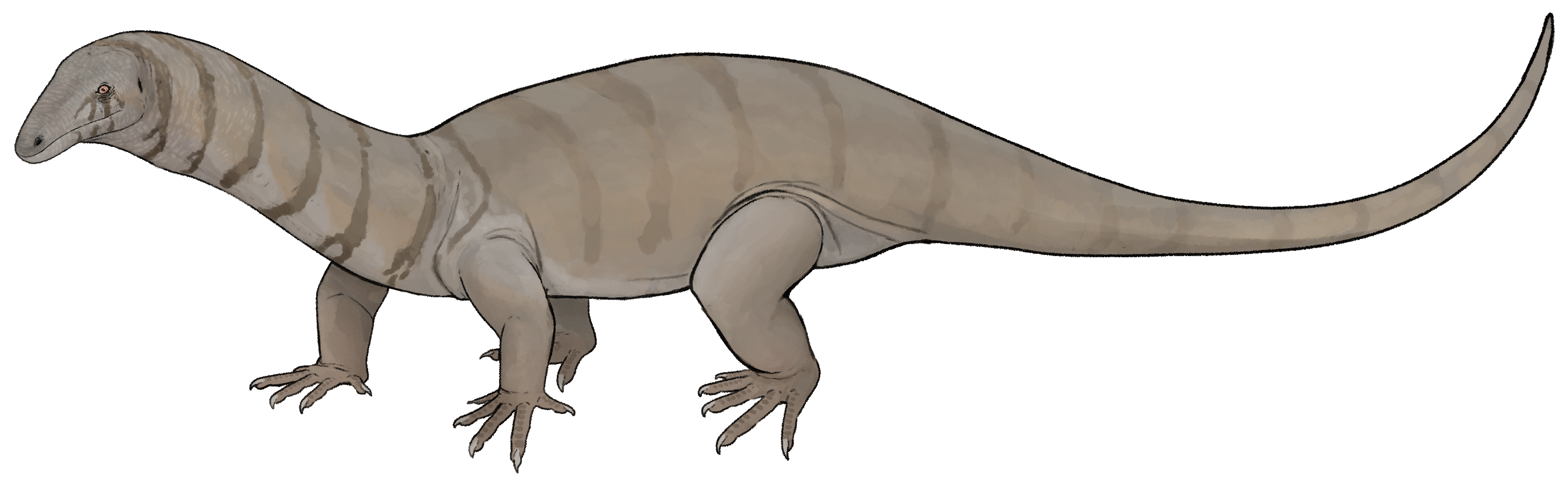
Life restoration

Stomach contents of a specimen of Protorosaurus show the presence of numerous ovules of the locally common voltzialean conifer Ullmannia frumentaria, which was unexpected given its unspecialised dentiton of conical and unserrated teeth, which were assumed to represent a predatory lifestyle. Along with the coniferous ovules, several rounded pebbles were found in the body cavity, these may have functioned as gastroliths.

== Classification ==
Protorosaurus has been suggested to be closely related to Czatkowiella from the Early Triassic of Poland, but the remains of Czatkowiella are fragmentary and mixed in with those of other reptiles, so it is possible that the taxon is a chimaera. In a comprehensive analysis of "Protorosauria" in 2021, Protorosaurus was consistently recovered as the earliest diverging member of Archosauromorpha.

The cladogram below follows an analysis by Ezcurra (2016), and highlights the position of Protorosaurus among other early archosauromorph reptiles.

- Archosauromorpha
  - - †Aenigmastropheus
    - - †Protorosaurus
      - - †Tanystropheidae
        - Crocopoda
          - †Allokotosauria
          - - †Rhynchosauria
            - - †Boreopricea
              - - †Prolacertidae
                - - †Tasmaniosaurus
                  - Archosauriformes

Cladogram after Spiekman et al. in 2024.

- - Archosauromorpha
    - - Protorosaurus
      - Aenigmastropheus
    - - Tanysauria
        - Jesairosaurus
        - - Trachelosauridae
            - - Austronaga
              - Pectodens
            - - Fuyuansaurus
              - - Trachelosaurus
                - - Gracilicollum
                  - Dinocephalosaurus
          - Tanystropheidae
            - Augustaburiania
            - Luxisaurus
            - - - Macrocnemus bassanii
                - - Macrocnemus fuyuanensis
                  - Macrocnemus obristi
              - - UFRGS-PV-492-T
                - - Amotosaurus
                  - - Langobardisaurus
                    - - - Raibliania
                        - Tanystropheus spp.
                      - - Sclerostropheus
                        - - Ozimek
                          - Tanytrachelos
      - Crocopoda

Cladogram after Xavier A Jenkins et al. 2026 .

- Neodiapsida
  - †Saurosternon
  - - †Younginidae
    - - †Tangasauridae
      - - †Claudiosaurus
        - - †Weigeltisauridae
          - †Drepanosauromorpha
          - Sauria Reptilia s. s.
            - Lepidosauromorpha
            - Archosauromorpha
              - †Sauropterygia (including Plesiosauria)
              - - †Protorosaurus
                - Archelosauria
                  - Pantestudines
                  - - †Tanystropheidae
                    - Crocopoda
                      - †Prolacerta
                      - - †Allokotosauria
                        - - †Rhynchosauria
                          - - †Teyujagua
                            - Archosauriformes (including Archosauria)

== Paleoenvironment ==
The Kupferschiefer and equivalent Marl Slate is a marine unit that forms part of the Zechstein, a sequence of rocks formed on the edge of the Zechstein Sea, a large inland shallow sea that existed in Northern Europe during the Late Permian. The environment at the time of deposition is considered to have been semi-arid. The terrestrial flora of the Zechstein is dominated by conifers, with seed ferns also being common, while taeniopterids, ginkgophytes and sphenophytes are rare. Other terrestrial vertebrates found in the Kupfershiefer and lower Zechstein include the gliding weigeltisaurid reptiles Weigeltisaurus and Glaurung, the pareiasaur Parasaurus, the cynodont Procynosuchus, and indeterminate captorhinids, dicynodonts, and dissorophid temnospondyls.
