= Czatkowiella =

Czatkowiella Temporal range: Early Triassic (Olenekian)

Scientific classification
- Kingdom: Animalia
- Phylum: Chordata
- Class: Reptilia
- Order: †Protorosauria
- Family: †Protorosauridae
- Genus: †Czatkowiella; Borsuk−Białynicka & Evans, 2009
- Species: †C. harae

Binomial name
- †Czatkowiella harae Borsuk−Białynicka & Evans, 2009

Extinct genus of reptiles

Czatkowiella is an extinct genus of long-necked archosauromorph known from Early Triassic (Olenekian age) rocks of Czatkowice 1, Poland. It was first named by Magdalena Borsuk−Białynicka and Susan E. Evans in 2009 and the type species is Czatkowiella harae.

== Phylogeny ==
Cladogram after Borsuk−Białynicka & Evans (2009).

- - Lepidosauromorpha
  - - - - - - - Prolacerta
              - - Trilophosaurus
                - Rhynchosauria
                - Archosauriformes
            - Tanystropheus
            - Macrocnemus
          - - Choristodera
            - - Sauropterygia
              - Testudines
        - - Thalattosauria
          - Ichthyosauria
      - Coelurosauravus
    - - Protorosaurus
      - Czatkowiella

Cladogram after Spiekman et al. 2021:

- Diapsida
  - Araeoscelidia
  - Neodiapsida
    - Orovenator
    - - Claudiosaurus
      - - Acerosodontosaurus
        - - Youngina
          - Sauria
            - Lepidosauromorpha
            - Archosauromorpha
              - Jesairosaurus
              - - Protorosaurus
                - - Prolacerta
                  - - - - - Czatkowiella
                          - Sharovipterygidae (Ozimek)
                        - - Fuyuansaurus
                          - Dinocephalosauridae fam. nov.
                            - Protanystropheus
                            - Pectodens
                            - Dinocephalosaurus
                      - Tanystropheidae
                        - - Macrocnemus bassanii
                          - Macrocnemus fuyuanensis
                        - - - Augustaburiania
                            - Amotosaurus
                          - - Langobardisaurus
                            - AMNH FARB 7206
                            - - Sclerostropheus
                              - - Tanystropheus hydroides
                                - GMPKU P 1527 T. cf. hydroides
                                - Tanystropheus longobardicus
                    - Crocopoda
                      - Allokotosauria
                      - - Rhynchosauria
                        - - Teyujagua
                          - Archosauriformes
