= Microcnemus =

Microcnemus Temporal range: Early Triassic, 251–247 Ma

Scientific classification
- Kingdom: Animalia
- Phylum: Chordata
- Class: Reptilia
- Order: †Protorosauria
- Family: †Protorosauridae
- Genus: †Microcnemus von Huene, 1940

Type species
- †Microcnemus efremovi von Huene, 1940

Extinct genus of reptiles

Microcnemus is an extinct genus of lizard-like early archosauromorph reptiles from the Protorosauridae. Members of the genus lived during the Early Triassic period in Russia (Benthosuchus assemblage zone). Once believed to have been an ancestor to lizards, Microcnemus is now known to be one of the oldest members of the lineage that would eventually lead to archosaurs such as crocodilians and dinosaurs. The type species, M. efremovi, was named in 1940 by the German palaeontologist Friedrich von Huene.

The holotype, PIN 2252/387, consists of fifteen dorsal vertebrae, seventeen caudal vertebrae, two humeri, a radius, an ulna, ten femora, eleven tibiae, a fibula, ten unidentifiable bone fragments, a scapula-coracoid, a maxilla and dentary missing anterior end.
