= Rhombopholis =

Rhombopholis Temporal range: Anisian, Middle Triassic

Scientific classification
- Domain: Eukaryota
- Kingdom: Animalia
- Phylum: Chordata
- Class: Reptilia
- Clade: Archosauromorpha
- Genus: †Rhombopholis; Owen, 1866

Type species
- †Rhombopholis scutulata Owen, 1842

Synonyms
- Labyrinthodon scutulata (Owen, 1842)

Extinct genus of reptiles

Rhombopholis is an extinct genus of archosauromorph reptile known from England. The type species of Rhombopholis is Rhombopholis scutulata. Specimens of this genus were collected from the Leamington quarry, near Warwick. This locality belongs to the Bromsgrove Sandstone Formation, which is dated to the Anisian age of the Middle Triassic, approximately 245 million years ago.

== Description ==
Rhombopholis is known from several different specimens. WARMS Gz10, a sandstone block containing vertebrae and limb bones from two different individuals, as well as fish scales and vertebrae, has been designated the lectotype of the genus. Other specimens include WARMS Gz21 (the proximal part of a left femur), WARMS Gz4714 (a left ilium), and CAMSM G.343 (a back vertebra). Rhombopholis lacks distinguishing features, but is believed to be a "prolacertiform" (an outdated term for a basal archosauromorph) due to having low neural spines.

The smaller individual present in WARMS Gz10 is represented by three cervical (neck) vertebrae and a partial femur. Although the vertebrae vary significantly in structure, they resemble those of other archosauromorphs such as Macrocnemus and Malerisaurus. The vertebral centers are broad but constricted in the middle, while the neural spines are long and low. The femur is long and straight, with a bulging front edge at its proximal tip.

The larger individual in WARMS Gz10 is represented by an incomplete caudal (tail) vertebra, a rib, the proximal tip of a right femur, and several metapodials. The rib is straight but expands into two articulations at its proximal end. The femur possesses a longitudinal ridge and is similar to that of Tanystropheus and Malerisaurus. The presumed metatarsal has a ridge on its proximal end, a flat shaft, and a wide distal end with a slight depression. The presumed metacarpal is flat and slightly twisted, with a wider proximal end. The other specimens of Rhombopholis are close to this individual in size.

CAMSM G.324 resembles the lumbar vertebrae of Macrocnemus. WARMS Gz21 has a wide posterior expansion and a thin anterior expansion. By comparisons with Macrocnemus, WARMS Gz21 is estimated to have a total length of 134 millimeters while the femur of WARMS Gz10's larger specimen would be 144 millimeters long. Although larger than Macrocnemus, Rhombopholis would still be smaller than several species of tanystropheid. WARMS Gz4714 has a short anterior process and a broad acetabular region with strongly thickened edges.
