= Austronaga =

Austronaga Temporal range: Middle Triassic (Anisian)

Scientific classification
- Kingdom: Animalia
- Phylum: Chordata
- Class: Reptilia
- Clade: †Tanysauria
- Family: †Trachelosauridae
- Genus: †Austronaga
- Species: †A. minuta

Binomial name
- †Austronaga minuta Wang, Lei & Li, 2023

Extinct genus of archosauromorph reptile

Austronaga (lit. 'southern naga') is an extinct genus of trachelosaurid archosauromorph reptile from the Middle Triassic (Anisian age) Guanling Formation of China. The genus contains a single species, Austronaga minuta, known from a complete skeleton including the skull. This specimen also preserves extensive soft tissue traces, including remains of much of the digestive tract. Austronaga was significantly smaller than the coeval Dinocephalosaurus, and both genera exhibit adaptations indicative of an aquatic ecology.

== Discovery and naming ==
The Austronaga holotype specimen, IVPP V18579, was discovered in sediments of the Guanling Formation (Member II) near Waina Village in Luoping County of Yunnan Province, China. In 2023, Wang, Lei & Li described Austronaga minuta as a new genus and species of dinocephalosaurid archosauromorph based on a partial skeleton, including a nearly complete skull articulated with the first six cervical vertebrae, as well as sixty-five caudal vertebrae. The generic name, Austronaga, combines the Latin word "austral", meaning "southern", in reference to the type locality in the South China Block, with "naga", referencing a water-dwelling snakelike figure in Asian mythology. The specific name, minuta, references the animal's small body size compared to its relatives.

In 2026, Wang and colleagues described the remaining skeleton of the Austronaga holotype that was revealed by further preparation. This includes the base of the neck and tail, in addition to the entirety of the trunk, girdles, and limbs. Extensive soft tissue is preserved within the body cavity, including traces of the stomach, liver, and intestines. This is the oldest record of these body parts preserved in a fossil reptile.

== Classification ==
Wang, Lei & Li (2023) recovered Austronaga as a member of the Dinocephalosauridae, as the sister taxon to Dinocephalosaurus. In their 2026 redescription of Austronaga using an updated version of the phylogenetic matrix, Wang et al. similarly recovered this taxon as the sister to Dinocephalosaurus within the clade Trachelosauridae (previously called Dinocephalosauridae). These results are displayed in the cladogram below:

- †Tanysauria
  - - Pectodens
    - - Trachelosaurus
      - - Austronaga
        - Dinocephalosaurus
  - - Tanystropheidae
