= Nicholas Fraser =

British palaeontologist (born 1956)

Nicholas C. Fraser
- Born: Nicholas Campbell Fraser; 14 January 1956 (age 70); Nottingham, Nottinghamshire, England
- Title: Keeper of Natural Sciences
- Spouse: Christine Mary Fraser (m. 1982)
- Children: Two

Academic background
- Education: University of Aberdeen

Academic work
- Discipline: Palaeontology
- Sub-discipline: Triassic period Vertebrate palaeontology
- Institutions: Virginia Museum of Natural History; National Museums Scotland

Nicholas Campbell Fraser (born 14 January 1956), known as Nicholas C. Fraser, is a British palaeontologist, academic, and museum curator. He specialises in the Triassic period and vertebrate palaeontology. Since 2007, he has been Keeper of Natural Sciences at the National Museums Scotland. He has been adjunct professor of geology at Virginia Tech since 1993 and at North Carolina State University since 2007.

== Early life ==
Fraser was born on 14 January 1956 in Nottingham, Nottinghamshire, England, to Hugh and Patricia Fraser. He studied zoology at the University of Aberdeen, and graduated with a Bachelor of Science (BSc) degree in 1978. He remained at Aberdeen to undertake postgraduate research in geology, and completed his Doctor of Philosophy (PhD) degree in 1984.

== Career ==
Fraser began his career as an academic, and was a research fellow of Girton College, Cambridge between 1985 and 1990. He maintains his link to academia through a number of visiting positions: since 1993, he has been adjunct professor of geology at Virginia Tech; since 2007, he has also been Adjunct Professor of Geology at North Carolina State University.

In 1990, Fraser moved to the United States where he joined the Virginia Museum of Natural History (VMNH). He worked there for the next 18 years. He was Curator of Vertebrate Palaeontology from 1990 to 2007, and also Director of Research and Collections from 2004 to 2007. He remains affiliated with VMNH as a research associate.

In 2007, he returned to the United Kingdom. That year, he joined the National Museums Scotland as Keeper of Natural Sciences, and Head of its Department of Natural Sciences. In addition, he is involved in the TW:eed Project (Tetrapod World: early evolution and diversity), and in investigating the Jurassic vertebrates of the Isle of Skye.

Throughout his career, Fraser has been involved in a number of excavations worldwide including sites in China, Europe, and North America. He has completed 10 seasons of excavation at the Morrison Formation in Wyoming, USA. He helped name Amotosaurus, a tanystropheid protorosaur from the Middle Triassic in Germany; Fuyuansaurus, a protorosaur reptile from the Middle Triassic in China; and Eobalaenoptera.

== Personal life ==
In 1982, Fraser married Christine Mary. Together, they have two daughters.

== Honours ==
In 1985, Fraser was awarded an honorary Master of Arts (MA (Catab)) degree by the University of Cambridge.

== Selected works ==
- Fraser, Nicholas C.; Sues, Hans-Dieter, eds. (1994). In the shadow of the dinosaurs: early Mesozoic tetrapods. Cambridge: Cambridge University Press. ISBN 978-0521452427.
- Fraser, Nicholas; Henderson, Douglas (2006). Dawn of the dinosaurs: life in the Triassic. Bloomington: Indiana University Press. ISBN 978-0253346520.
- Sues, Hans-Dieter; Fraser, Nicholas C. (2010). Triassic life on land: the great transition. New York: Columbia University Press. ISBN 978-0231135221.
- Stephen L. Brusatte; Mark T. Young; Thomas J. Challands; Neil D. L. Clark; Valentin Fischer; Nicholas C. Fraser; Jeff J. Liston; Colin C. J. MacFadyen; Dugald A. Ross; Stig Walsh; Mark Wilkinson (2015). "Ichthyosaurs from the Jurassic of Skye, Scotland". Scottish Journal of Geology. 51 (1): 43–55. doi:10.1144/sjg2014-018. hdl:20.500.11820/3199e6cb-1bf6-4e32-bf5e-acd1d7157532.
- Fraser, Nicholas C.; Sues, Hans-Dieter, eds. (2017). Terrestrial conservation Lagerstätten: windows into the evolution of life on land. Edinburgh: Dunedin Academic Press. ISBN 978-1780460147.
