= Vritramimosaurus =

Vritramimosaurus Temporal range: Early Triassic

Scientific classification
- Kingdom: Animalia
- Phylum: Chordata
- Class: Reptilia
- Clade: Archosauromorpha
- Genus: †Vritramimosaurus; Sennikov, 2005

Species
- †V. dzerzhinskii Sennikov, 2005 (type)

Extinct genus of reptiles

Vritramimosaurus is an extinct genus of large early archosauromorph. Although originally placed in the family Prolacertidae, recent studies on archosauromorph relationships doubt the validity of the family, at least in its broadest sense. Fossils have been found from Early Triassic deposits of the Rassypnaya locality in Orenburg Oblast, Russia. Rassypnaya is located on the Obshchy Syrt, a plateau in the European part of Russia that extends southwest of the Urals toward the Volga River. Vritramimosaurus is similar to the later genus Malutinisuchus, also from Rassypnaya but present in Middle Triassic deposits.
