= Richard J. Butler =

British vertebrate palaeontologist

Richard James Butler is a vertebrate palaeontologist at the University of Birmingham, where he holds the title of professor of palaeobiology. His research focuses on ornithischian dinosaur evolution, dinosaur origins, and fossil tetrapod macroevolution.

== Biography ==
Butler's undergraduate degree is a BSc in geology from the University of Bristol (2002). His Ph.D., in 2007, is from the University of Cambridge.

He then worked at the London Natural History Museum, first as a postdoctoral research assistant (2006–2008), and then a NERC researcher co-investigator (2008–2009). From 2009-2011, he held a Alexander von Humboldt Foundation Research Fellowship at the GeoBio-Center, in Munich, Germany, then Junior Research Group Leader, Emmy Noether Programme (DFG), at the same institution from 2011–2013.

He then came to the University of Birmingham, first as a Birmingham Fellow (2013–2015), then a Senior Birmingham Fellow and Academic Keeper of its Lapworth Museum of Geology (2015–2017). In 2017 he was appointed to a personal chair at Birmingham as Professor of Palaeobiology, adding to this the role of Director of Global Engagement, College of Life and Environmental Sciences, University of Birmingham (2020–2022) and Director of Research & Knowledge Transfer, College of Life & Environmental Sciences, University of Birmingham (2022–to date).

== Professional work ==
According to his web page at Birmingham, his interests are:

- "Systematics, taxonomy, and anatomy of fossil reptiles, particularly dinosaurs and closely related groups
- Terrestrial recovery from the Permo-Triassic mass extinction event
- Phanerozoic and Mesozoic diversification patterns among vertebrates, and fossil record quality
- Late Palaeozoic–Mesozoic vertebrate biogeography
- Body size evolution and its drivers in deep time
- Early evolution of the avian respiratory system, and lung ventilation among fossil archosaurs"

His most cited papers, according to Google Scholar are:

- Butler RJ, Upchurch P, Norman DB. The phylogeny of the ornithischian dinosaurs. Journal of Systematic Palaeontology. 2008 Jan 1;6(1):1-40., cited 237 times
- Brusatte SL, Nesbitt SJ, Irmis RB, Butler RJ, Benton MJ, Norell MA. The origin and early radiation of dinosaurs. Earth-Science Reviews. 2010 Jul 1;101(1-2):68-100, cited 204 times
- Benson RB, Butler RJ, Lindgren J, Smith AS. Mesozoic marine tetrapod diversity: mass extinctions and temporal heterogeneity in geological megabiases affecting vertebrates. Proceedings of the Royal Society B: Biological Sciences. 2009 Nov 18;277(1683):829-34. cited 158 times
- Barrett PM, Butler RJ, Edwards NP, Milner AR. Pterosaur distribution in time and space: an atlas. Zitteliana:An Internal Journal of Paleontology and Geology. (University of Zurich) 2008:61-107. cited 126 times

== Awards ==
He has received The President's Medal from the Palaeontological Association in 2023
