= Fuyuansaurus =

Fuyuansaurus Temporal range: Middle Triassic, Ladinian

Scientific classification
- Kingdom: Animalia
- Phylum: Chordata
- Class: Reptilia
- Family: †Trachelosauridae (?)
- Genus: †Fuyuansaurus; Fraser et al., 2013

Type species
- †Fuyuansaurus acutirostris Fraser et al., 2013

Extinct genus of reptiles

Fuyuansaurus is an extinct genus of "protorosaur" reptiles (probably part of Tanystropheidae) known from the Middle Triassic (Ladinian stage) Zhuganpo Formation of southern China. Fuyuansaurus was first named by Nicholas C. Fraser, Olivier Rieppel and Li Chun in 2013 and the type species is Fuyuansaurus acutirostris.

This genus is known from a single partial skeleton, IVPP V17983. This skeleton includes part of the skull, most of the neck, and portions of the trunk, shoulder girdle, and hip. Fuyuansaurus can be distinguished from other "protorosaurs" by its elongated and slender snout. Like Tanystropheus, it possessed an elongated neck, but it differs from most tanystropheids in the structure of its hip. Nevertheless, Ezcurra and Butler classified it as a tanystropheid in 2018, as did Spiekman et al. in 2021.

== Description ==
The skull was crushed and incomplete, with the tip of the snout broken off and the middle part of the skull obscured by the part of the overlain backbone and hip. Nevertheless, the low angle between the upper edge of preserved snout bones and the lower edge of the skull indicates that the snout was long and slender, more so than its relatives. The maxilla was covered with longitudinal grooves and possibly had a depression on its side, although the overlapping bones makes it difficult to come to specific conclusions about the area. The portion of the skull behind the eyes was rather short, and the parietal bones had a ridge along their midline. The lower jaw was as long and thin as the snout, and the jaw joint had a large and rounded retroarticular process (rear branch). Preserved teeth are all small and needle-like.

The cervical (neck) vertebrae were generally low and very elongated like those of other "protorosaurs". There were likely thirteen cervicals in total, and they were longest at the middle of the neck (specifically, at the seventh cervical). The last few cervicals were shorter and taller than the rest, and it is possible that they were the first few dorsal (back) vertebrae, although no cervical or dorsal ribs were preserved in that region to clarify their condition. Cervical ribs were present on other cervicals, and they were typically very long as in other "protorosaurs". The dorsal vertebrae, though similar in number to the cervicals, were shorter and had taller neural spines. The dorsals immediately behind the shoulder girdle had expanded buttress-like transverse processes (projections which connect to the ribs).

The shoulder region was very incomplete, preserving fan-shaped scapulae (shoulder blades) similar to that of tanystropheids, as well as fragments of a coracoid and humerus. The hip area was somewhat better preserved and more distinctive in Fuyuansaurus. The three bones of the hip (ilium, pubis, and ischium) were separated from each other by short gaps in the skeleton, though the ilium was likely connected to the other bones in life. Unusually, the pubis and ischium were separated by a long, straight gap. This is in contrast to typical tanystropheids, which have the pubis and ischium curve towards each other, often contacting each other at the bottom to enclose a hole termed the thyroid fenestra. A portion of the square-shaped femoral head is also preserved.
