= Cervical rib =

Bones in the neck

Cervical ribs are the ribs of the neck in many tetrapods. In most mammals, including humans, cervical ribs are not normally present as separate structures. They can, however, occur as a pathology. In humans, pathological cervical ribs are usually not of clinical concern, although they can cause a form of thoracic outlet syndrome.

== Development ==
Like other ribs, the cervical ribs form by endochondral ossification.

== Variation ==
Cervical ribs were present in early tetrapods such as Whatcheeria. In Tiktaalik and Ichthyostega, the cervical vertebrae were likely cartilaginous but bore ossified ribs.

Cervical ribs are absent in drepanosaurs.

In squamates, the more anterior cervical vertebrae often lack cervical ribs. In some legless squamates, such as Dibamus and some snakes, cervical ribs are present as far forward as the axis vertebra, but in other squamates ribs do not appear until further back in the neck. In some species of monitor lizard, ribs do not appear until the seventh cervical vertebra.

In crocodilians, all of the cervical vertebrae, including the atlas and axis, bear ribs.

The cervical ribs of sauropod dinosaurs were extended by ossified tendons, and could reach exceptional lengths; a cervical rib of Mamenchisaurus sinocanadorum was 4.2 metres (14 ft) long.

In birds, the cervical ribs are small and completely fused to the vertebrae.

In therian mammals, the cervical ribs fully fuse with the cervical vertebrae to form part of the transverse processes, except in rare pathological cases. In contrast, monotremes retain the plesiomorphic condition of having separate cervical ribs.

== Pathological cervical ribs ==
Cervical rib
- Other names: Neck ribs
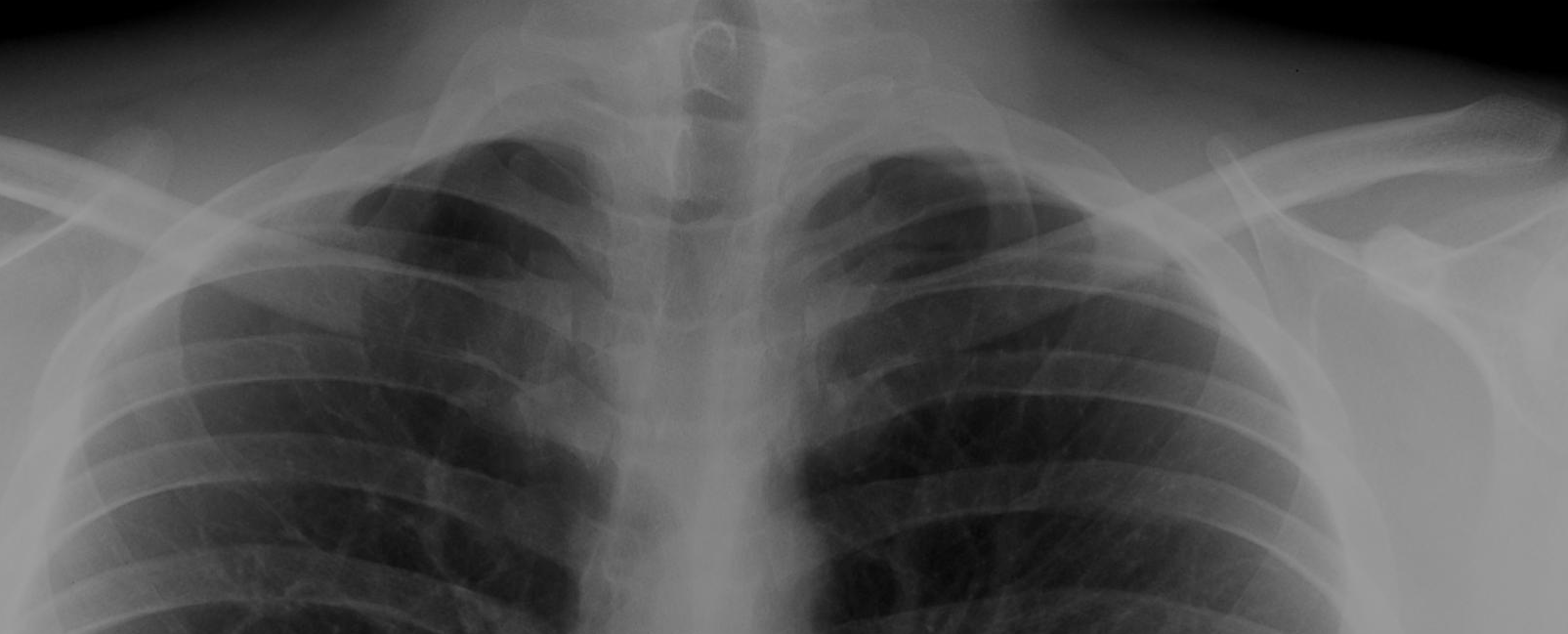
- Specialty: Thoracic surgery

A cervical rib in humans is an extra rib which arises from the seventh cervical vertebra. Their presence is a congenital abnormality located above the normal first rib. A cervical rib is estimated to occur in 0.2% to 0.5% (1 in 200 to 500) of the population. People may have a cervical rib on the right, left or both sides.

Most cases of cervical ribs are not clinically relevant and do not have symptoms; cervical ribs are generally discovered incidentally, most often during x-rays and CT scans. However, they vary widely in size and shape, and in rare cases, they may cause problems such as contributing to thoracic outlet syndrome, because they press on the nerves.

A cervical rib represents a persistent ossification of the C7 lateral costal element. During early development, this ossified costal element typically becomes re-absorbed. Failure of this process results in a variably elongated transverse process or complete rib that can be anteriorly fused with the T1 first rib below.

=== Diagnosis ===
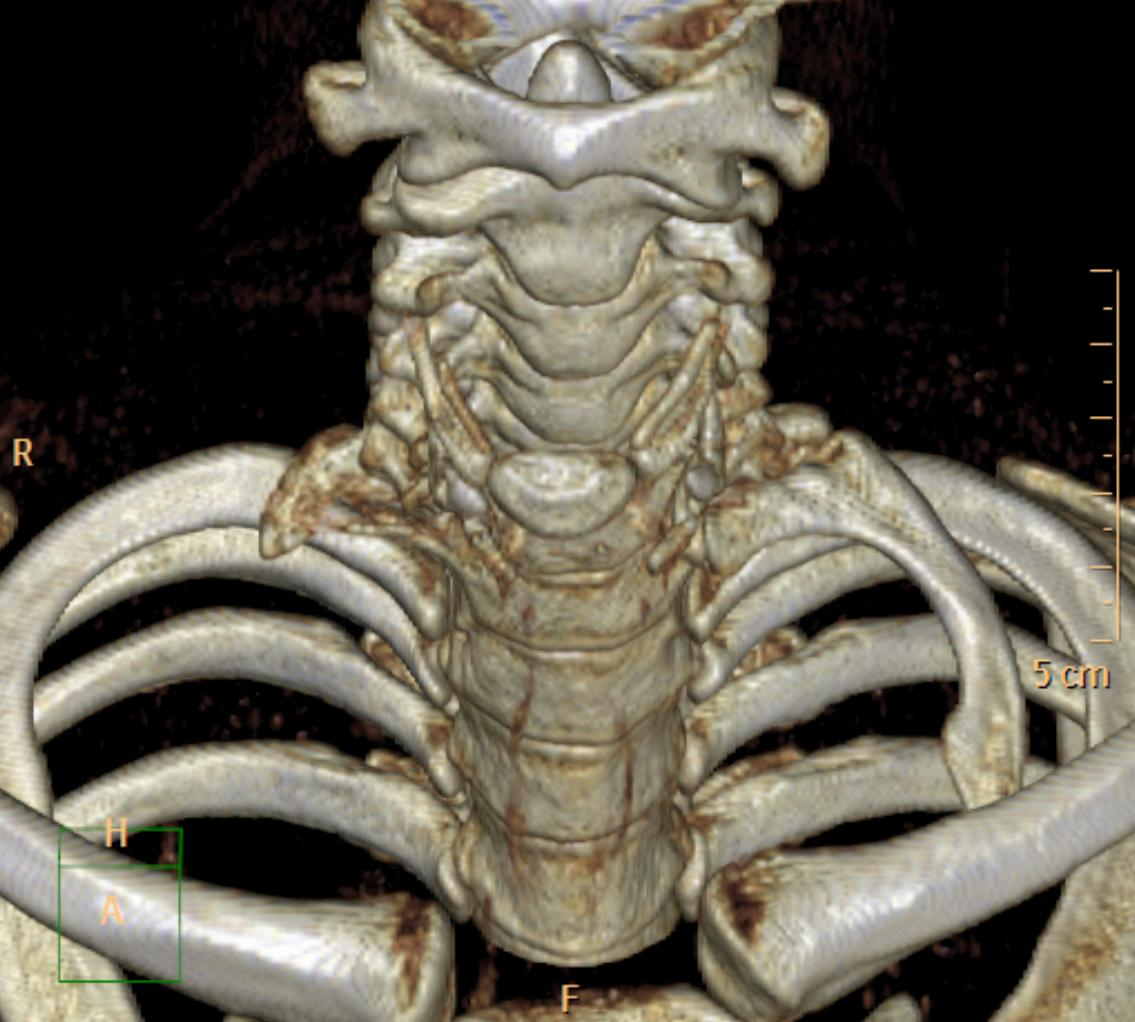
3D CT reconstruction of a cervical rib.

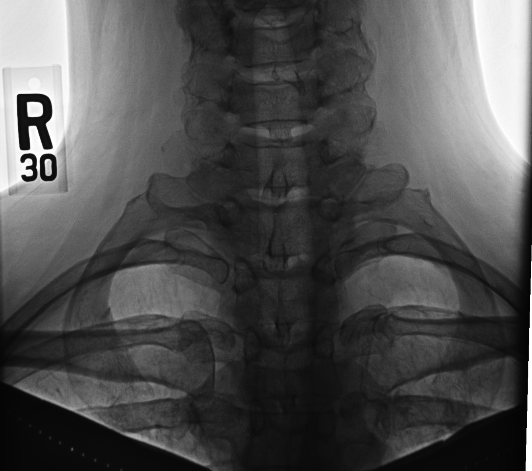
Bilateral, symmetric, full, ossified cervical ribs.

On imaging, cervical ribs can be distinguished because their transverse processes are directed inferolaterally, whereas those of the adjacent thoracic spine are directed anterolaterally.

=== Associated conditions ===
The presence of a cervical rib can cause a form of thoracic outlet syndrome due to compression of the lower trunk of the brachial plexus or subclavian artery. These structures become encroached upon by the cervical rib and scalene muscles.

Compression of the brachial plexus may be identified by weakness of the muscles in the hand, near the base of the thumb. Compression of the subclavian artery is often diagnosed by finding a positive Adson's sign on examination, where the radial pulse in the arm is lost during abduction and external rotation of the shoulder. A positive Adson's sign is non-specific for the presence of a cervical rib however, as many individuals without a cervical rib will have a positive test. Compression of the sympathetic chain may cause Horner's syndrome.

=== In other animals ===
Recent studies have also found a high percent of cervical ribs in woolly mammoths. It is believed that the decline in mammoth numbers may have forced inbreeding within the species which in turn had increased the number of mammoths being born with cervical ribs. Cervical ribs have been connected with leukaemia in human children, so it has given scientists new evidence to believe that the mammoth's extinction was attributed to the condition. They have also been interpreted as a sign of inbreeding depression in other mammals, such as Megaloceros.
