= Madygen Formation =

Geologic formation in Kyrgyzstan

- Stratigraphic range: Carnian; ~235–222 Ma
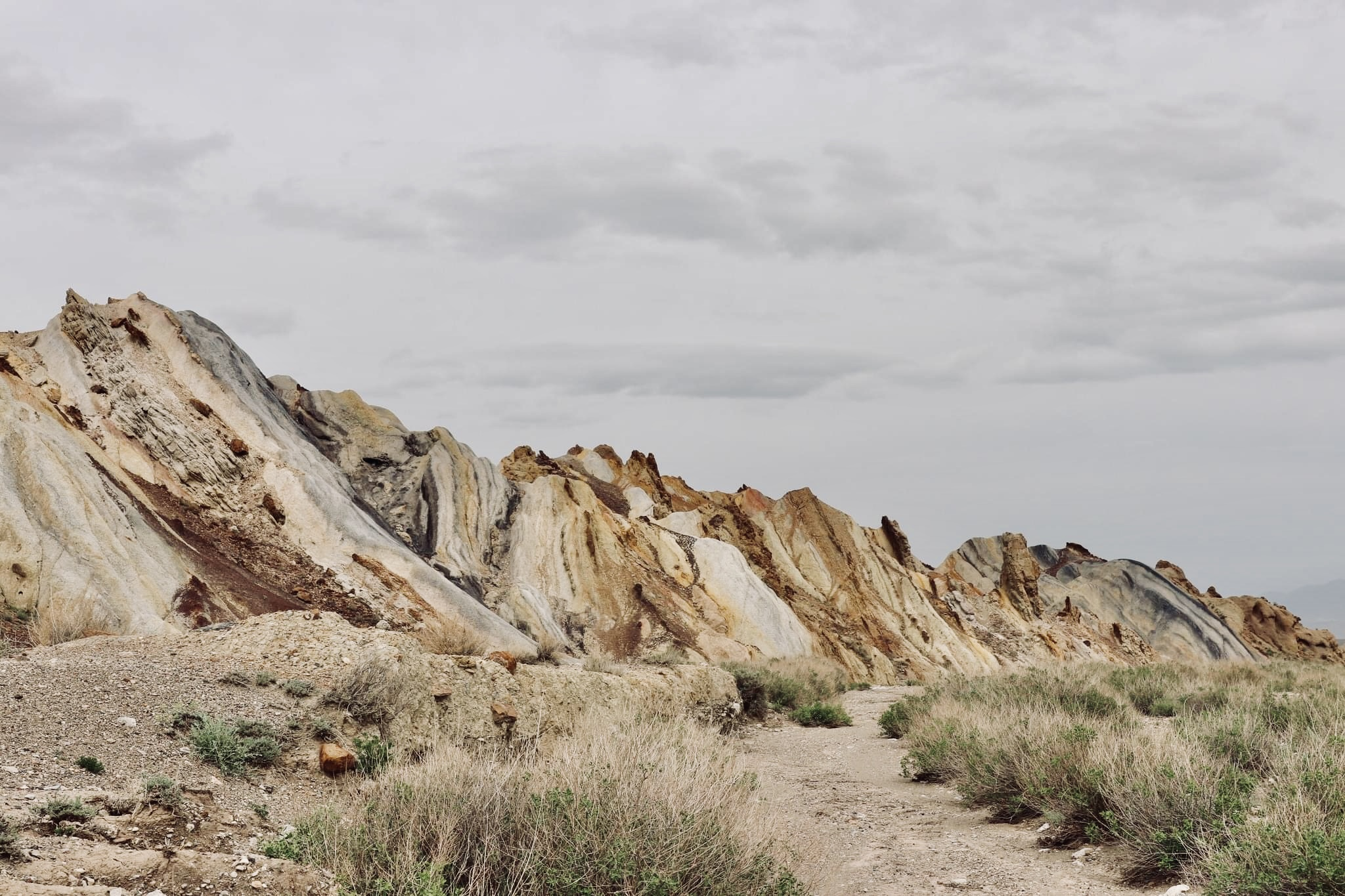
- Type: Geological formation
- Overlies: Cambrian to Carboniferous rocks
- Thickness: 560 m (1,840 ft)

Lithology
- Primary: Conglomerate, sandstone
- Other: Mudstone

Location
- Coordinates: 40.1°N 70.2°E
- Approximate paleocoordinates: 41.2°N 60.6°E
- Region: Batken & Osh Regions
- Country: Kyrgyzstan; Tajikistan; Uzbekistan
- Extent: Fergana Valley & Range

Type section
- Named for: Madygen village
- Named by: Evgeny A. Kochnev
- Madygen Formation (Kyrgyzstan)

The Madygen Formation (Russian: Madygen Svita) is a Middle–Late Triassic (Ladinian–Carnian) geologic formation and lagerstätte in the Batken and Osh Regions of western Kyrgyzstan, with minor outcrops in neighboring Tajikistan and Uzbekistan. The conglomerates, sandstones and mudstones of the 560 m (1,840 ft) thick formation were deposited in terrestrial lacustrine, alluvial, fluvial and deltaic environments.

The formation, extending across the Fergana Valley and Fergana Range, is unique for Central Asia, as it represents one of the few known continental deposits and the Madygen Formation is renowned for the preservation of more than 20,000 fossil insects, making it one of the richest Triassic lagerstätten in the world. Other vertebrate fossils as fish, amphibians, reptiles and synapsids have been recovered from the formation too, as well as minor fossil flora.

The lake sediments of the Lagerstätte provided fossil cartilaginous fishes and their egg capsules and unusual Triassic reptiles like Sharovipteryx and Longisquama. The wide diversity of insect fossils was first discovered in the 1960s and first described by Russian paleontologist Aleksandr Sharov, with a notable example being Gigatitan.

== Description ==
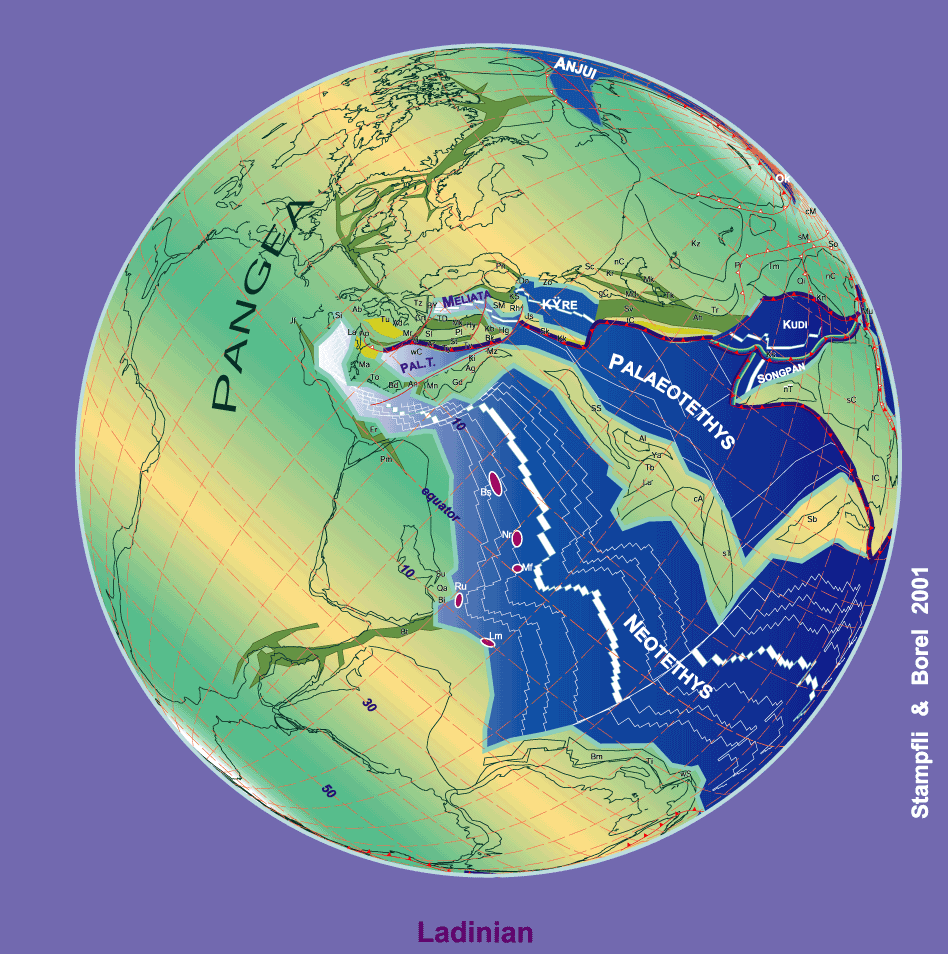
Paleogeography of the Late Triassic, around 230 Ma. The Madygen Formation was deposited north of the Paleo-Tethys ocean.

The Madygen Formation is a 560 metres (1,840 ft) thick succession of predominantly siliciclastic rocks accumulated in a tectonically induced basin, covering parts of the Fergana Range and Fergana Valley of Kyrgyzstan with minor outcrops in Tajikistan and Uzbekistan. The Middle-Late Triassic layers rest on top of Paleozoic basement with local Permo-Triassic molasse sediments. They are likewise overlain by latest-Triassic to Early Jurassic sediments, some of which host their own arthropod faunas.

The formation consists of a wide and multicolored variety of siliciclastic rocks: mudstones, sandstones, conglomerates, fanglomerates, and rare coal layers. This diversity of sediment types reflects the a complex set of depositional environments through time and space, including alluvial fans, sandflats, swamps, back-swamp areas, and littoral to profundal lake zones. The fluvio-lacustrine deposits of the Madygen Formation belong to one of only a few occurrences of continental Triassic beds in Central Asia.

Isotope analyses of fish teeth confirm that the lakes and rivers represented by the formation were entirely freshwater and deep inland, about 600 km from the nearest coast. Though fossils can be found throughout the entire formation, the most extensive fossil deposits occur in the northern area, known as Dzaylyaucho (also spelled Dzhayloucho or Dzhailoucho), which is dominated by brown and grey claystones and mudstones. The abundance of burrows and absence of darker sediments in this area indicate that it was a well-oxygenated lacustrine environment, such as a large oxbow lake.

The environment represented by the Madygen Formation was positioned on the Cimmerian microcontinent, a slab of crust that collided with Laurasia during the Cimmerian orogeny in later Mesozoic times. This orogeny led to the disappearance of the Paleo-Tethys Ocean. The Madygen Formation was emplaced at warm temperate latitudes (34° to 40° north) in a rift basin surrounded by old, eroded mountains, the ancestral Tien Shan Mountains. The climate was likely humid and moist year-round, as drying features such as mudcracks and evaporite deposits are absent.

=== Petroleum geology ===
The formation grades from bottom to top from alluvial to fluvial into a thick succession of lacustrine mudstones, followed by an alluvial package, on top of which lacustrine, fluvial, deltaic and alluvial layers were deposited.

The hydrocarbon potential of samples of the Madygen Formation ranges from poor to excellent. The sediments containing more than 0.5% Total Organic Carbon (TOC) may be regarded as sources of gaseous hydrocarbons rather than of oil. The Hydrogen Index (HI) of outcrop samples reaches 100 and the maximum recorded maturity (Ro) is 0.8.

== Paleontological significance ==
During the 1960s, Russian paleontologists recovered an unusually rich fossil content in the type strata of the Madygen Formation, including abundant macrophytes, more than 20,000 insect remains and unique small reptiles with well preserved soft tissue. Spirorbis-like polychaete worm tubes, crustaceans (ostracods, kazacharthrans, conchostracans, malacostraca), freshwater Bivalves and gastropods are known from shallow to deeper lake environments. Non-aquatic insects are among the most common fossil remains of the Madygen Formation, with half a thousand or so species having been uncovered from these sediments. This makes the Madygen Formation one of the most prolific insect fossil sites In the world. These include representatives of both extinct and extant orders, including the Ephemeroptera, Odonata, Notoptera, Blattodea, Titanoptera, Ensifera, Caelifera, Rhynchota, Auchenorrhyncha, Stenorrhyncha, Coleoptera, Hymenoptera, Trichoptera and Diptera. Traces of insect larvae are preserved in near-shore lake deposits.

Fish remains mostly represent endemic genera assigned to the actinopterygian families Evenkiidae (Oshia), Palaeoniscidae (Ferganiscus, Sixtelia) and Megaperleidus and Alvinia. The actinopterygian Saurichthys and the dipnoan Asiatoceratodus are cosmopolitan taxa also recorded in the Madygen Formation. Two distinctive elasmobranch egg capsule types, i.e. Palaeoxyris, indicating a small Lissodus- or Lonchidion-like hybodont shark and an indeterminate capsule type, imply the presence of two different elasmobranch species which used the freshwater environments of the Madygen Formation as spawning grounds. Tetrapods (and stem-tetrapods) are known from the mostly larval urodelan (Triassurus), a small procynosuchid cynodont (Madysaurus), a chroniosuchid reptiliomorph (Madygenerpeton), an early drepanosaurid reptile (Kyrgyzsaurus), a gliding archosauromorph (Sharovipteryx) and the enigmatic diapsid Longisquama.

== Paleobiota ==
Color key: Taxon / Reclassified taxon / Taxon falsely reported as present / Dubious taxon or junior synonym / Ichnotaxon / Ootaxon / Morphotaxon	Notes; Uncertain or tentative taxa are in small text; ~~crossed out~~ taxa are discredited.

=== Amphibians ===
Genus	Species	Material	Notes	Images
Madygenerpeton	M. pustulatus	Skull and osteoderms.	A chroniosuchid reptiliomorph with aquatic adaptations. It was first named in 2010 on the basis of a nearly complete skull and associated osteoderms. It seems that this tetrapod could've been semi-aquatic, due to the increased flexibility of the trunk region.	
Triassurus	T. sixtelae	plentiful remains, mostly of larval individuals	The earliest known member of the caudata (salamanders and their kin). Most of the known fossils include larval remains (the neural arches of the vertebrae were still paired and no vertebral centers show any degree of ossification).	

=== Reptiles ===
Reptiles are the most abundant of the tetrapod paleofauna at Madygen, with three described genera.

Genus	Species	Material	Notes	Images
Kyrgyzsaurus	K. bukhanchenkoi	A single specimen preserving the front half of a skeleton and scale impressions.	Potentially the oldest known member of the drepanosaurs, a diverse clade of Triassic reptiles that evolved arboreal and fossorial lifestyles. It was also the first member of the group to be described from Asia.	
Longisquama	L. insignis	A specimen preserving the front half of a skeleton and "plumes", and at least five additional "plume" fragments.	A neodiapsid reptile possessing unusual large scaly growths ("plumes") on its back. This animal has gone through a confusing taxonomic history, with some authors suggesting a placement within Archosauromorpha, or as a basal diapsid.	
Sharovipteryx	S. mirabilis	A single skeleton with impressions of gliding membranes, split across a slab and counterslab.	A gliding archosauromorph, and the type genus of the family Sharovipterygidae. Originally named as Podopteryx, a genus name which was preoccupied by a damselfly.	

=== Synapsids ===
Genus	Species	Material	Notes	Images
Madysaurus	M. sharovi	A single partial skeleton.	A small procynosuchid cynodont, and the only synapsid known from the Madygen Formation. The holotype lacked a tail, and was only around 14 centimetres (5.5 in) in length, meaning it was smaller than most of its vertebrate, and even some of its arthropodan contemporaries.	

=== Cartilaginous fishes ===
Possible xenacanth denticles, egg cases, as well as hybodont fossils have also been reported from the formation. The high amount of juvenile individuals found suggest the freshwater systems at the Madygen Formation served as a spawning grounds and nursery's for these prehistoric elasmobranchs.

Genus	Species	Material	Notes	Images
Fayolia	F. sharovi	Egg capsules	An egg capsule likely belonging to a xenacanthid. The egg is elongate and tapers towards both ends, and surrounded by helically twisted collarettes, with one end (the beak) having a tendril.	
Palaeoxyris	P. alterna	Egg capsules	The egg cases of hybodonts that appear frequently throughout the fossil record. They comprise a beak, a body and a pedicle. They display a conspicuous right-handed spiral of collarettes around the body, and in some cases, the pedicle, resulting in a rhomboidal pattern when flattened during fossilisation. The eggs were most likely produced by the contemporary genus Lonchidion, due to the number of preserved juvenile individuals.	
Lonchidion	L. ferganensis	Teeth, denticles, and egg capsules	A hybodontid elasmobranch that lived from the Lower Triassic to the Upper Cretaceous. The fossils found at Madygen (which mainly come from juvenile individuals) suggest this animal spawned within freshwater areas. The majority of the teeth from the Madygen Formation originated from areas full of abundant bivalve fossils, suggesting the young hybodonts frequented these areas due to the rich food supply.	

=== Bony fishes ===
The following fish fossils were found in the formation:

Genus	Species	Material	Notes	Images
Alvinia	A. serrata	Partial skeletons.	A small perleidid.	
Asiatoceratodus	A. sharovi	Partial skeletons.	A medium-sized dipnoan (lungfish), around 30 centimetres (12 in) in length.	
Ferganiscus	F. osteolepis	Nearly complete skeletons.	A small and abundant palaeoniscid, 10–20 centimetres (3.9–7.9 in) in length.	
Megaperleidus	M. lissolepis	Partial skeletons.	A medium-sized perleidid.	
Oshia	O. ferganica	Partial skeletons, scales.	A medium-sized evenkiid scanilepiform with predatory habits. Around 45 centimetres (18 in) in length.	
Saurichthys	S. orientalis	Nearly complete skeleton, scales, other fragmentary material.	A relatively small saurichthyid chondrostean, around 45 centimetres (18 in) in length.	
Sixtelia	S. asiatica	Nearly complete skeletons, scales.	A small and common palaeoniscid, 6–12 centimetres (2.4–4.7 in) in length.	

=== Insects ===
The Madygen Formation is renowned for its insect fauna, with an estimated 25,000 specimens, 500 species, 100 families, and 20 orders found in the formation. Under some estimates, it has the most diverse insect assemblage of the entire Permian-Triassic interval. From EDNA (The Fossil Insect Database), Shcherbakov (2008), and the Paleobiology Database, unless cited otherwise:

==== Odonata (damselflies, dragonflies and kin) ====
The Odonata and other Odonatoptera of the Madyen Formation are rare (about 100 specimens), with moderate diversity. They were described most extensively by Pritykina (1981).

- †Paurophlebiidae (8 species): Cladophlebia (C. brevis, C. parvula), Neritophlebia (N. elegans, N. longa, N. vicina), Nonymophlebia (N. venosa), Paurophlebia (P. angusta, P. lepida)
- †Triadophlebiidae (6 species): Triadophlebia (T. distincta, T. honesta, T. madygenica, T. magna, T. minuta, T. modica)
- †Zygophlebiidae (4 species): Cyrtophlebia (C. sinuosa), Mixophlebia (M. mixta), Zygophlebia (Z. ramosa), Zygophlebiella (Z. curta)
- †Kennedyidae (4 species): Kennedya (K. carpenteri, K. ferganensis, K. gracilis, K. madygensis)
- †Voltzialestidae (3 species): Terskeja (T. paula, T. pumilio, T. tenuis)
- †Batkeniidae (2 species): Batkenia (B. pusilla), Paratriassoneura (P. primitiva)
- †Mitophlebiidae (1 species): Mitophlebia (M. enormis)
- †Protomyrmeleontidae (1 species): Ferganagrion (F. kirghiziensis)
- †Triadotypidae (1 species): Reisia (R. sogdiana)
- †Triassolestidae (1 species): Triassolestodes (T. asiaticus)
- †Xamenophlebiidae (1 species): Xamenophlebia (X. ornata)

==== Blattodea (roaches) ====
The Blattodea of the Madygen Formation are extremely abundant (a quarter of all insect fossils collected), and some preserve details of the entire body. Roaches in the families †Caloblattinidae and †Spiloblattinidae are particularly common and diverse, though most species remain undescribed. Some species were given a preliminary description by Vishniakova (1998).

- †Caloblattinidae: Sogdoblatta (S. maxima, S. nana, S. porrecta), Thuringoblatta (T. sogdianensis)
- †Subioblattidae: Subioblatta (S. madygenica)
- Undescribed species of †Blattulidae, †Phyloblattidae, †Poroblattinidae, †Spiloblattinidae, and potentially †Archimylacridae.

==== †Titanoptera ====
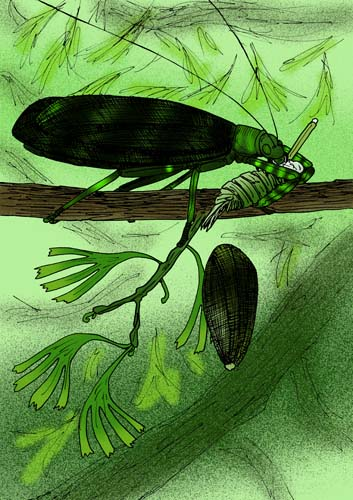
Life restoration of Gigatitan vulgaris

The †Titanoptera of the Madygen Formation are uncommon (about 200 specimens), with moderate diversity, though still higher than any other geological formation. They were described most extensively by Sharov (1968) and Gorochov (2003). One titanopteran of special note is Gigatitan vulgaris, one of the few insects from the formation known from more than wings. This species was a superficially mantis-like diurnal predator with a wingspan of approximately 40 centimetres (16 in). Like other large titanopterans, it was probably a poor flier which primarily used its wings to produce sounds or flashes of light for courtship of defensive purposes.

- †Paratitanidae (11 species): Microtitan (M. zherichini), Paratitan (P. bispeculum, P. intermedius, P. latispeculum, P. libelluloides, P. longispeculum, P. modestus, P. ovalis, P. reductus, P. reliquia, P. venosus)
- †Mesotitanidae / †Gigatitanidae (11 species): Gigatitan (G. ovatus, G. similis, G. vulgaris), Mesotitanodes (M. tillyardi), Nanotitan (N. extentus, N. magnificus), Ootitan (O. curtis), Prototitan (P. primitivus, P. sharovi, P. similis), Ultratitan (U. superior)

Note: Béthoux (2007) considers †Titanoptera to simply be a suborder of orthopterans, rather than its own order. Under this system, the diversity of Madygen titanopterans is also reduced to seven species spread out across two genera (Mesotitan and Gigatitan).

==== Orthoptera (grasshoppers and kin) ====
The Orthoptera of the Madygen Formation are very common (about 1400 specimens) and very diverse (over 100 species). Most species belong to the suborder Ensifera (kin of crickets, katydids, and grigs), with only a few Caelifera (kin of grasshoppers). None of the families survive to the present, and most are endemic to the Triassic. Madygen orthopterans were described most extensively by Sharov (1968) and Gorochov (1986, 1987, 1994, 2005).

- †Haglidae (44 species): Ahagla (A. mira), Archihagla (A. tenuis, A. zeuneri), Cantohagla (C. gracilis), Dinohagla (D. corrugata), Dolichohagla (D. longa), Dulchihagla (D. beybienkoi, D. mistshenkoi), Eumaraga (E. madygenica), Euvoliopus (E. giganteus), Haglomorpha (H. martynovi), Hagloptera (H. intermedia), Lyrohagla (L. decipiens, L. pravdini, L. uvarovi), Macrovoliopus (M. declivis), Maragella (M. reducta), Melovoliopus (M. fasciatus), Microhagla (M. minuta), Modihagla (M. ovalis), Paravoliopus (P. dorsalis), Phonovoliopus (P. musicus), Platyvoliopus (P. maximus), Proisfaroptera (P. martynovi), Protshorkuphlebia (P. kirgizica, P. similis, P. triassica), Sharovohagla (S. plana), Sonohagla (S. chopardi, S. curta, S. saussurei), Stenovoliopus (S. elongatus), Tinnihagla (T. handlirschi, T. zeuneri), Triassaga (T. angusta, T. tshorkuphlebioides), Turkestania (T. deviata), Vocohagla (V. clara, V. tarbinskyi), Voliopellus (V. latus), Voliopus (V. ancestralis), Zamaraga (Z. recticulata), Zavoliopus (Z. densus), Zeunerophlebia (Z. gigas)
- †Proparagryllacrididae (16 species): Batkenella (B. megaptera), Brevibatkenella (B. abscisa), Dolichobatkenella (D. perlonga), Eubatkenella (E. devexia), Gryllacrimima (G. elongata, G. madygenioides, G. perfecta, G. simplicis), Kashgarlimahmutia (K. reducta), Madygenia (M. extremalis, M. longissima, M. orientalis, M. ovalis), Oedischimima (O. deficientis), Parafergania (P. sharovi), Platymadygenia (P. grandis)
- †Xenopteridae (15 species): Axenopterum (A. venosum), Ferganopterodes (F. reductus), Ferganopterus (F. clarus, F. longus), Ferganotriassia (F. lata), Proxenopterum (P. primitivum), Pseudoferganopsis (P. zini), Pteroferganella (P. crassa, P. minuta, P. sharovi), Pteroferganodes (P. decipiens, P. rieki), Triassoferganella (T. angusta), Triassomanteodes (T. madygenicus), Xenoferganella (X. pini)
- †Locustavidae (9 species): Brevilocustavus (B. distinctus, B. microscopicus), Ferganopsis (F. lanceolatus), Locustavus (L. deformatus, L. intermedius, L. madygensis, L. minutus, L. problematicus), Miolocustavus (M. reductus)
- †Bintoniellidae (8 species): Oshiella (O. crassa, O. oblonga), Oshiellana (O. primaria), Paroshiella (P. alia), Probintoniella (P. triassica), Proshiella (P. ramivenosa), Provitimia (P. pectinata), Stenoshiella (S. angusta)
- †Dzhajloutshellidae (5 species): Adzhajloutshella (A. planis, A. talis), Dzhajloutshella (D. arcanum, D. flexuosa), Triassoxya (T. novozhilovi)
- †Tuphellidae (4 species): Neotuphella (N. minor), Tuphella (T. rasnitsyni, T. rohdendorfi, T. sharovi)
- †Gryllavidae (3 species): Gryllavus (G. madygenicus), Paragryllavus (P. curvatus), Zaragryllavus (Z. elongatus)
- †Mesoedischiidae (3 species): Mesoedischia (M. kirgizia, M. madygenica, M. obliqua)
- †Permelcanidae (2 species): Meselcana (M. madygenica, M. permelcanoides)
- †Hagloedischiidae (1 species): Hagloedischia (H. primitiva)

==== Phasmatodea (stick insects and kin) ====
The Phasmatodea of the Madygen Formation are somewhat common (about 350 specimens) and somewhat low in diversity. All of the families were endemic to the Triassic. They were described most extensively by Sharov (1968) and Gorochov (1994).

- †Prochresmodidae (8 species): Prochresmoda (P. longipoda, P. media, P. minuta, P. parva), Triassophasma (T. brevipoda, T. intermedium, T. minutissimum, T. pusillum)
- †Aeroplanidae (2 species): Sharovoplana (S. affinis, S. parallelica)
- †Xiphopteridae? (2 species): Xiphopterum (X. curvatum, X. sharovi)

==== Grylloblattodea (ice-crawlers and kin) and other basal polyneopterans ====
The Grylloblattodea and other basal polyneopterans of the Madygen Formation (sometimes described as Eoblattida or Protorthoptera, among other names) are very common (about 1500 specimens) and diverse (over 50 species). They were described most extensively by Storozhenko (1998).

- †Megakhosaridae (11 species): Madygenocephalus (M. micropteron), Megablattogryllus (M. austerus, M. magister, M. pinguis), Megakhosarodes (M. obtusus, M. paulovenosus), Mesoblattogryllus (M. abruptus, M. intermedius), Metakhosara (M. sharovi), Protoblattogryllus (P. asiaticus, P. variabilis)
- †Mesorthopteridae (11 species): Belmophenopterum (B. rasnitsyni), Austroidelia (A. asiatica), Locustoblattina (L. marginata, L. segmentata), Mesoidelia (M. faceta, M. rasnitsyni, M. semota), Parastenaropodites (P. fluxa, P. longiuscula, P. nervosa), Sharovites (S. alexanderi)
- †Blattogryllidae (9 species): Anoblattogryllus (A. fundatus), Baharellinus (B. dimidiatus, B. pectinatus), Baharellus (B. madygensis), Costatoviblatta (C. aenigmatosa, C. conjuncta, C. longipennis, C. similis), Dorniella (D. primitiva)
- †Gorochoviidae (8 species): Gorochovia (G. anomala, G. bifurca, G. fecunda, G. individua, G. minuta), Gorochoviella (G. conjuncta), Pseudoliomopterites (P. lucidus, P. obscurus)
- †Ideliidae (7 species): Anaidelia (A. extrema), Ideliopsina (I. nana, I. ornata, I. ruginosa, I. stupenda), Madygenidelia (M. conjuncta), Pseudoshurabia (P. pallidula)
- †Geinitziidae (5 species): Geinitziella (G. rasnitsyni), Shurabia (S. anomala, S. ferganensis, S. minutissima, S. tanga)
- †Madygenophlebiidae (4 species): Madygenophlebia (M. bella, M. nana, M. primitiva), Micromadygenophlebia (M. obscura)
- †Sylvabestiidae (2 species): Aiban (A. kichineis), Sharovala (S. triassica)
- †Necrophasmatidae (1 species): Ferganamadygenia (F. plicata)
- †Daldubidae (1 species): Batkentak (B. intactus)
- †Sylvaphlebiidae (1 species): Batkenopterum (B. kirgizicum)

==== †Miomoptera ====
The †Miomoptera of the Madygen Formation are somewhat common (about 500 specimens), most or all of which belong to a single valid species.

- †Permosialidae (1 species): Permosialis (P. triassica)

==== Plecoptera (stoneflies) ====
The Plecoptera of the Madygen Formation are rare (about 80 specimens) and somewhat low in diversity. They were described most extensively by Sinitchenkova (1987).

- †Perlariopseidae (14 species): Cristonemoura (C. binerva, C. porrecta), Dicronemoura (D. acaulis, D. declinata, D. dira), Fritaniopsis (F. brevicaulis, F. dependens, F. remota), Ramonemoura (R. constricta), Triassonemoura (T. ficteramosa), Tritaniella (T. mera, T. pectinata, T. perlonga, T. synneura)
- †Siberioperlidae (1 species): Siberioperla (S. ovalis)

==== Embioptera (webspinners) ====
The Embioptera of the Madygen Formation are rare and very low in diversity. Some Madygen mesorthopterids show similarities to alexarasniids, which may suggest that †Mesorthopteridae is ancestral to the embiopteran lineage.

- †Alexarasniidae: Nestorembesia (N. novojilovi, N. shcherbakovi)
- †Rasnalexiidae: Rasnalexia (R. rasnitsyni)

==== Hemiptera (true bugs) ====
The Hemiptera of the Madygen Formation are extremely abundant (a quarter of all insect fossils collected) and very diverse, though most remain undescribed. By far the most common are small cicadomorphs (kin of treehoppers, leafhoppers, and cicadas), though large butterfly-like cicadas also occur. Fulguroidea (planthoppers) and Stenorrhyncha (aphids, whiteflies, jumping plant lice) are present but uncommon. The only heteropteran in the formation is an extremely rare basal Nepomorpha similar to Ochteroidea (toad bugs and velvety shore bugs).

- †Maguvopseidae: Asiocula (A. lima), Cuanoma (C. protracta), Falcarta (F. bella), Fasolinka (F. beckermigdisovae), Krendelia (K. ansata), Maguviopsis (M. kotchnevi), Nevicia (N. imitans), Nonescyta (N. mala), Phyllotexta (P. latens), Sacvoyagea (S. ventrosa), Sitechka (S. perforata)
- †Palaeontinidae: Papiliontina (P. dracomima, P. machaon, P. spectans)
- †Mesojabloniidae: Fulgobole (F. evansi), Mesojablonia (M. kukalovae), Scytachile (S. emeljanovi)
- †Dunstaniidae: Dunstaniodes (D. elongatus), Siksteliana (S. popovi)
- †Curvicubitidae: Beaconiella (B. cincta, B. pulchra)
- †Creaphididae: Creaphis (C. theodora)
- †Ipsviciidae: Strivicia (S. davidi)
- †Naibiidae: Coccavus (C. supercubitus)
- †Paraknightiidae: Triknightia (T. mira)
- †Progonocimicidae: Pelorisca (P. connectens)
- †Saaloscytinidae: Tingiopsis (T. reticulata)
- †Serpentivenidae: Serpentivena (S.tigrina)
- Undescribed species of †Chiliocyclidae, †Dysmorphoptilidae, †Hylicellidae, †Mesogereonidae, †Pincombeidae, †Protopsyllidiidae, †Scytinopteridae, †Stenoviciidae, †Surijocixiidae, and possibly Ochteroidea.

==== Neuroptera (lacewings and kin) ====
The Neuroptera of the Madygen Formation are uncommon (around 200 specimens) but diverse in form. Only a few species have been formally described.

- †Archeosmylidae: Madygoneura (M. elongata), Osmylotriasia (O. superba), Triasella (T. ovata)
- Berothidae (beaded lacewings): Ferganoberotha (F. miniutissima)
- †Permithonidae: Relictovia (R. pristina)
- Undescribed species of †Osmylopsychopidae, Osmylidae (lance lacewings), and "Polystoechotidae" (giant lacewings).

==== Coleoptera (beetles) ====
The Coleoptera of the Madygen Formation are extremely abundant (a quarter of all insect fossils collected) and diverse (over 70 named species and many more undescribed). By far the most abundant beetles are archostematans, particularly †Schizophoridae and cupedid-grade beetles (†Triadocupedidae, Ommatidae). They were described most extensively by Ponomarkenko (1966, 1969, 1977).

- †Schizophoridae (17 species): Catabrycus (C. hoplites), Hadeocoleus (H. catachtonius, H. gigas, H. pelopius), Lethocoleus (L. sternalis), Pesus (P. prognathus), Praesagus (P. capitatus), Salebroferus (S. asper, S. confragosus), Schizophorinus (S. punctatus), Schizophoroides (S. glaber, S. rugosus, S. tuberculatus), Thnesidius (T. ovatus, T. xyphophorus), Triassocoleus (T. sulcatus, T. tortulosus)
- †Triadocupedidae / †Triadocupedinae (16 species): Asimma (A. rara), Cupesia (C. monilicornia, C. sepulta, C. serricornia), Kirghizocupes (K. cellulosus), Platycupes (P. dolichocerus, P. major, P. pusillus, P. reticulatus, P. sogdianus), Procupes (P. mandibularis), Pterocupes (P. antennatus, P. leptocerus), Triadocupes (T. ellipticus, T. ferghanensis, T. latus)
- Ommatidae / Ommatinae (reticulated beetles, 12 species): Lithocupes (L. gigas, L. incertus, L. punctatus), Notocupes? (N. laticella, N. rostratus, N. tenuis), Notocupoides? (N. capitatus, N. fasciatus, N. triassicus), Rhabdocupes? (R. baculatus, R. longus, R. minor)
- †Ademosynidae (7 species): Ademosyne (A. bacca, A. elliptica, A. kirghizica), Cephalosyne (C. capitata), Dolichosyne (D. confragosa, D. rostrata, D. sulcata)
- †Triaplidae (7 species): Avocatinus (A. elongatus), Catinoides (C. rotundatus), Macrocatinius (M. brachycephalus), Triaplus (T. laticoxa, T. macroplatus), Triassocatinius (T. brachynotus, T. glabratus)
- †Obrieniidae (5 species): Guillermia (G. lecticula), Madygenorhynchus (M. multifidus), Obrienia (O. illaetabilis, O. ingurgata, O. kuscheli)
- †Peltosynidae (4 species): Gnathopeltos (G. dixis), Ofthalmopeltos (O. synkritos), Peltosyne (P. triassica, P. varyvrosa)
- †Asiocoleidae / †Tricoleidae (3 species): Sogdelytron (S. latum), Tricoleodus (T. acutus, T. longus)
- Cupedidae sensu stricto / Cupedinae (reticulated beetles, 2 species): Mesocupoides (M. indistinctus, M. proporeius)
- Trachypachidae (false ground beetles, 1 species): Sogdodromus (S. altus)

==== Hymenoptera (wasps and kin) ====
The Hymenoptera of the Madygen Formation are rare (about 60 specimens), but with moderate diversity. All the species belong to the sawfly family Xyelidae, which still survives to the present. They were described most extensively by Rasnitsyn (1964, 1969).

- Xyelidae (xyelid sawflies, 36 species): Asioxyela (A. parvula, A. paurura, A. smilodon), Chubakka (C. madygensis), Dinoxyela (D. armata), Euryxyela (E. euryptera, E. lata), Ferganoxyela (F. destructa, F. sogdiana), Leioxyela (L. antiqua, L. grandis, L. kirgizica, L. mitis, L. mollis), Lithoxyela (L. fenestralis), Madygella (M. analoga, M. aristovi, M. bashkuevi, M. kurochkini, M. levivenosa), Madygenius (M. extraradius, M. primitivus), Oryctoxyela (O. anomala, O. triassica), Microxyela (M. minuta), Samarkandykia (S. ryzhkovae, S. shmakovi), Triassoxyela (T. foviolata, T. grandipennis, T. orycta, T. sharovi), Xiphoxyela (X. procrusta, X. striata), Xyelinus (X. angustiradius, X. major, X. scherbachov)

==== Mecoptera (scorpionflies) ====
The Mecoptera of the Madygen Formation are very common (about 1600 specimens) and fairly diverse (over 40 species). They were described most extensively by Ponomarenko & Rasnitsyn (1974), and Novokshonov (1997, 2001).

- †Permochoristidae (15 species): Agetopanorpa (A. consueta, A. deceptoria, A. triassica), Liassochorista (L. molesta, L. utilis), Mecolusor (M. confusicus), Mesageta (M. gigantea, M. ignava, M. insana, M. pertrita, M. rieki), Mesochorista (M. injuriosa), Prochoristella (P. ignara, P. longa, P. vicina)
- †Parachoristidae (13 species): Choristopanorpa (C. opinata, C. ridibunda, C. temperata), Kirgizichorista (K. larvata), Panorpaenigma (P. aemulum), Parachorista (P. arguta, P. asiatica, P. comica, P. immota, P. multivena, P. religiosa, P. sana), Triassochorista (T. kirgizica)
- †Thaumatomeropidae (6 species): Blattomerope (B. polyneura), Pronotiothauma (P. neuropteroides), Thaumatomerope (T. madygenica, T. minuta, T. oligoneura, T. sogdiana)
- †Mesopsychidae (5 species): Mesopsyche (M. gentica, M. justa, M. ordinata, M. shcherbakovi, M. tortiva)
- incertae sedis (2 species): †Mecaenigma (M. suspectum, M. viduum)
- †Pseudopolycentropodidae (1 species): Pseudopolycentropus (P. madygenicus)

==== Trichoptera (caddisflies) ====
The Trichoptera of the Madygen Formation are rare (fewer than 60 specimens) and low in diversity.

- †Cladochoristidae: Cladochorista (C. curta), Cladochoristella (C. sola)
- †Prorhyacophilidae: Prorhyacophila (P. batkenica, P. furcata, P. rara,)
- †Necrotauliidae: Paranecrotaulius (P. proximus)
- Philopotamidae? Prophilopotamus (P. asiaticus) (dubious)

==== Diptera (flies) ====
The Diptera of the Madygen Formation are rare and somewhat low in diversity. They were described most extensively by Shcherbakov et al. (1995). Some purported Madygen dipterans wings may belong to four-winged insects instead.

- †Psychotipidae (2 species): Psychotipa (P. depicta, P. predicta)
- †Protorhyphidae (2 species): Vymrhyphus (V. triassicus, V. tuomikoskii)
- †Gnomuscidae? (2 species): Gnomusca (G. molecula, G. renyxa)
- Chaoboridae (phantom midges, 1 species): Triassomyia (T. shcherbakovi)
- †Hennigmatidae? (1 species): Anemeca (A. liya)
- †Kuperwoodidae (1 species): Kuperwoodia (K. benefica)
- Limoniidae (limoniid crane flies, 1 species): Mabelysia (M. charlesi)
- †Nadipteridae (1 species): Nadiptera (N. pulchella)
- †Vladipteridae (1 species): Dilemmala (D. specula)

==== Other insects ====
Psocoptera (book lice) are represented by a single undescribed species from the family †Psocidiidae. Dermaptera (earwigs) are also very rare and undescribed, represented by the family †Protodiplateidae. The extinct order †Glosselytrodea is only slightly more diverse, with rare fossils from the families †Jurinidae and †Polycytellidae. The only fossil Ephemeroptera (mayfly) reported from the formation is a Mesobaetis-like fragment, and its referral to a mayfly has been doubted.

=== Other invertebrates ===
Apart from insects, the most common invertebrates found in the Madygen Formation are Almatium gusevi and Jeanrogerium sornayi, tadpole shrimp-like aquatic crustaceans in the order Kazacharthra. Undescribed ostracod and decapod fossils have also been found, though conchostracans are practically absent. The Madygen Formation is one of the only Triassic sites to preserve statoblasts of freshwater bryozoans (Phylactolaemata). Freshwater bivalves, gastropods, microconchid shells, and worm burrows are also found in the lakebed sediments.

=== Flora ===
The plant fossils of the Madygen Formation were reviewed in detail by Dobruskina (1995). Among the oldest known root nodules have been found in the Madygen Formation, though the exact nature of the plant-microbe interaction responsible remains unknown.

==== Non-vascular plants ====
Genus	Species	Notes	Images
Muscites	M. brickiae	A moss-like bryophyte with long, slender leaves akin to some species of Cryptopodium. Another unnamed species of Muscites is also found in the Madygen Formation.	
Ricciopsis	R. ferganica	A liverwort similar to modern Riccia.	
Thallites	T. sp.	Large leaf-like "thallophytes" (algae or other simply plant-like organisms) of uncertain affinities, some up to 25 centimetres (9.8 in) long.	

==== Ferns, horsetails, and lycopods ====
Ferns are rare and poorly-preserved, though certain horsetails (Neocalamites) and lycopods (Ferganadendron, Mesenteriophyllum, Isoetites) are more common.

Genus	Species	Notes	Images
Chiropteris	C. integalla	Fern fronds	
Cladophlebis	C. ex. gr. nebbensis	Osmundacean fern fronds	
Cladophlebis	C. ex. gr. paralobifolia	Osmundacean fern fronds	
Cladophlebis	C. raciborskii	Osmundacean fern fronds	
Cladophlebis	C. ex. gr. shensiensis	Osmundacean fern fronds	
Ctenopteris	C. punctata	A dubious fern-like plant of uncertain affinities	
Danaeopsis	D. fecunda	Marattiacean fern fronds	
Equisetites	E. sp.	Stems and other fragments of a small sphenophyte (horsetail)	
Ferganadendron	F. sauktangensia	Bark, stem fragments, and tiny attached leaves of a lycopsid. Sometimes described as a tree-like plant with a stem up to 30 centimetres (12 in) in diameter, but most fossils suggest a much smaller maximum diameter of 5.5 centimetres (2.2 in). Previously misidentified as a species of Sigillaria.	
Isoetites	I. madygensis	Quillwort corms (bulb-like stems) with attached leaves, very similar to modern Isoetes. Also probably includes lycopod scales previously named as Annalepis leae. Both Madygen Isoetites species occasionally exhibit rows of deformed scars, likely produced via the egg-laying behavior of damselfly-like insects in the extinct suborder Archizygoptera.	
Isoetites	I. sixteliae	Serrated quillwort leaves, quite common.	
Mesenteriophyllum	M. kotschnevii	Enigmatic strap-like leaves, up to 14 centimetres (5.5 in) long, with a pleated texture and in some cases serrated margins. Most likely from a type of lycopsid. Previously considered to be two species, M. kotschnevii and M. serratum, with the former characterized by large spines (most likely a misinterpretation of insect damage), and the latter characterized by finer serrations. It is notable due to a study from 2006 presenting the possibility that the plumes of Longisquama were potentially plant leaves that had gotten preserved alongside the diapsid (Fraser in 2006). However, Buchwitz & Voigt (2012) rebuked this claim, stating that the plumes do not resemble the shape of this plant's leaves, and that they are not preserved in carbon films.	
Neocalamites	N. hoerensis	Leafy stems and other fragments of a large and very common sphenophyte.	
Neocalamostachys	N. sharovii	Strobili of a large sphenophyte, presumably Neocalamites.	
"Pecopteris"	"P." filatovae	Marattiacean fern fronds	
Pleuromeiopsis	P. kryshtofovichii	Stems or branches of a lycopsid, up to 6 centimetres (2.4 in) in diameter. Nearly all fossils assigned to this species actually belong to other plants, but the holotype indicates that it is a legitimate and unique species similar to Ferganodendron but with larger leaf scars.	
Prynadaia	P. madygenica	A sphenophyte	

==== Pteridosperms ("seed ferns") ====
Pteridosperms are abundant and diverse, making up more than half of all the plant fossils recovered from the formation.

Genus	Species	Notes	Images
Edyndella	E. nikuzae	Leafy peltasperm shoots.	
Lepidopteris	L. ferganensis	Peltasperm fronds	
Lepidopteris	L. parvula	Peltasperm fronds	
Madygenia	M. asiatica	Peltasperm fronds, an endemic species.	
Madygenopteris	M. irregularis	Peltasperm fronds, an endemic species.	
Peltaspermum	P. madygenicum	Fertile shoots and braches of a peltasperm, bearing disc-shaped seed organs.	
Ptilozamites	P. davidovii	Enigmatic leaves of a possible pteridosperm	
Ptilozamites	P. elegans	Enigmatic leaves of a possible pteridosperm	
Sagenopteris	S. vakhrameevii	Caytonialean fronds	
Scytophyllum	S. pinnatum	Peltasperm fronds	
Uralophyllum	U. magnifolium	Peltasperm fronds	
Uralophyllum	U. petiolatum	Peltasperm fronds	
Uralophyllum	U. radczenkoi	Peltasperm fronds	
Uralophyllum	U. ramosum	Peltasperm fronds	
"Thinnfeldia"	"T." rhomboidalis	Frond-like leaves similar to some corystosperm foliage	
Vittaephyllum	V. bifurcatum	Peltasperm fronds	
Vittaephyllum	V. brickianum	Peltasperm fronds	
Vittaephyllum	V. ferganense	Peltasperm fronds	
Vittaephyllum	V. hirsutum	Peltasperm fronds	

==== Other gymnosperms ====
Though subordinate to pteridosperms in terms of abundance, other gymnosperms are still quite diverse, and some of them (Glossophyllum, Podozamites, Taeniopteris) are far from uncommon.

Genus	Species	Notes	Images
Baiera	B. sp.	Ginkgoalean leaves	
Borysthenia	B. sp.	Conifer cones with associated branches and thin leaves.	
Ctenopteris	C. punctata	A dubious fern-like plant	
Cycadocarpidium	C. sp.	Seed-bearing cones of Podozamites-type conifers	
Ginkgoites	G. taeniatus	Ginkgoalean leaves	
Glossophyllum	G. ereminae	Enigmatic fronds of strap-shaped leaves, presumably related to Ginkgoales.	
Leuthardtia	L. sp.	Pollen-bearing cones, potentially from bennettitaleans	
Otozamites	O. sp.	Bennettitalean fronds	
Podozamites	P. distans	Conifer fronds with broad, strap-shaped leaves.	
Pseudoctenis	P. lanei	Cycad fronds	
Pterophyllum	P. hanesianum	Bennettitalean fronds	
Pterophyllum	P. firmifolium	Bennettitalean fronds	
Pterophyllum	P. pachartense	Bennettitalean fronds	
Pterophyllum	P. pinnatifidum	Bennettitalean fronds	
Rhaphidopteris?	R.? brickianae	Fronds of uncertain affinities, potentially among corystosperms, cycads, or ginkgoaleans.	
Sphenobaiera	S. granulifer	Ginkgoalean leaves	
Sphenobaiera	S. aff. zalesskyi	Ginkgoalean leaves	
Swedenborgia	S. cryptomerioides	Seed-bearning conifer cones	
Taeniopteris	T. latecostata	Gymnosperm leaves, possibly from cycads or bennettitaleans	
Taeniopteris	T. multinervia	Gymnosperm leaves, possibly from cycads or bennettitaleans	
Taeniopteris	T. spathulata	Gymnosperm leaves, possibly from cycads or bennettitaleans	
Taeniopteris	T.? stankevichii	Gymnosperm leaves, possibly from cycads or bennettitaleans	
Taeniopteridium	T. glossopteroides	Gymnosperm leaves, possibly from cycads or bennettitaleans	
Voltzia	V. sp.	Branches and needle-like leaves of voltzialean conifers	

=== Insect fauna correlations ===
Progonocimicidae found in the formation are also recorded in the Carnian Los Rastros Formation of Argentina, the Norian Blackstone and Mount Crosby Formations of Australia, and the Norian to Rhaetian Tologoi Formation of Kazakhstan. Permochoristidae are also known from the Carnian Potrerillos and Cacheuta Formations of Argentina, Huangshanjie Formation of China, the Norian Blackstone and Mount Crosby Formations of Australia; the Norian to Rhaetian Tologoi Formation of Kazakhstan, the Sinemurian Dzhil Formation of Kyrgyzstan and the Toarcian Posidonia Shale of Germany.

Orthophlebia had a relatively broad distribution in the Late Triassic as it is also found in the Sinemurian Badaowan Formation of China and Dzhil Formation of Kyrgyzstan, the Pliensbachian Makarova Formation of Russia and Sulyukta Formation of Tajikistan; the Toarcian Whitby Mudstone Formation of England, Posidonia Shale of Germany, and Cheremkhovo Formation of Russia, and the Early Jurassic Kushmurun Formation of Kazakhstan.

Haglidae were also recorded in the Koldzat and Tologoi Formations of Kazakhstan, in the Carnian Cacheutá Formation of Argentina, the Carnian to Norian Molteno Formation of South Africa and Lesotho, and the Norian Mount Crosby Formation of Australia.

== See also ==
- Carnian formations
  - Santa Maria Formation, highly fossiliferous formation in Rio Grande do Sul, Brazil
  - Denmark Hill Insect Bed, insect-bearing unit of Queensland, Australia
  - Candelária Formation, lacustrine formation of the Paraná Basin, Brazil
  - Ischigualasto Formation, alluvial and fluvial Lagerstätte of Argentina
  - Los Rastros Formation, insect-bearing formation underlying the Ischigualasto Formation
  - Doswell Formation, continental fossiliferous formation of the eastern United States
  - Lossiemouth Sandstone, fossiliferous formation of Scotland

Other Central Asian Lagerstätten

- Bissekty Formation, Turonian formation of Uzbekistan
- Bostobe Formation, Santonian to Campanian formation of Kazakhstan
- Karabastau Formation, Late Jurassic formation of Kazakhstan
- Danata Formation, Paleogene formation of Turkmenistan
