= Sharov =

Sharov (masculine, Russian: Шаров) or Sharova (feminine, Russian: Шарова) is a Russian surname. It originates from the Russian slang expression шары выкатить meaning to google, to stare, where шар means eyeball rather than ball. Notable people with the surname include:

- Aleksandr Sharov (footballer) (born 1981), Russian footballer
- Aleksandr Grigorevich Sharov, Russian paleontologist
- Brian Sharoff (1943–2020), American businessman and politician
- Ihor Sharov (born 1961), Ukrainian politician
- Robert Sharoff (1922–1973), American architectural writer
- Sergei Sharov (born 1992), Russian footballer
- Vladimir Sharov (1952-2018), Russian novelist
- Yury Sharov (1939–2021), Soviet Russian fencer
