= Alexander Sharov =

Alexander Sharov may refer to:

- Aleksandr Sharov (footballer) (born 1981), Russian footballer
- Alexander Sharov (ice hockey) (born 1995), Russian ice hockey player
- Aleksandr Grigorevich Sharov, Russian palaeoentomologist and paleontologist
