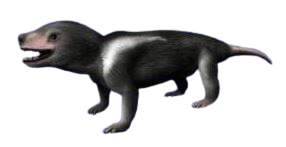

Scientific classification
- Domain: Eukaryota
- Kingdom: Animalia
- Phylum: Chordata
- Clade: Synapsida
- Clade: Therapsida
- Clade: Cynodontia
- Family: †Madysauridae; Tatarinov, 2005
- Genus: †Madysaurus; Tatarinov, 2005
- Species: †M. sharovi

Binomial name
- †Madysaurus sharovi Tatarinov, 2005

= Madysaurus =

Madysaurus Temporal range: 242–221.5 Ma Middle Triassic

Extinct genus of cynodonts

Madysaurus (meaning "Madygen reptile") is an extinct genus of cynodonts which existed in Kyrgyzstan. It was first named by Leonid Petrovich Tatarinov in 2005. Madysaurus is known from the Madygen Formation, a Triassic Lagerstätte that also includes well-preserved remains of insects and small reptiles like Sharovipteryx and Longisquama. Madysaurus is one of the most primitive cynodonts and is placed in its own family, Madysauridae.
