= Notocupoides =

Notocupoides Temporal range: Carnian

Scientific classification
- Kingdom: Animalia
- Phylum: Arthropoda
- Class: Insecta
- Order: Coleoptera
- Suborder: Archostemata
- Family: incertae sedis
- Genus: †Notocupoides; Ponomarenko, 1966

Extinct genus of beetles

Notocupoides is an extinct genus of beetles in the family Ommatidae, known from the Carnian Madygen Formation of Kyrgyzstan, containing the following species:

- Notocupoides capitatus Ponomarenko, 1966
- Notocupoides fasciatus Ponomarenko, 1966
- Notocupoides triassicus Ponomarenko, 1966

Notocupoides may be closely related to the genus Notocupes.
