= Echinocups =

Echinocups Temporal range: Cenomanian

Scientific classification
- Kingdom: Animalia
- Phylum: Arthropoda
- Class: Insecta
- Order: Coleoptera
- Family: Ommatidae
- Genus: †Echinocups; Kirejtshuk and Jarzembowski, 2020

Species
- †Echinocups denticollis (Jiang et al., 2020); †Echinocups neli (Tihelka et al., 2019); †Echinocups ohmkuhnlei (Jarzembowski et al., 2019)

Extinct genus of beetles

Echinocups is an extinct genus of ommatid beetle. It was created in 2020 to house three species originally assigned to Notocupes, E. denticollis, E. neli and E. ohmkuhnlei The genus name refers to the sharp spikes present on the elytra. All three species are known from the Cenomanian aged Burmese amber of Myanmar. The status of Echinocups as a distinct genus was contested by Li et al. (2023), who considered the genus Echinocups to be a junior synonym of the genus Notocupes.
