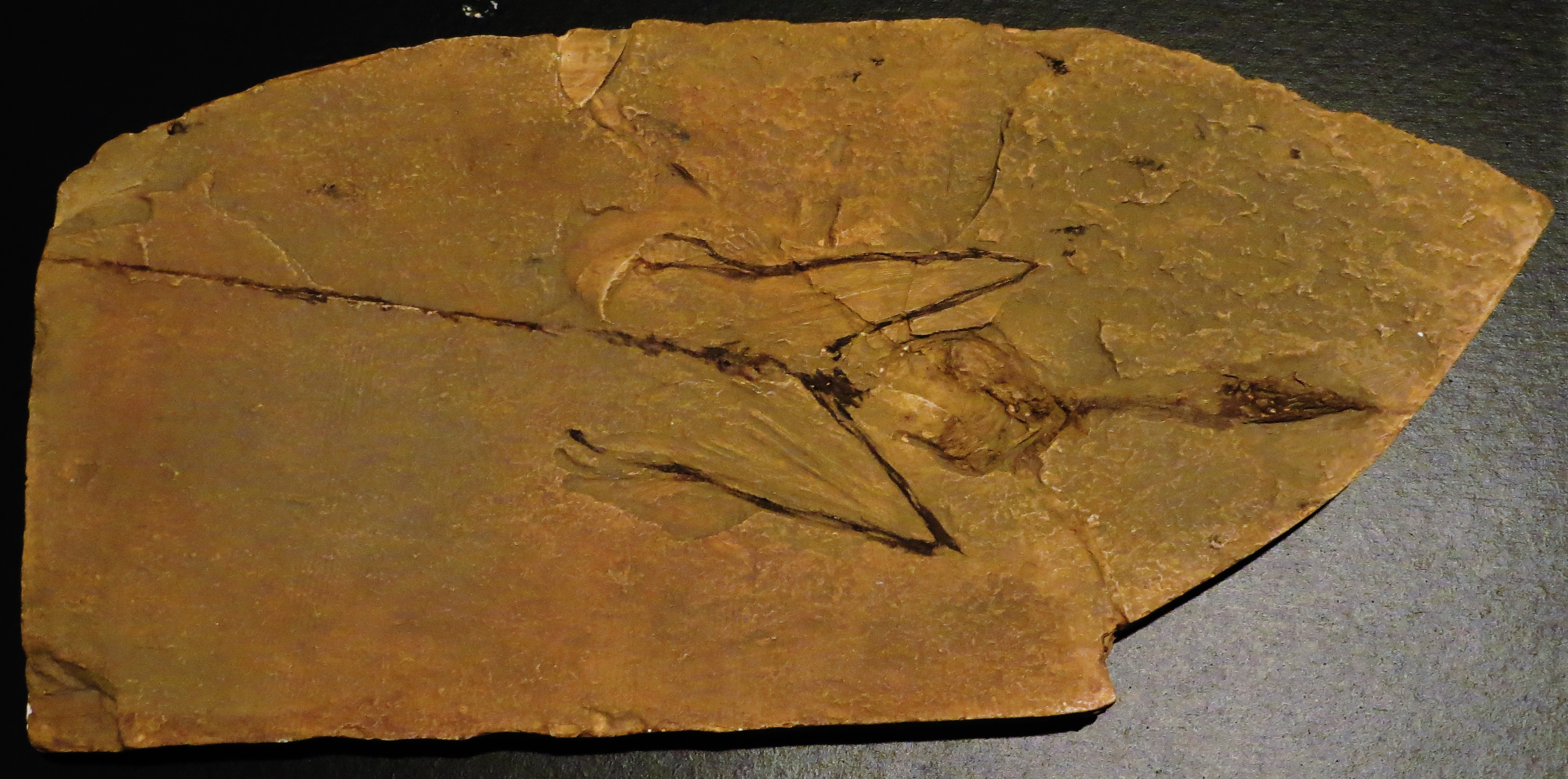
- Type specimen of Sharovipteryx

Scientific classification
- Domain: Eukaryota
- Kingdom: Animalia
- Phylum: Chordata
- Class: Reptilia
- Clade: Archosauromorpha
- Family: †Sharovipterygidae; Tatarinov, 1989

Type species
- †Podopteryx mirabilis Sharov, 1971

Genera
- †Sharovipteryx (Sharov, 1971); †Ozimek Dzik & Sulej, 2016

= Sharovipterygidae =

Sharovipterygidae Temporal range: Middle Triassic-Late Triassic, 230–225 Ma

Extinct family of reptiles

Sharovipterygidae is a family of strange gliding archosauromorphs from the mid-Triassic of Eurasia, notable for their short forelimbs and long, wing-like hindlimbs, which supported membranes for gliding. They are represented by Sharovipteryx and Ozimek volans.

A 2019 phylogenetic analysis suggested that Ozimek, and by extension Sharovipteryx, may belong to the Tanystropheidae.
