= Rhabdocupes =

Rhabdocupes Temporal range: Carnian

Scientific classification
- Kingdom: Animalia
- Phylum: Arthropoda
- Class: Insecta
- Order: Coleoptera
- Suborder: Archostemata
- Family: incertae sedis
- Genus: †Rhabdocupes; Ponomarenko, 1966

Extinct genus of beetles

Rhabdocupes is an extinct genus of beetles in the family Ommatidae, known from the Late Triassic Madygen Formation of Kyrgyzstan, containing the following species:

- Rhabdocupes baculatus Ponomarenko, 1969
- Rhabdocupes longus Ponomarenko, 1966
- Rhabdocupes minor Ponomarenko, 1966

Rhabdocupes may be closely related to the genus Notocupes.
