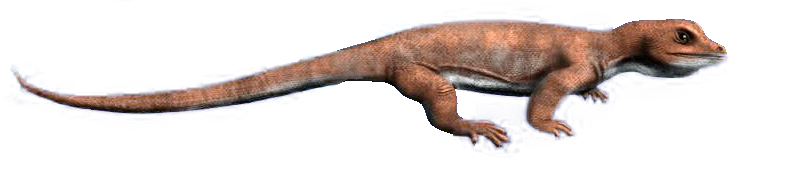
- Restoration

Scientific classification
- Kingdom: Animalia
- Phylum: Chordata
- Class: Reptilia
- Clade: †Drepanosauromorpha
- Family: †Drepanosauridae
- Genus: †Kyrgyzsaurus; Alifanov & Kurochkin, 2011
- Species: †K. bukhanchenkoi

Binomial name
- †Kyrgyzsaurus bukhanchenkoi Alifanov & Kurochkin, 2011

= Kyrgyzsaurus =

Kyrgyzsaurus Temporal range: Middle-Upper Triassic, 230–225 Ma

Extinct genus of reptiles

Kyrgyzsaurus (meaning "lizard from Kyrgyzstan") is an extinct genus of drepanosaurid reptile known from the Triassic of southwestern Kyrgyzstan. It was discovered in the Madygen Formation.

== Discovery ==
Kyrgyzsaurus is known only from the holotype specimen, which includes the anterior part of the skeleton including the skull, cervical and anterior dorsal vertebrae, ribs, pectoral girdle and skin imprints. The holotype was collected from the Madygen Formation, dating to the late Carnian or early Ladinian stage of the late Middle or early Late Triassic period, about 230-225 million years ago. Thus, it represents the oldest known drepanosaurid. Kyrgyzsaurus was also the first Asian drepanosaurid genus to be named.

== Etymology ==
Kyrgyzsaurus was first named by V. R. Alifanov and E. N. Kurochkin in 2011, with the type species Kyrgyzsaurus bukhanchenkoi. The generic name is derived from the name of Kyrgyzstan, and from Greek sauros, "lizard"; thus, the name means "Kyrgyzstan's lizard." The specific name honors Bukhanchenko for finding the holotype.
