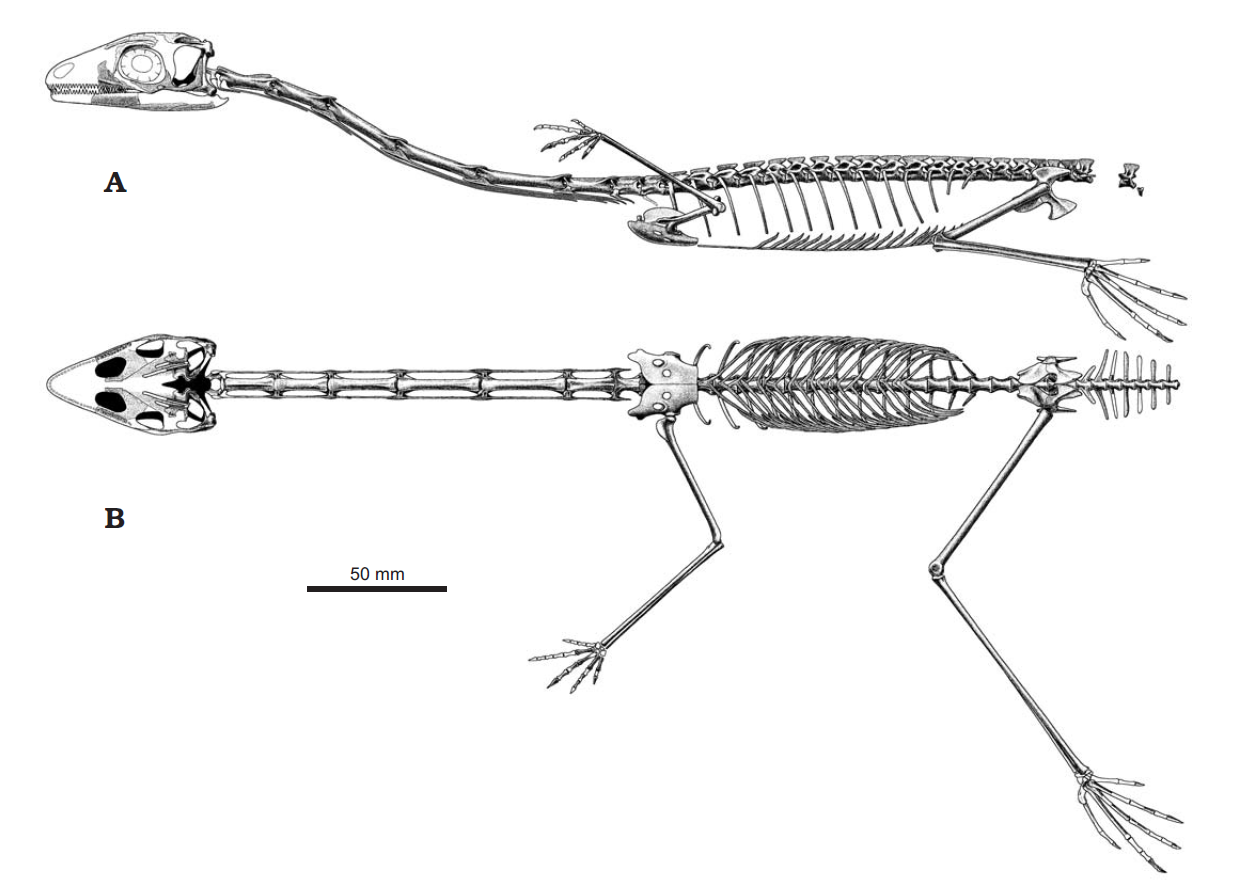
- Skeletal diagram

Scientific classification
- Kingdom: Animalia
- Phylum: Chordata
- Class: Reptilia
- Family: †Sharovipterygidae
- Genus: †Ozimek; Dzik & Sulej, 2016
- Species: †O. volans

Binomial name
- †Ozimek volans Dzik & Sulej, 2016

= Ozimek volans =

Ozimek Temporal range: Carnian, 230 Ma

Extinct species of reptile

Ozimek (named after the Polish town of the same name) is a genus of archosauromorph reptile, known from Late Triassic deposits in Poland, likely closely related to Sharovipteryx from Kyrgyzstan. It contains one species, O. volans, named in 2016 by Jerzy Dzik and Tomasz Sulej. Like Sharovipteryx, Ozimek had long, slender limbs with the hindlimbs longer than the forelimbs; the hindlimbs and probably the forelimbs likely supported gliding membranes as fossilized in Sharovipteryx. Another unusual characteristic was the shoulder girdle, where the massive coracoids formed a shield-like structure covering the bottom of the shoulder region that would have limited mobility. In other respects, such as its long neck, it was a typical member of the non-natural grouping Protorosauria. Initially classified in the family Sharovipterygidae, phylogenetic analysis has indicated that it, possibly along with Sharovipteryx, may have been an unusual member of the protorosaur group Tanystropheidae, although further study of its anatomy is needed to resolve its precise relationships.

Five articulated skeletons and 30 fragmentary specimens constitute the known fossil material of Ozimek, which comes from the Krasiejów clay pit near Opole. Its remains were found uniformly distributed within a rock layer containing fossils of terrestrial animals. During the Late Triassic, the Krasiejów region would have been a lake surrounded by coniferous forests, where Ozimek would have glided between trees feeding on insects such as cupedid beetles. However, individuals of Ozimek still fell into the lake on occasion, where they were possibly subjected to scavenging by amphibians such as Cyclotosaurus and reptiles such as Parasuchus before burial.

== Discovery and naming ==
Starting in 1974, the Krasiejów clay pit near Opole, Poland was excavated by the cement plant Strzelce Opolskie, with the excavated clay being mixed with water for cement production. In the 1980s, amateur fossil collectors discovered bone fragments in the outcrops exposed by these excavations and brought them to the attention of Magdalena Borsuk-Białynicka at the Institute of Paleobiology of the Polish Academy of Sciences (ZPAL). The locality was not found until 1993, when Jerzy Dzik discovered a skull of Paleorhinus. More extensive excavations took place from 2000 to 2002, which were sponsored by the Górażdże cement plant that owned the pit by this point. The clay made the fossils easy to extract, but they were also fragile and needed to be protected by a plaster jacket (for large fossils) or cyanoacrylate glue (for small fossils). Two bone-bearing rock layers exist at Krasiejów: one mainly preserving lake-dwelling animals, and the other mainly preserving terrestrial animals. Based on comparisons of its fauna with sites in Germany (including the presence of Paleorhinus), these layers likely date to the Late Carnian age of the Triassic, approximately 230 million years ago, as part of the Grabowa Formation.

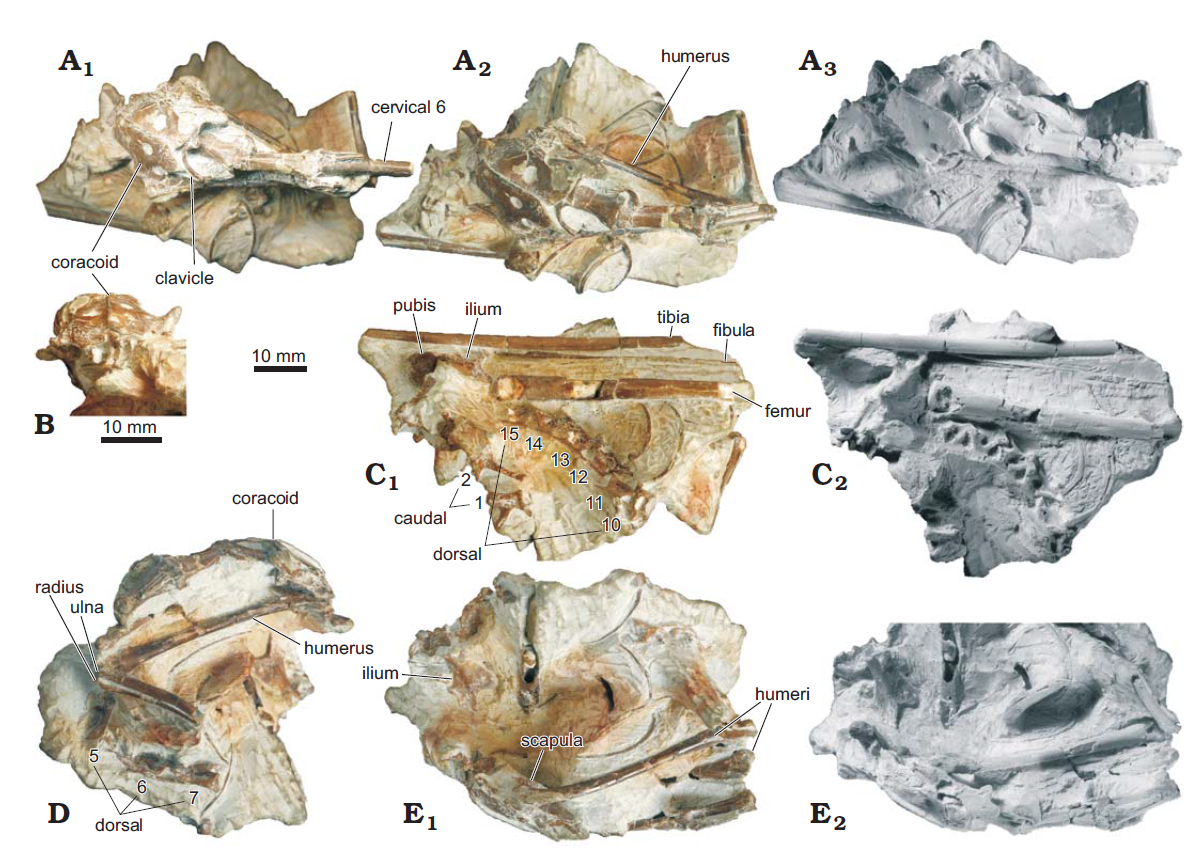
Elements of the holotype specimen ZPAL AbIII/2512

Most of the terrestrial fossils were found towards the north of the clay pit, which was likely the shore of a lake during the Late Carnian. These consist of a number of large tetrapod skeletons, as well as uniformly distributed fossils from smaller reptiles. At some point before 2007, a single, extremely elongated vertebra was discovered among these small reptile fossils; it was compared to the neck vertebrae of Tanystropheus, or the tail vertebrae of pterosaurs. Many additional specimens of this animal were recognized afterwards, with it being the most common among these small reptile fossils. An almost complete, articulated skeleton missing the head was designated as the holotype of a new genus and species, and catalogued as ZPAL AbIII/2512. Other articulated skeletons included ZPAL AbIII/2012, which preserves a crushed head, a nearly complete neck, and partial limbs; ZPAL AbIII/2511, which is the most complete specimen (lacking only the head) but is disarticulated; ZPAL AbIII/3191, which is almost complete with some disarticulated skull bones; and UOPB (University of Opole) 1148, which preserves parts of the neck and limbs. Another 30 fragmentary specimens in the ZPAL collection include neck and back vertebrae, neck ribs, gastralia ("belly ribs"), humeri, femora, tibiae, fibulae, and tarsi (ankle bones).

In 2016, Dzik and Tomasz Sulej named this new genus and species Ozimek volans. The genus name, Ozimek, is derived from Ozimek, the nearby town of the same name. The species name volans (Latin "flying") refers to its possible gliding lifestyle (see §Paleobiology).

== Description ==
Estimated size compared to a human, length of tail and shape of gliding membranes are speculative

Ozimek was a rather small reptile, with an estimated total length of about 90 centimetres (35 in).

=== Skull and vertebrae ===
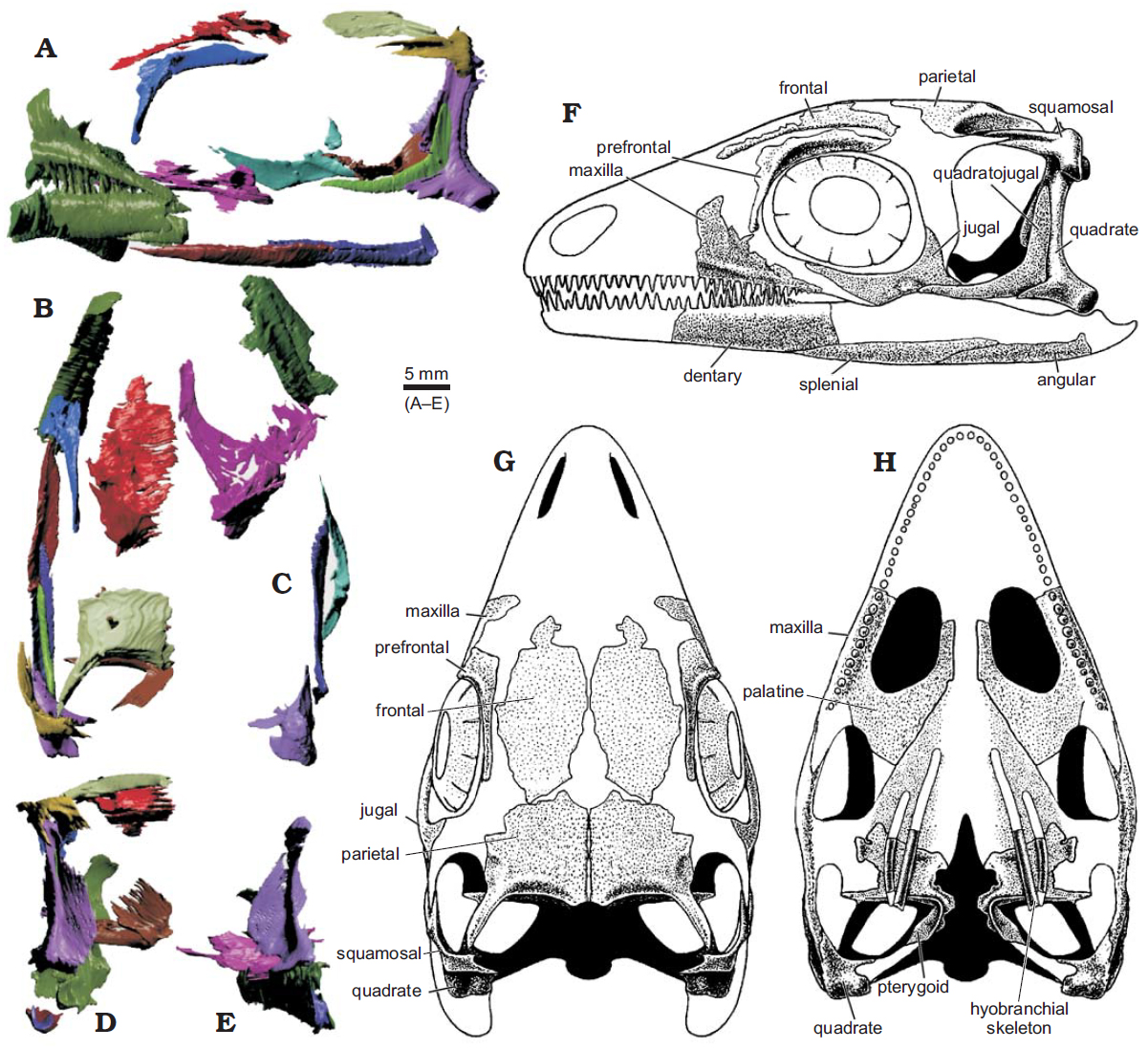
CT scans and drawings of the skull

The skull of Ozimek is only known from fragmentary fossils; from the identifiable fragments, the skull appears to have been diapsid, broad, and compact, unlike the elongated skulls of Protorosaurus and other small archosauromorphs. In particular, like Langobardisaurus, the squamosal bone of the skull roof was large. By contrast, the likewise poorly preserved skull of Sharovipteryx was interpreted as having been narrow and deep by David Unwin and colleagues in 2000, although Dzik and Sulej suggested that its skull was actually similar to Ozimek. The preserved portions of the jaws show numerous small, sharp teeth. Based on the shape and arrangement of teeth in the maxilla, Ozimek may not have had an antorbital fenestra (opening in front of the eye socket). In the eye socket, the scleral ring may have been fossilized. On the side of the skull, the jugal bone would have formed a complete arch.

Like Langobardisaurus and Tanytrachelos but unlike Tanystropheus, Ozimek had vertebrae that were procoelous (i.e., with articulating surfaces that were concave in front and convex behind). Like the latter two, the neural spines were low. It appears that Ozimek had 9 neck vertebrae, 16 back vertebrae, 3 hip vertebrae (in contrast to the 4 to 6 estimated for Sharovipteryx), and at least 7 tail vertebrae. The neck vertebrae were very elongated and thinly walled, with the fourth, fifth, and sixth being the longest; the initially discovered elongated vertebra was one of them. The neck ribs were also long, with some of them extending for the length of three vertebrae. Elongated neck vertebrae and ribs were a common characteristic among protorosaurs. Like other tanystropheids, the neural spine of the axis (second neck vertebra) sloped upwards at the front. For the back vertebrae, the wide neural spines with straight, thickened top margins were similar to Macrocnemus. The gastralia suggest that the underside of the animal was gently convex. In the tail, the transverse processes of the first few vertebrae were very long like Tanytrachelos, which would have given the base of the tail a rhomboidal shape.

=== Limb girdles and limbs ===
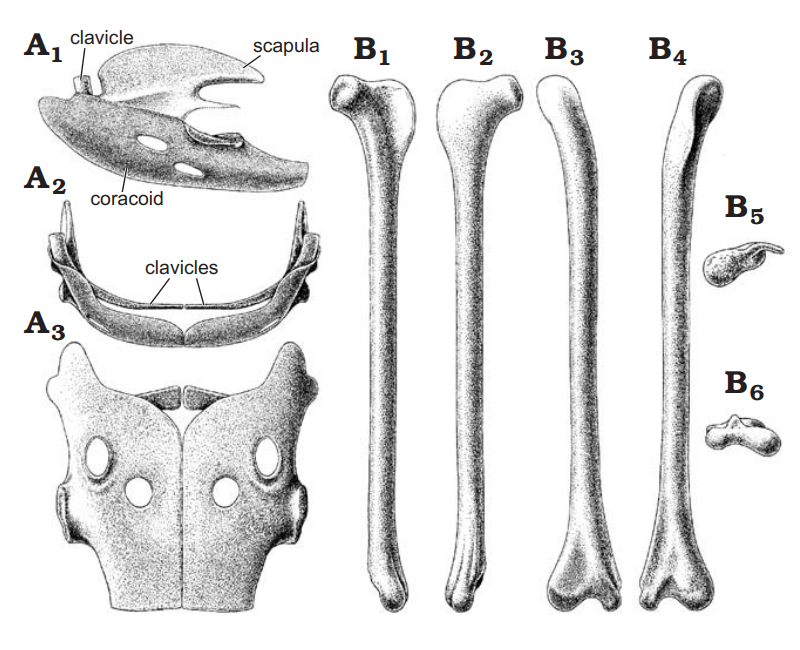
Scapulocoracoid (A) and humerus (B)

An anatomical characteristic that distinguished Ozimek from other protorosaurs was the coracoids in its shoulder girdle, which were large and plate-like, and formed a convex shield covering the bottom of the shoulder region. This structure probably originated by the coracoids fusing with the sterna; Tanytrachelos in particular had large, quadrangular sterna, but they were unfused to the coracoids. Overall, the fused scapulocoracoid complex was the largest bone among fossils attributable to Ozimek. Each coracoid bore two openings in front of each other. The front opening may have been homologous with the coracoid foramina found in other animals, but the origin of the rear opening is unclear. Another distinguishing characteristic is that its scapulae were low (like Tangasaurus) but crescent-shaped (like Tanystropheus and Tanytrachelos). The glenoid fossa where the humerus articulated with the scapulocoracoid seemed to have been limited to the coracoids. The pelvic girdle of Ozimek was more typical of protorosaurs, being similar to Prolacerta, Malerisaurus, and Pamelaria. As in Sharovipteryx, the portion of the ilium in front of the acetabulum (hip socket) was well-developed.

The limbs of Ozimek were exceptionally elongated compared to all other members of the Protorosauria, with the hindlimbs being generally longer than the forelimbs and the femur being 18 times as long as its diameter at its top end. Like Sharovipteryx, the tibia of Ozimek was longer than its trunk; however, Ozimek had proportionally shorter legs relative to its trunk (1.2 times as long, compared to 2.1 times in Sharovipteryx) but thinner femora (14.5 times as long as the top end diameter in Sharovipteryx). The specimens ZPAL AbIII/2511 and ZPAL AbIII/2512 have similarly sized torsos but differ notably in limb proportions; the latter, probably a juvenile specimen, had smaller forelimbs in relation to its hindlimbs along with disproportionately thin humeri but thicker femora. Its feet were also large, with ZPAL AbIII/2511 suggesting that they were twice the size of the hands. Like Azendohsaurus and also other protorosaurs such as Prolacerta, however, the fifth metatarsal in the heel was robust, curved, and hooked, an adaptation related to the stiffening of the foot for more efficient standing and locomotion in diapsids. Like Sharovipteryx, there was a pulley-like projection at the bottom of the femur.

== Classification ==
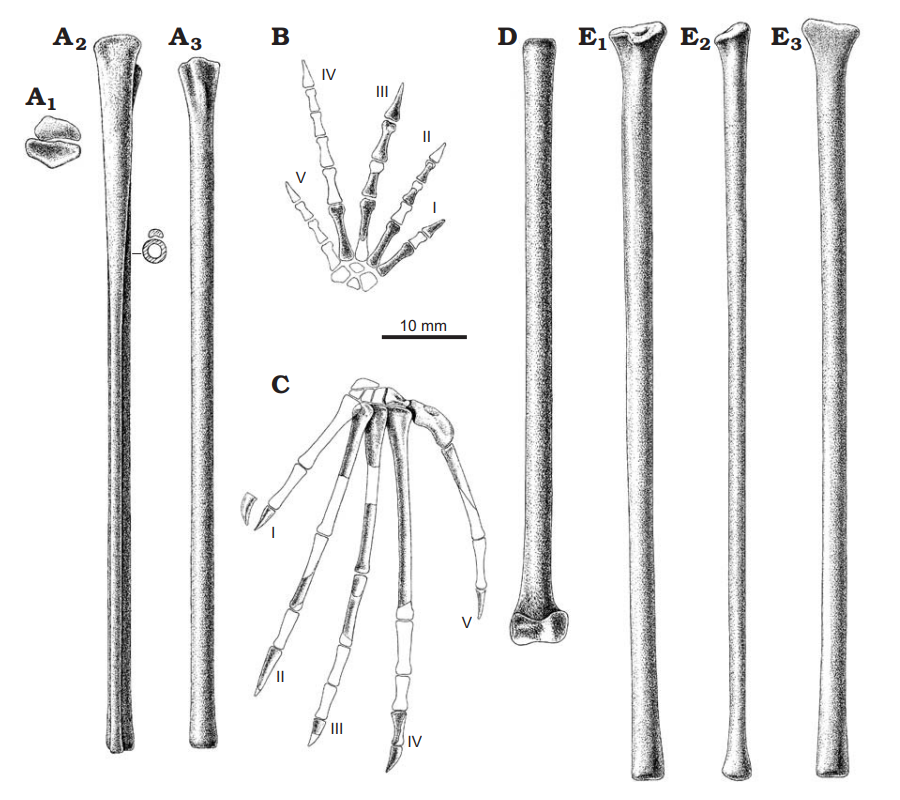
Radius and ulna (A), hand (B), foot (C), femur (D), and tibia (E)

Protorosauria is a diverse group of Permian and Triassic archosauromorph reptiles generally characterized by long necks, especially so in specialized members of the group such as tanystropheids and dinocephalosaurids. Along with its long neck, other features that allowed Dzik and Sulej to refer Ozimek to the Protorosauria included the curvature of its scapulae and the procoelous vertebrae. However, the poor preservation of its skull inhibited them from comparing it to many other protorosaurs. Dzik and Sulej also recognized the many shared features between Ozimek and Sharovipteryx: the elongated hyoid bones, the expansion of the ilium in front of the acetabulum, the femoral projection, and the elongated tibia. These were previously listed as distinguishing characteristics of Sharovipteryx by Unwin; Dzik and Sulej therefore assigned Ozimek to the Sharovipterygidae, which otherwise contained only Sharovipteryx.

The relationship between Sharovipterygidae and Protorosauria is related to uncertainty over the definition of Protorosauria. In 1945, Charles Camp recognized a close relationship between Protorosaurus and Prolacerta; he defined the Protorosauria as being divided into the Prolacertiformes (including Prolacerta), Trachelosauria (i.e., Tanystropheidae), Thalattosauria, and Acrosauria (i.e., Pleurosauridae). By the 1980s, it was recognized that Protorosauria and Prolacertiformes were functionally equivalent groups, with the former taking priority but the latter being preferred due to uncertainty over the position of Protorosaurus. An emerging consensus in the 1980s and 1990s held that Sharovipteryx belonged to the Prolacertiformes, albeit based on characteristics that were either not determinable or widely present among diapsids. In 2000, Unwin and colleagues provided a list of characteristics to better support a prolacertiform attribution: long neck vertebrae and ribs, low neural spines on neck vertebrae, straight femora, tibiae longer than femora, long second phalanges in the fifth digits of the feet, seven or less neck vertebrae, and fourth metatarsals less than three times the length of the fifth. However, in subsequent years, first Prolacerta and then Protorosaurus were increasingly recognized as no longer belonging to the same group as other traditional members by phylogenetic analyses, thus making both Prolacertiformes and Protorosauria non-monophyletic (i.e., composed of groups that were not sister groups). The poor preservation of Sharovipteryx itself prevented its inclusion in these analyses.

In 2019, a phylogenetic analysis by Adam Pritchard and colleagues incorporated Ozimek. They found it as a member of the Tanystropheidae, as the sister group to a clade formed by Langobardisaurus and Tanytrachelos. Pritchard and colleagues suggested that this did not preclude the inclusion of Ozimek in Sharovipterygidae, and that both Ozimek and Sharovipteryx may represent tanystropheids despite representing an ecomorph distinct from traditional members of the group. In 2021, Steven Spiekman and colleagues performed several analyses based on a new dataset. Two variants of the analysis that excluded unstable taxa found Ozimek to be within the Tanystropheidae, as the sister group to a clade formed by Sclerostropheus and Raibliania. Their phylogenetic tree for one of these analyses is shown below; this tree had to be three steps longer, and thus less parsimonious, if they forced Ozimek to not be included in Tanystropheidae.

- Archosauromorpha
  - Protorosaurus
  - - Prolacerta
    - - Jesairosaurus
      - Dinocephalosauridae
      - Tanystropheidae
        - - Macrocnemus bassanii
          - Macrocnemus fuyuanensis
        - - Macrocnemus obristi
          - - Langobardisaurus
            - - Fuyuansaurus
              - - Augustaburiania
                - - Amotosaurus
                  - - Ozimek
                    - - Sclerostropheus
                      - Raibliania
            - - - AMNH FARB 7206 (referred to Tanytrachelos)
                - Tanytrachelos
              - - Tanystropheus hydroides
                - GMPKU P 1527 (referred to T. hydroides)
                - Tanystropheus longobardicus
  - Crocopoda
    - Allokotosauria
    - Rhynchosauria
    - - Teyujagua
      - Archosauriformes

However, in two other variants of the analysis that included the unstable Czatkowiella, it formed a group with Ozimek that lay outside of the Tanystropheidae. The analysis indicated that the two shared one anatomical characteristic: the back vertebrae were between 2.16 and 2.20 times as long as they were tall. Czatkowiella is a problematic species, because it is unclear that the attributed fossil remains actually belong to a single species. Spiekman and colleagues concluded that the position of Ozimek, and by extension Sharovipteryx, remained uncertain and that additional study of its anatomy would be required to elucidate its relationships.

== Paleobiology ==
=== Gliding ===
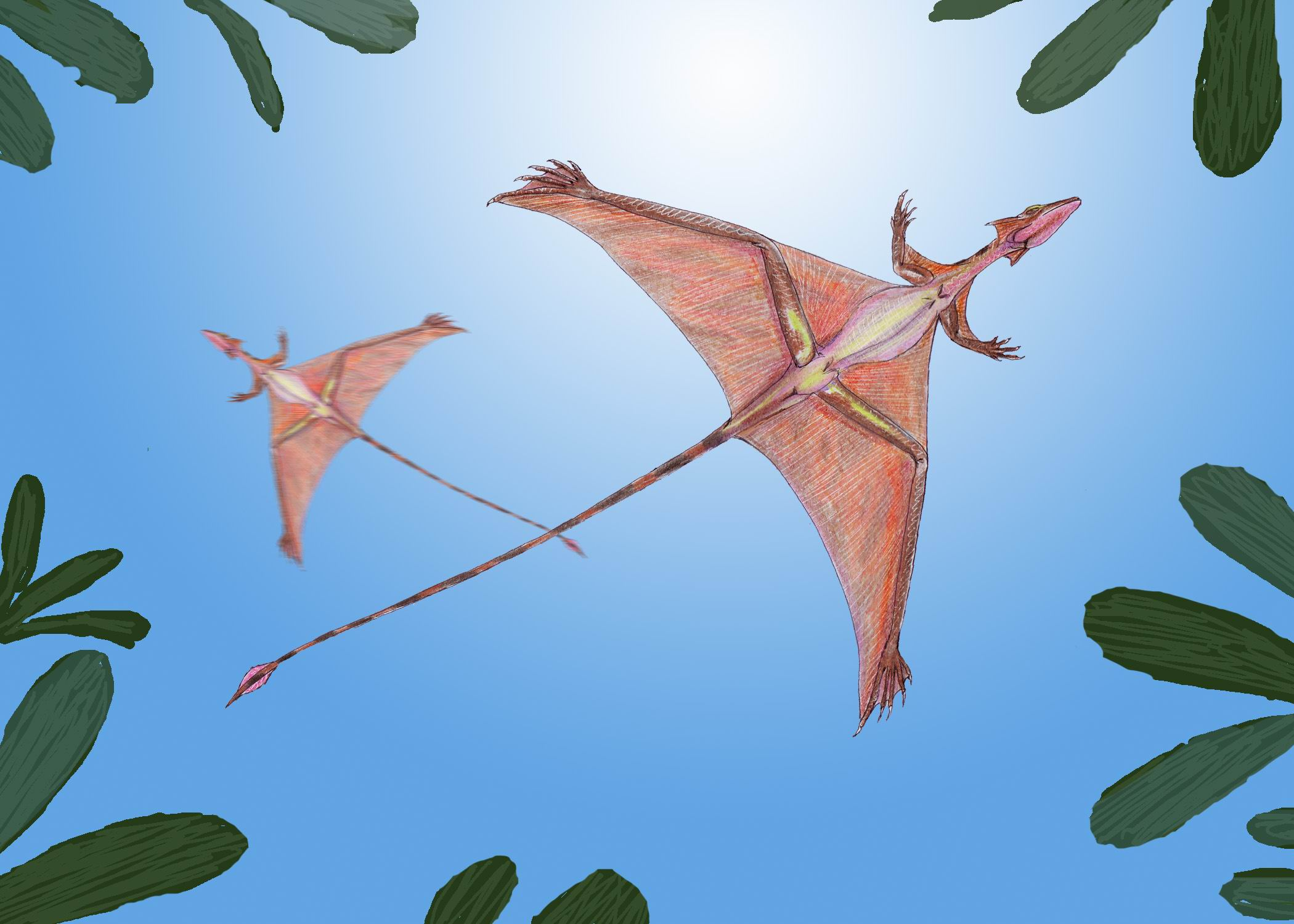
Sharovipteryx gliding following the delta wing configuration of Dyke and colleagues.

Ozimek likely had membranes that reached from the tips of its elongated hindlimbs to the base of its tail, as is preserved in the holotype of the similarly proportioned Sharovipteryx. This membrane may either have been stiff (as is the case in many reptiles) or flexible. In 1987, Carl Gans and colleagues put forth three hypotheses for the function of the membranes: (1) that they were used for camouflage; (2) that they were used as display features for sexual selection; or (3) they were used for gliding, a hypothesis supported by the likely density of the pelvic musculature in Sharovipteryx and also Ozimek. They found that it was plausible for Sharovipteryx to have used the membranes for gliding. The length of the hindlimbs was also inferred to have aided jumping in Sharovipteryx, as is the case in modern lizards such as Otocryptis and Amphibolurus. Altogether, they suggested that Sharovipteryx likely jumped from elevated places, extended its membranes to glide, and then eventually stalled until it landed against a tree. While Gans and colleagues suggested that the hindlimbs of Sharovipteryx extended forwards, leading to an unstable mode of gliding, aerodynamic modelling by Gareth Dyke and colleagues in 2006 suggested instead that the hindlimbs were extended outwards and backwards to support a delta wing that could be controlled by the angle of the knee.

Other anatomical characteristics may have supported gliding in sharovipterygids. The holotype of Sharovipteryx does not preserve forelimbs. Both Gans and colleagues and Dyke and colleagues hypothesized that the forelimbs may have supported an additional pair of membranes, which would have served as a canard wing to improve control and balance the pitching moment of the hindlimb wings. Dzik and Sulej noted that the structure of the scapulocoracoid in Ozimek would prevent flapping flight, and that they were at best used for gliding. They also noted that the vertebral bodies and long bones of Ozimek were hollow, but did not have external openings for air sacs that would allow air to fill them; these spaces may have been filled with fat instead, but either way they would have lightened the skeletal structure of Ozimek.

=== Histology ===
Ozimek volans was the subject of a 2024 histological analysis, focusing on the internal structure of two limb bones of the referred specimen UOPB 1148: a humerus 4.9 cm (1.9 in) in length, and a femur 9.7 cm (3.8 in) long. The femur is the largest known for the species, though the humerus is 46% of the maximum size. The endosteum and periosteum are well-delineated in the cortex, and minor patches of coarse compact cancellous bone (dense spongy-textured bone) can be found along the inner edge of the periosteum. The medullary cavity is large and vascular canals are simple, rare, and entirely longitudinal (lengthwise in orientation) wherever they occur.

The bones are notable for their abundance of strongly defined lamellae (thin regular layers) ringing along the circumference of the cortex. These lamellae are formed from longitudinal fibers, and are only clearly visible in a transverse cross-section. In most tetrapods, lamellae are concentrated in osteons rather than the bone as a whole, so the long bones of Ozimek superficially resemble gigantic osteons. This condition helped to strengthen the bone. Longitudinal fibers in a cylindrical bone add rigidity and resistance to bending in multiple directions, a useful adaptation against the various aerodynamic forces experienced while gliding. Unlike birds or pterosaurs, Ozimek lacks pneumaticity (weight-saving air sacs in bone) in the balance of strength against weight. Extensive lamellar bone serves the same purpose by maximizing strength without adding weight. Bats use a similar strategy in their wing bones, though past a certain size threshold lamellar bone may lose effectiveness relative to pneumaticity.

The femur appears to be from a juvenile: the periosteum is still developing rapidly (according to the higher density of vascular canals), secondary remodeling is minimal, and the endosteum has barely begun development. Three lines of arrested growth are preserved in the femur, indicating the animal was probably at least three years old and likely older. The humerus, on the other hand, has presumably reached its maximum size, and a thickened outer layer on the periosteum shows that its growth has ceased. The femur is already twice as long as the humerus, an extreme and unexpected difference in proportion (in comparison, the mature holotype has a femur which is only 70% longer than its humerus). The simplest explanation for this discrepancy is that the referred femur and humerus do not belong to the same animal as each other. Possible additional factors include sexual dimorphism, multiple species, or developmental plasticity (strongly different growth strategies and maximum sizes between individuals of the same species). On the basis of the results for UOPB 1148, it is also conceivable that the holotype represents multiple individuals rather than a single skeleton.

== Paleoecology ==
The mudstone and siltstone deposits of the Krasiejów clay pit indicate that it was deposited in a lacustrine (lake-based) environment; mudstone and siltstone made up about 45% of the rock, with another 40% being quartz and the rest being calcite. Meandering rivers likely flowed into the lake from the south and southeast, carrying calcite from eroded Muschelkalk (chalk) deposits 15 kilometres (9.3 mi) to the south. This made the water alkaline, which combined with the anoxic conditions at the bottom of the lake (as indicated by dark-coloured rocks) would have preserved the bones while preventing organic matter from being preserved. The conditions of the Ozimek fossils suggests that they fell into the lake while gliding, and then possibly underwent scavenging by lake-dwelling tetrapods before they were finally buried in the mud.

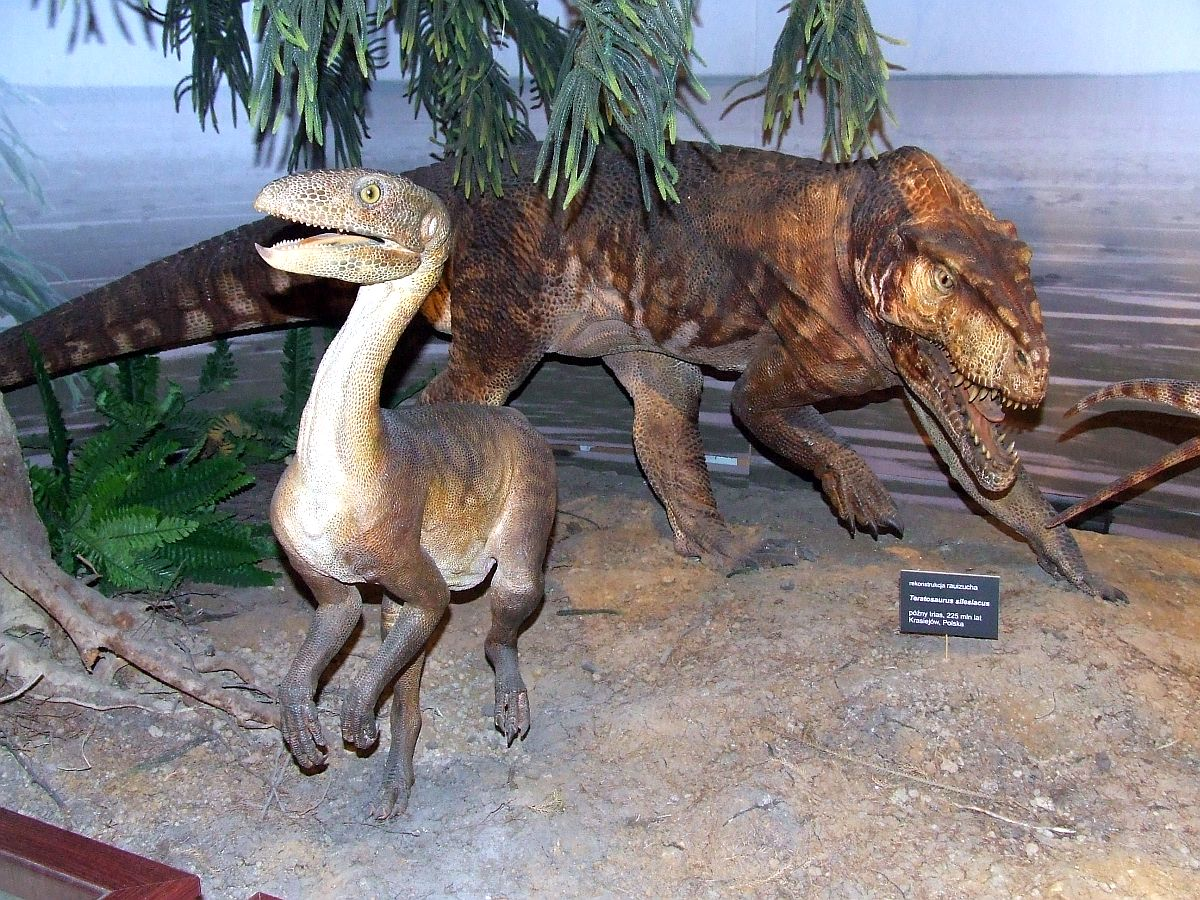
Polonosuchus (background) and Silesaurus (foreground) were land tetrapods contemporary with Ozimek

Conifer seeds and cone scales show that Krasiejów was surrounded by a forest; Dzik and Sulej inferred that the long neck and gliding membrane of Ozimek was an adaptation to hunting insects in the forest. Indeed, elytra (forewings) of cupedids (reticulated beetles) have been found. Two types of conifers were present. One, with cone scales similar to Pseudohirmerella platysperma, was more common and likely had long, pointed leaves. Another, with cone scales similar to "Pachylepis" quinquies, was associated with tape-like leaves. The fern Sphenopteris schoenleiniana was also present, as was the bennettitalean Pterophyllum. These plants indicate that the climate was relatively dry. Calcified remains indicate that the water supported charophyte algae.

On land, large tetrapods included the aetosaur Stagonolepis robertsoni (or S. olenkae), the rauisuchid Polonosuchus silesiacus, and the silesaurid Silesaurus opolensis; other than Ozimek, small tetrapods included a sphenodontid. In the water, the unionid (river mussel) Silesunio parvus was the most common fossil, and was accompanied by other invertebrates such as the conchostracan (clam shrimp) Laxitextella laxitexta, the ostracods (seed shrimp) Darwinula and Suchonella, a crab-like cyclid, and a gastropod. Poorly preserved fish fossils indicate the presence of the ray-finned fish "Dictyopyge" socialis and the lungfish Ptychoceratodus roemeri. These would have been the primary food source of the large temnospondyl Metoposaurus krasiejowensis, the most common aquatic tetrapod, while the larger, semi-aquatic temnospondyl Cyclotosaurus intermedius may have been a crocodile-like predator of land animals. The second-most common aquatic tetrapod was the phytosaur Parasuchus cf. arenacus. Prolonged droughts may have resulted in mass deaths of Metoposaurus and Parasuchus in the disappearing lake.
