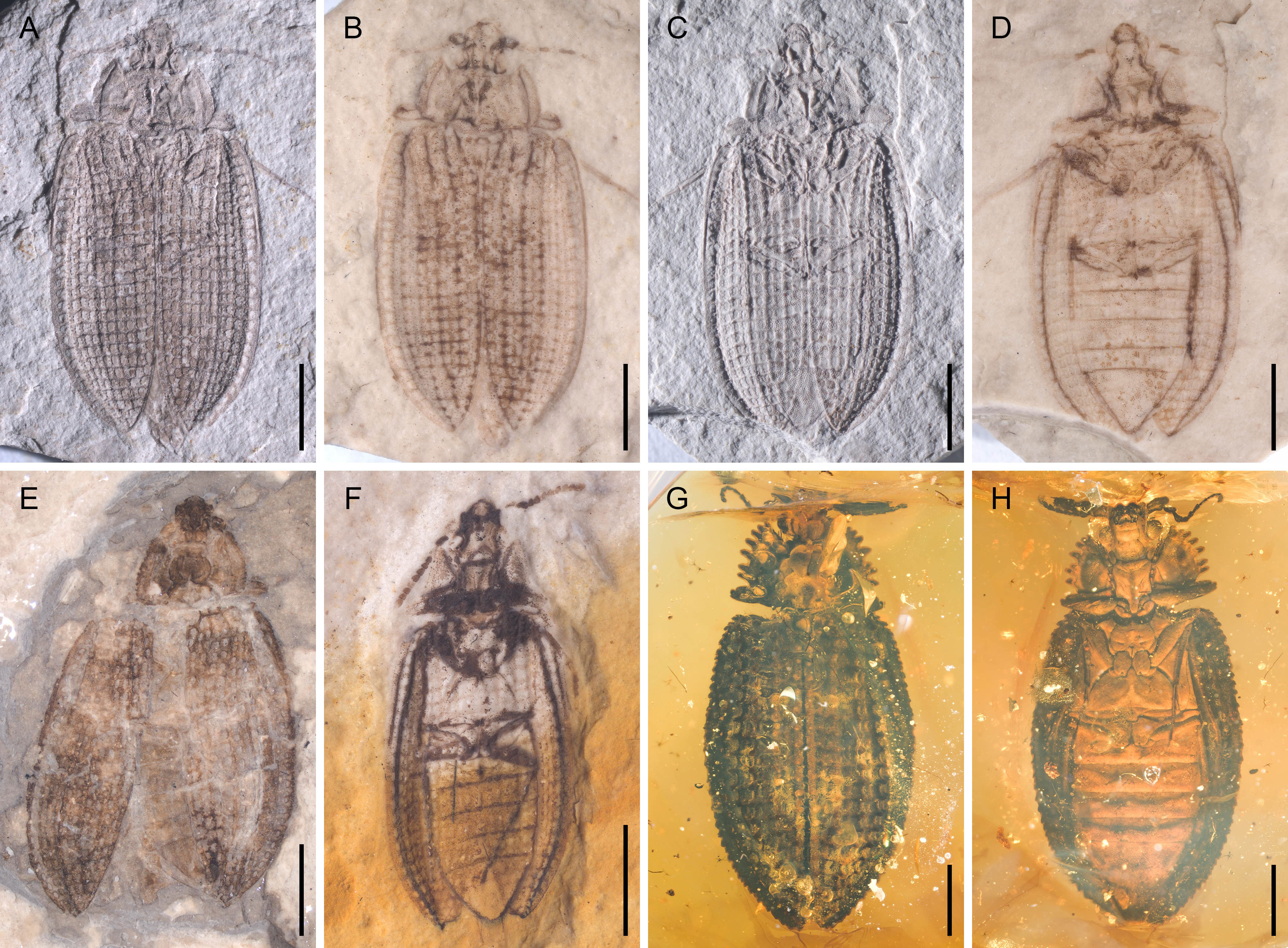
- Various specimens of Notocupes from the Middle Jurassic of China and mid-Cretaceous Burmese amber

Scientific classification
- Kingdom: Animalia
- Phylum: Arthropoda
- Clade: Pancrustacea
- Class: Insecta
- Order: Coleoptera
- Suborder: Archostemata
- Family: incertae sedis
- Genus: †Notocupes; Ponomarenko, 1964

Synonyms
- Sinocupes Lin, 1976; Chengdecupes Hong, 1983; Conexicoxa Lin, 1986 (disputed); Forticupes Hong and Wang, 1990 (disputed); Picticupes Hong and Wang, 1990 (disputed); Echinocups Kirejtshuk and Jarzembowski, 2020; Amblomma Tan et al., 2005; Ovatocupes Tan and Ren, 2006

= Notocupes =

Notocupes Temporal range: Ladinian–Turonian

Extinct genus of beetles

Notocupes is an extinct genus of medium-sized archostematan beetles from the Mesozoic Era of Eurasia, including over 50 described species. Historically, the genus was classified as a member of the family Ommatidae, but the presence of characters such as the horizontal mandibular cutting edge, separated procoxae and overlapping abdominal sternites indicate that the genus may have a closer affinity with the family Cupedidae. Notocupes is considered to be a junior synonym of Zygadenia by Kirejtshuk (2020), but other researchers suggest to reserve the genus Zygadenia as a form taxon for isolated elytra that probably belong to the genus Notocupes, while retaining Notocupes as a valid genus for complete body fossils. Most species of Notocupes were described from compression fossils. An additional three species were described from Cenomanian-aged Burmese amber, which were treated as a separate genus, Echinocups, by Kirejtshuk (2020), but Li et al. (2023) consider Echinocups to be a junior synonym of Notocupes. Notocupes has a flattened body, which may suggest that it occupied narrow habitats, such as living under bark. Some species had serrated/spined margins of the carapace, which may have served as a defense against predators, or served as camouflage to resemble bark.

Strelnikova & Yan (2023) advise splitting up the genus Notocupes into four genera: Notocupes, Rhabdocupes, Conexicoxa and the new genus Brachilatus.

== Triassic species ==
=== Ladinian (242 Ma to ~237 Ma) ===
Tongchuan Formation, China

- N. shiluoensis (Hong, 1984) = Chengdecupes shiluoensis

=== Carnian (237 Ma to 227 Ma) ===
Koldzat Formation, Kazakhstan

- N. oxypygus Ponomarenko, 1969

Madygen Formation, Kyrgyzstan

- N. laticella Ponomarenko, 1969
- N. rostratus Ponomarenko, 1969
- N. tenuis Ponomarenko, 1969

== Jurassic species ==
=== Hettangian (201.3 Ma to 199.3 Ma) ===
Dzhil Formation, Kyrgyzstan

- N. cellulosus Ponomarenko, 1969
- N. issykkulensis Ponomarenko, 1969
- N. kirghizicus Ponomarenko, 1969
- N. latus Ponomarenko, 1969
- N. sogutensis Ponomarenko, 1969

Guanyintan Formation, China

- N. homorus (Lin, 1986) = Conexicoxa homora

=== Toarcian (182.7 Ma to 174.1 Ma) ===
Guanyintan Formation, China

- N. lini Ponomarenko et al., 2012

Sulyukta Formation, Kyrgyzstan

- N. crassus Ponomarenko, 1969

=== Bajocian (170.3 Ma to 168.3 Ma) ===
Bakhar Formation, Mongolia

- N. brachycephalus Ponomarenko, 1994
- N. exiguus Ponomarenko, 1994
- N. longicollis Ponomarenko, 1994

=== Callovian (166.1 Ma to 163.5 Ma) ===
Haifanggou Formation, China

- N. daohugouensis Li and Cai in Lin et al., 2023
- N. dischides Zhang, 1986
- N. jurassicus (Hong, 1983) = Chengdecupes jurassicus
- N. pingi Ponomarenko and Ren, 2010
- N. robustus Li and Cai in Lin et al., 2023
- N. spinosus Li and Cai in Lin et al., 2023

Tyumen Formation, Russia

- N. patulus Ponomarenko, 1985

=== Oxfordian (163.5 Ma to 157.3 Ma) ===
Karabastau Formation, Kazakhstan

- N. foersteri Ponomarenko, 1971
- N. lapidarius Ponomarenko, 1968
- N. nigromonticola Ponomarenko, 1968
- N. picturatus Ponomarenko, 1964
- N. pulcher Ponomarenko, 1968

=== Tithonian (152.1 Ma to 145.0 Ma) ===
Shar Teeg, Mongolia

- N. brachycephalus Ponomarenko, 1994
- N. exiguus Ponomarenko, 1994

Solnhofen, Germany

- N. reticulatus (Oppenheim, 1888) = Procarabus reticulatus
- N. tripartitus (Oppenheim, 1888) = Procarabus tripartitus

== Cretaceous species ==
=== Hauterivian (132.9 Ma to 129.4 Ma) ===
Dabeigou Formation, China

- N. lentus (Ren, 1995) = Tetraphalerus lentus

=== Barremian (129.4 Ma to 125.0 Ma) ===
Jianshangou Formation, China

- N. laetus (Lin, 1976)

La Huérguina Formation, Las Hoyas, Spain

- N. diazromerali (Soriano & Delclòs, 2006) = Zygadenia diazromerali
- N. longicoxa (Soriano & Delclòs, 2006) = Zygadenia longicoxa
- N. siniestri (Soriano & Delclòs, 2006) = Zygadenia siniestri
- N. viridis (Soriano & Delclòs, 2006) = Zygadenia viridis

La Pedrera de Rúbies Formation, Spain

- N. martinclosas (Soriano & Delclòs, 2006) = Zygadenia martinclosas
- N. oculatus (Soriano & Delclòs, 2006) = Zygadenia oculata

Ulan-Argalant Formation, Mongolia

- N. mongolicus Ponomarenko, 1994

=== Aptian (125.0 to ~113.0 Ma) ===
Argun Formation, Russia

- N. semen (Ponomarenko, 2000) = Zygadenia semen
- N. sibiricus (Ponomarenko, 2000) = Zygadenia sibirica

Baojiatun Formation, China

- N. baojiatunensis (Hong, 1992) = Chengdecupes baojiatunensis

Crato Formation, Brazil

- N. cratoensis Biffi, Lepeco, & Beutel. 2026

Dzun-Bain Formation, Mongolia

- N. dundulaensis Ponomarenko, 1994
- N. elegans Ponomarenko, 1994

Jehol Group, China

- N. validus (Lin, 1976) = Sinocupes validus

Khasurty Formation, Russia

- N. khasurtyiensis Strelnikova, 2019

Laiyang Formation, China

- N. laiyangensis (Hong, 1990) = Forticupes laiyangensis
- N. ludongensis Wang and Liu, 1996
- N. tuanwangensis (Hong, 1990) = Picticupes tuanwangensis

Shahai Formation, China

- N. kezuoensis (Hong, 1987) = Chengdecupes kezuoensis

Yixian Formation, China

- N. alienus (Tan and Ren, 2006) = Ovatocupes alienus
- N. cyclodontus (Tan et al., 2006) = Amblomma cyclodonta
- N. epicharis (Tan et al., 2005) = Amblomma epicharis
- N. eumeurus (Tan et al., 2006) = Amblomma eumeura
- N. minisculus (Tan et al., 2006) = Amblomma miniscula
- N. porrectus (Tan et al., 2006) = Amblomma porrecta
- N. protensus (Tan et al., 2006) = Amblomma protensa
- N. psilatus (Tan et al., 2005) = Amblomma psilata
- N. rudis (Tan et al., 2006) = Amblomma rudis
- N. stabilis (Tan et al., 2006) = Amblomma stabilis

Zaza Formation, Russia

- N. caudatus Ponomarenko, 1966
- N. excellens Ponomarenko, 1966
- N. vitimensis Ponomarenko, 1966

=== Albian (~113.0 to 100.5 Ma) ===
Jinju Formation, South Korea

- N. premeris Lee et al., 2022

=== Cenomanian (100.5 to 93.9 Ma) ===
Burmese amber, Myanmar

- N. denticollis Jiang et al., 2020 (sometimes placed in separate genus Echinocups)
- N. neli Tihelka et al., 2019 (sometimes placed in separate genus Echinocups)
- N. ohmkuhnlei Jarzembowski et al., 2019 (sometimes placed in separate genus Echinocups)

=== Turonian (93.9 to 89.8 Ma) ===
Emanra Formation, Russia

- N. khetanensis Ponomarenko in Cromov et al., 1993

Kzyl-Zhar Locality, Kazakhstan

- N. caducus Ponomarenko, 1969
