= Naibiidae =

Naibiidae Temporal range: Late Triassic–Lutetian

Scientific classification
- Domain: Eukaryota
- Kingdom: Animalia
- Phylum: Arthropoda
- Class: Insecta
- Order: Hemiptera
- Suborder: Sternorrhyncha
- Infraorder: †Naibiomorpha
- Superfamily: †Naibioidea
- Family: †Naibiidae; Shcherbakov, 2007

Extinct family of true bugs

Naibiidae is an extinct family of aphids in the order Hemiptera. There are at least three genera and four described species in Naibiidae.

== Genera ==
These three genera belong to the family Naibiidae:

- † Coccavus Shcherbakov, 2007
- † Naibia Shcherbakov, 2007
- † Panirena Shcherbakov, 2007
