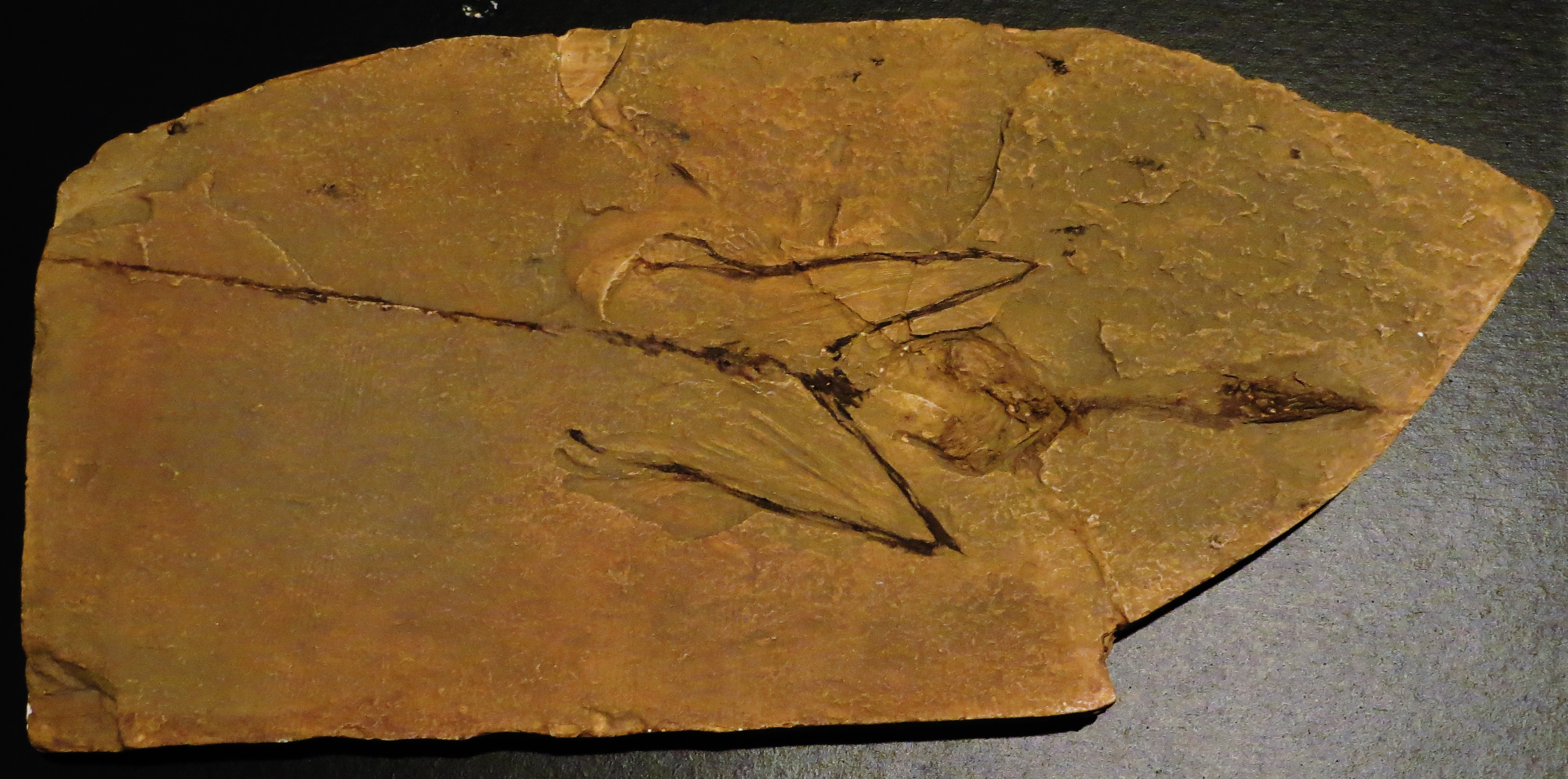
- Cast of the holotype specimen

Scientific classification
- Kingdom: Animalia
- Phylum: Chordata
- Class: Reptilia
- Family: †Sharovipterygidae
- Genus: †Sharovipteryx; Cowen, 1981

Type species
- †Sharovipteryx mirabilis (Sharov, 1971)

Synonyms
- Podopteryx mirabilis Sharov, 1971 (preoccupied)

= Sharovipteryx =

Sharovipteryx Temporal range: Middle Triassic-Late Triassic, 225 Ma

Extinct genus of reptiles

Sharovipteryx ("Sharov's wing", known until 1981 as Podopteryx, "foot wing") is a genus of early gliding reptiles containing the single species Sharovipteryx mirabilis. It is known from a single fossil and is the only glider with a membrane surrounding the pelvis instead of the pectoral girdle. This lizard-like reptile was found in 1965 in the Madygen Formation, Dzailauchou, on the southwest edge of the Fergana Valley in Kyrgyzstan, in what was then the Asian part of the U.S.S.R. dating to the middle-late Triassic period (about 225 million years ago). The Madygen horizon displays flora that put it in the Upper Triassic. Another unusual reptile, Longisquama, was also found there.

== History of discovery ==
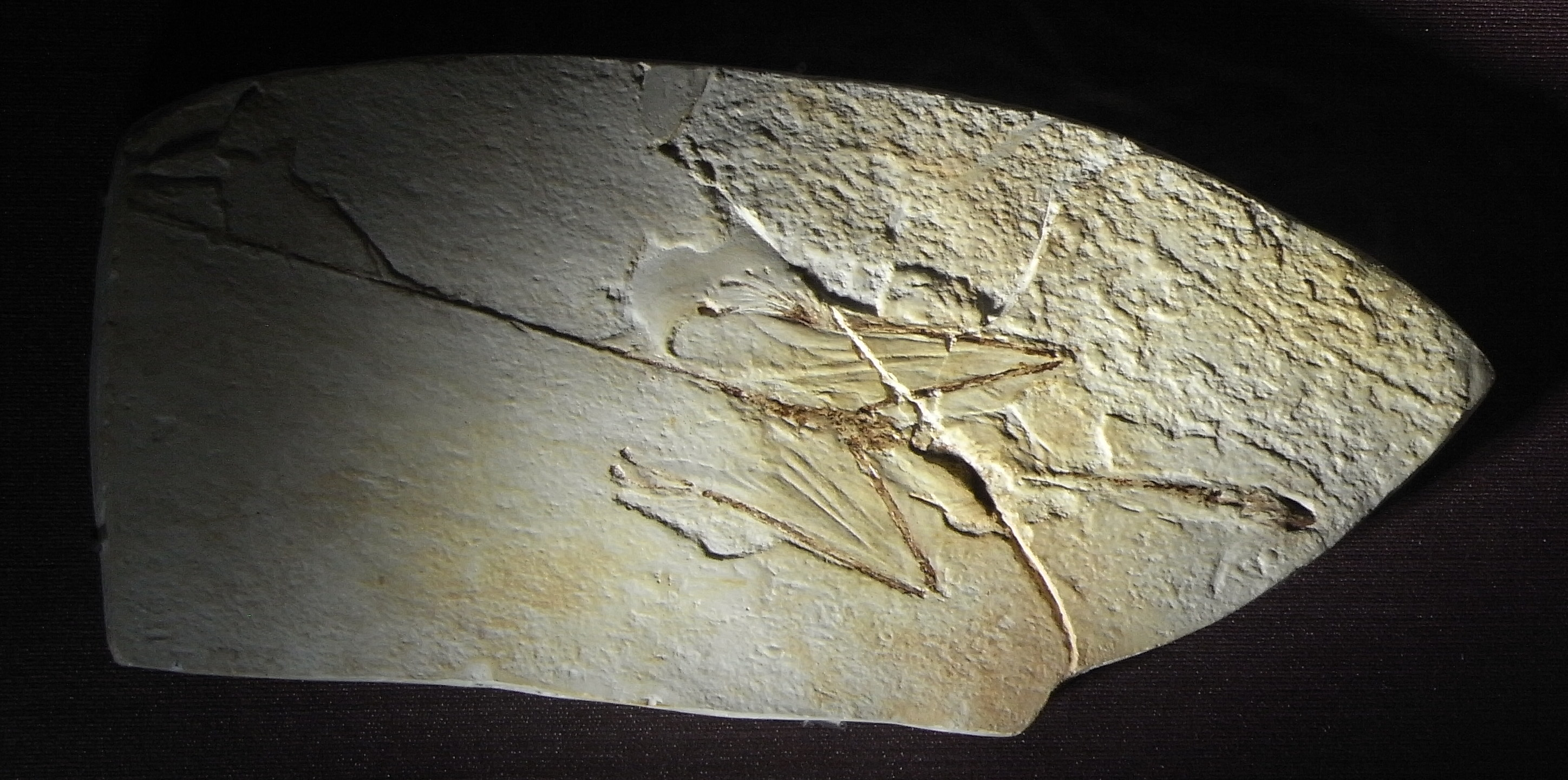
Cast of the holotype specimen

S. mirabilis is known from a unique holotype specimen, which was first described by Aleksandr Grigorevich Sharov in 1971. Sharov named the species Podopteryx mirabilis, "foot wing", for the wing membranes on the hind limbs. However, that name had previously been used for a genus of damselfly, Podopteryx, so in 1981 Richard Cowen created the new genus name Sharovipteryx for the species.

== Description ==
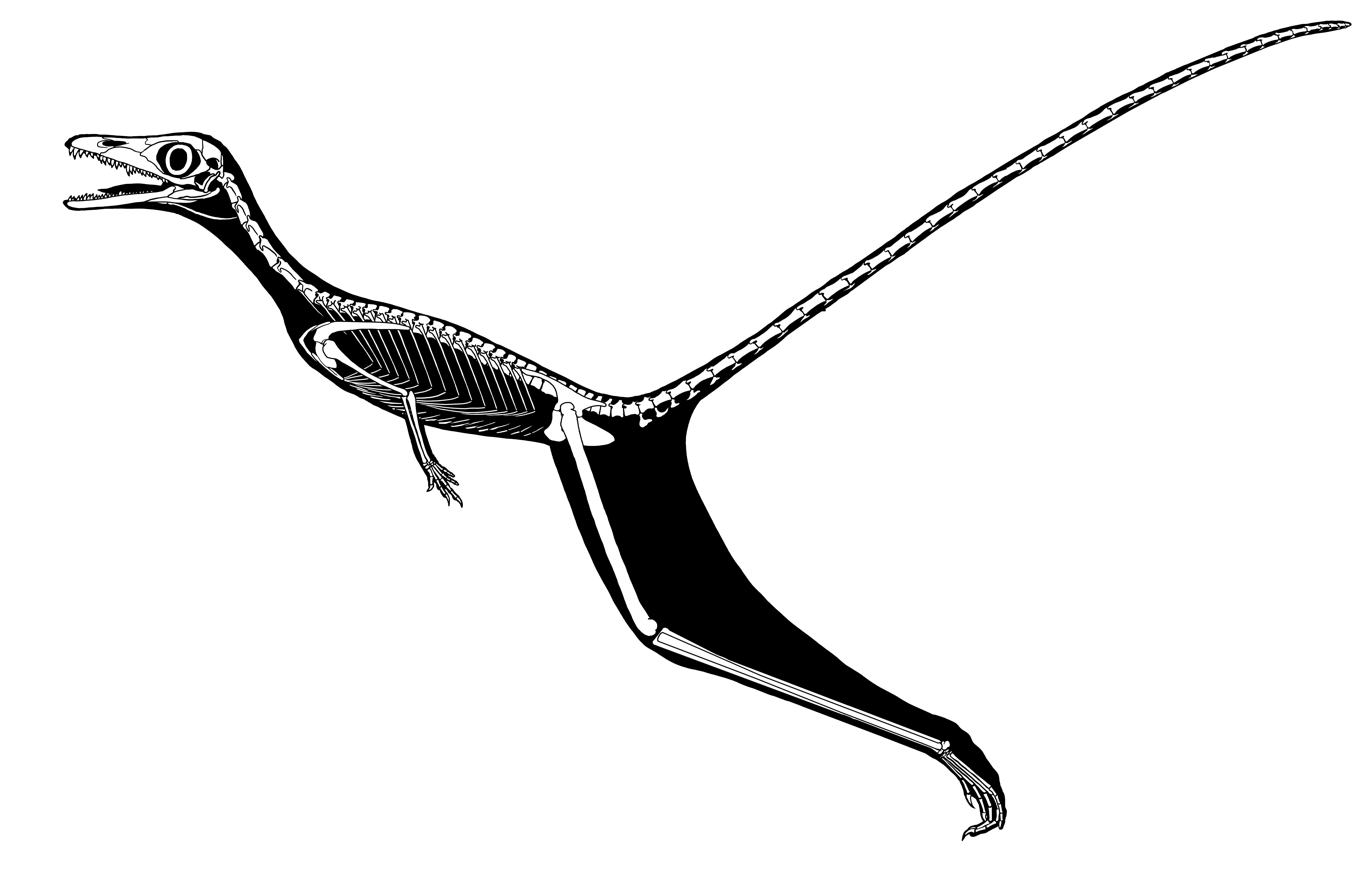
Speculative skeletal diagram

Size of Sharovipteryx (as reconstructed by Dyke et al. 2006) compared to a human hand and Draco volans, a modern gliding lizard

The skeleton is preserved in dorsal view and largely complete, with the bones still articulated and impressions of some of the integument. But part of the pectoral girdle is missing and part is still encased in stone. The total preserved length is approximately 19 centimetres (7.5 in) including the incomplete tail. The skull is relatively slender, around 1.9 centimetres (0.75 in) long, with the neck also being elongate, around 2.5 centimetres (0.98 in) (as measured from the occiput to the shoulder girdle) in length. The body is around 3.5 centimetres (1.4 in) in length from the shoulder girdle to the pelvis. The forelimbs and pectoral girdle are poorly known (Unwin and colleagues in a 2000 publication suggested that the forelimbs may still be hidden beneath the rock surface). The hindlimbs are proportionally very large relative to body size, with the tibia being around 3.7–3.8 centimetres (1.5–1.5 in) long and the femur at least 3.4 centimetres (1.3 in) in length. Around the hindlimbs is preserved soft tissue of a patagium membrane that stretched between them. The Gans and colleagues 1987 redescription found that the patagium did not extend to the forelimbs. The vertebrae are relatively elongate, and the hyoid bones of the throat are relatively elongate towards the posterior of the animal. The preacetabular process of ilium (part of the hip) is well developed on the part of the bone facing towards the front (anterior end) of the animal, and there is a pulley-like process on the end of the femur closest to the knee.

== Gliding ==
Gans and colleagues 1987 redescription used models showed that the reptile could glide with the patagium attached to its hind limbs and stabilize its glide by changing the angles of its forelimbs to provide an aeronautic canard or by bending its tail up or down to produce drag.

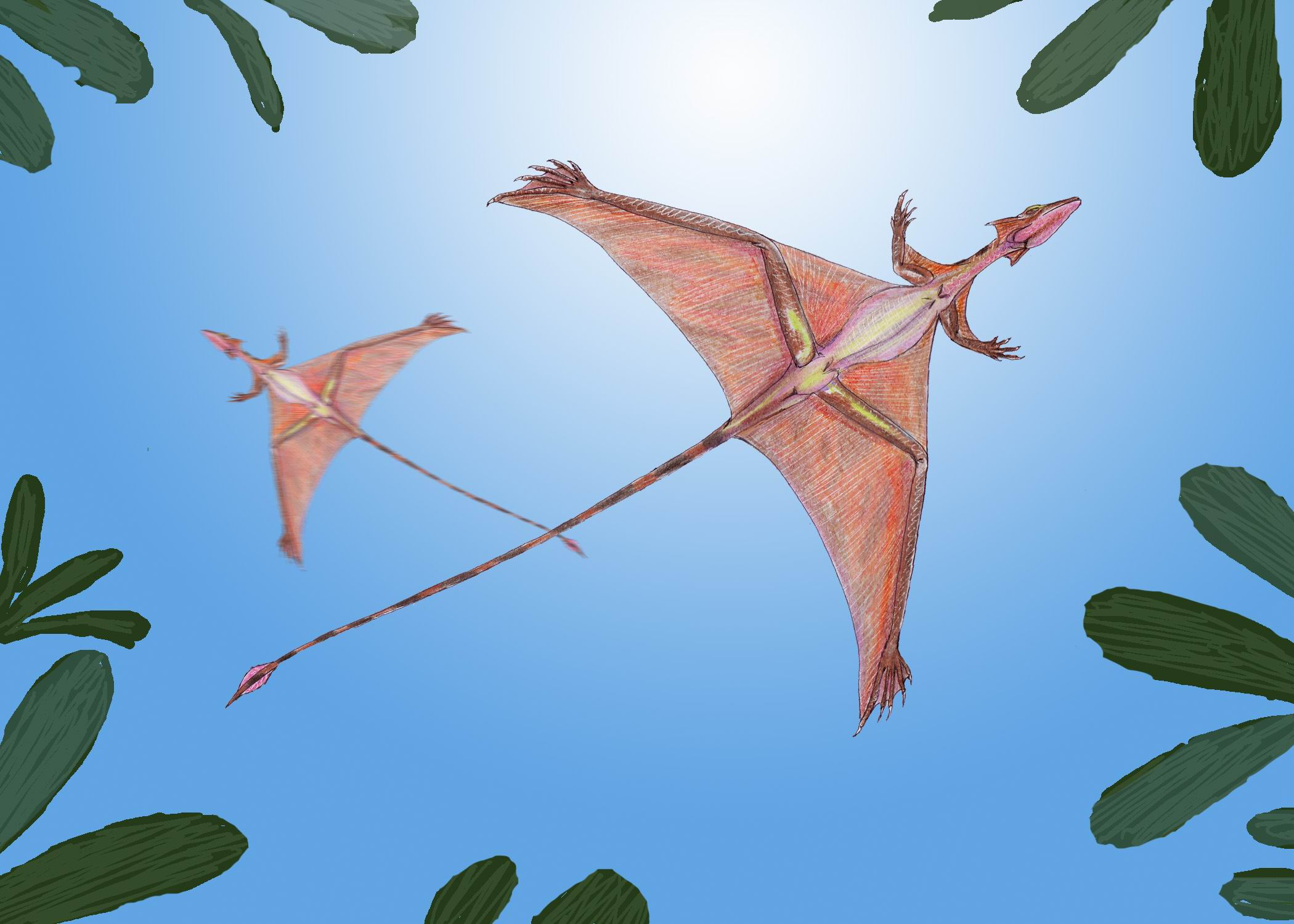
Restoration

In 2006, Dyke et al. published a study on possible gliding techniques for Sharovipteryx. The authors found that the wing membrane, which stretched between its very long hind legs and tail, would have allowed it to glide as a delta wing aircraft does. If the tiny front limbs also supported a membrane, they could have acted as a very efficient means of controlling pitch stability, very much like an aeronautic canard. Without a forewing, the authors find, controlled gliding would have been very difficult. Together with the canards on the forelimbs, these anterior membranes may have formed excellent control surfaces for gliding. The area around the forelimbs was completely prepared away in the only known fossil, destroying any possible trace of a membrane there.

== Classification ==
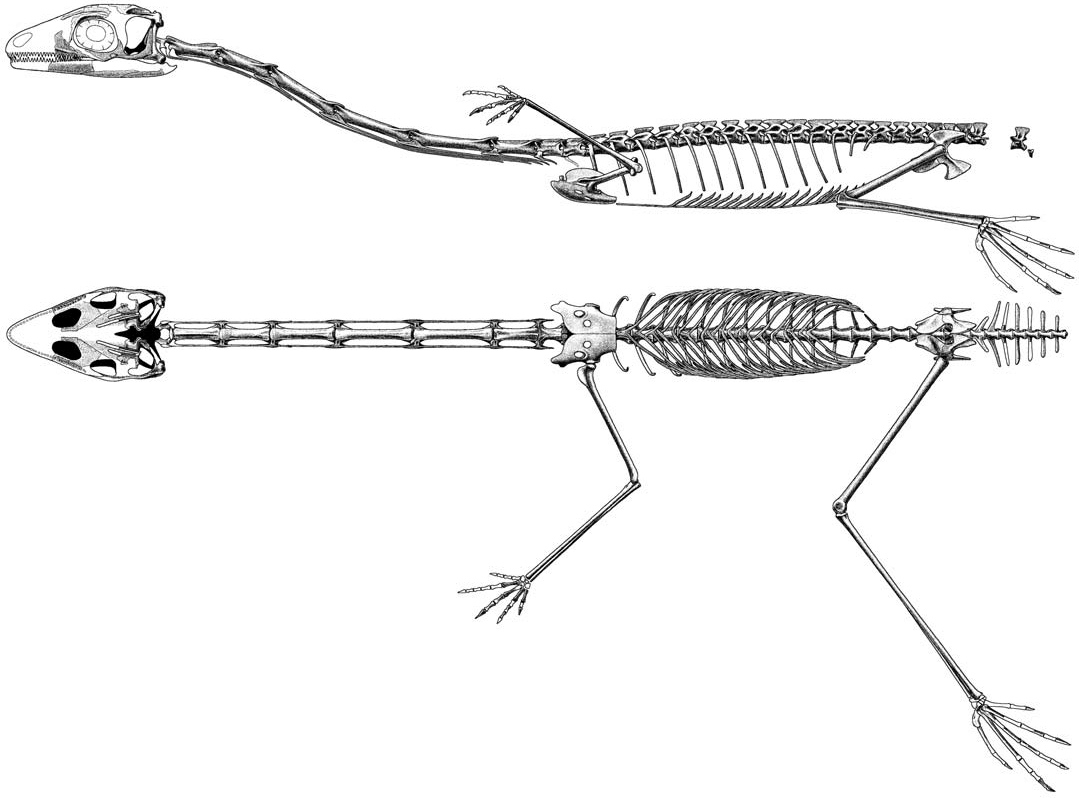
Skeleton of Ozimek volans, suggested to be a close relative of Sharovipteryx

Sharovipteryx is generally agreed to be a "protorosaur"-grade archosauromorph, making it more closely related to modern crocodilians and birds than to lizards. In 2016, a likely close relative of Sharovipteryx, Ozimek volans was described from fossil remains found in Poland, with its anatomy (which also suggests that it was a glider) supporting the archosauromorph affinities of both Ozimek and Sharovipteryx. In the phylogenetic analysis conducted by Pritchard & Sues (2019); Ozimek was recovered as a member of the family Tanystropheidae. Sharovipteryx itself was not included in this analysis, but the authors considered it possible that both Ozimek and Sharovipteryx were nested within Tanystropheidae.

== See also ==
- Coelurosauravus
- Draco volans
