= Aleksandr Sharov (footballer) =

Russian footballer

Personal information
- Full name: Aleksandr Alekseyevich Sharov
- Date of birth: 9 March 1981 (age 45)
- Place of birth: Vladivostok, Russian SFSR
- Height: 1.74 m (5 ft 9 in)
- Position: Midfielder

Senior career*
| Years | Team | Apps | (Gls) |
| 1999–2002 | FC Khimik Dzerzhinsk | 74 | (6) |
| 2003 | FC Lokomotiv-NN Nizhny Novgorod | 29 | (2) |
| 2004–2006 | FC Energetik Uren | 90 | (9) |
| 2007 | FC Znamya Truda Orekhovo-Zuyevo | 26 | (1) |
| 2008–2009 | FC Khimik Dzerzhinsk | 48 | (7) |
| 2009–2010 | FC Sheksna Cherepovets | 24 | (3) |
| 2010 | FC Khimik Dzerzhinsk | 11 | (1) |
| 2011 | FC Nizhny Novgorod | 3 | (0) |
| 2012–2013 | FC Khimik Dzerzhinsk | 35 | (1) |
| 2013–2014 | FC Sever Murmansk | 20 | (0) |
- * Club domestic league appearances and goals

Aleksandr Alekseyevich Sharov (Russian: Александр Алексеевич Шаров; born 9 March 1981) is a former Russian professional football player.

== Club career ==
He played in the Russian Football National League for FC Nizhny Novgorod in the 2011–12 season.
