= Aleksandr Grigorevich Sharov =

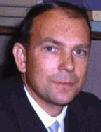
A. G. Sharov

Aleksandr Grigorevich Sharov (А.Г. Шаров, 1922–1973) was a Soviet palaeoentomologist, paleontologist and expert on Pterosauria. He graduated from Moscow State University. In 1951 he defended Candidate of Science dissertation on the embryology of Apterygota. Since 1951 he worked at the Paleontological Institute in Moscow, where in 1966 he defended dissertation of Doctor of Science. His major contribution to the phylogeny of Arthropods was published in 1966. He worked during the 1960s and 1970s on the Karatau rocks and discovered many of the fossils, of which some have been named after him, as in the case of the Karatausuchus sharovi (a crocodile), and Sharovipteryx (an early gliding reptile). He also discovered and described the specimen Sordes pilosus in 1971 and Longisquama insignis.

== Publications ==
Sharov, A. G. 1966 Unique finds of reptiles from Mesozoic of Central Asia. Byull. Mosc. Obshch. Ispyit. Prirod., Otd. Geol.

Sharov, A. G. 1970 Unusual reptile from the Lower Triassic of Fergana. Pal. Zh.

Sharov, A. G. 1971 Novyiye lyetayushchiye reptili iz myezozoya Kazakhstana i Kirgizii. New flying reptiles from the Mesozoic of Kazakhstan and Kirghizia. Trudy paleont. Inst. Moscow. Russian text with end plates.
