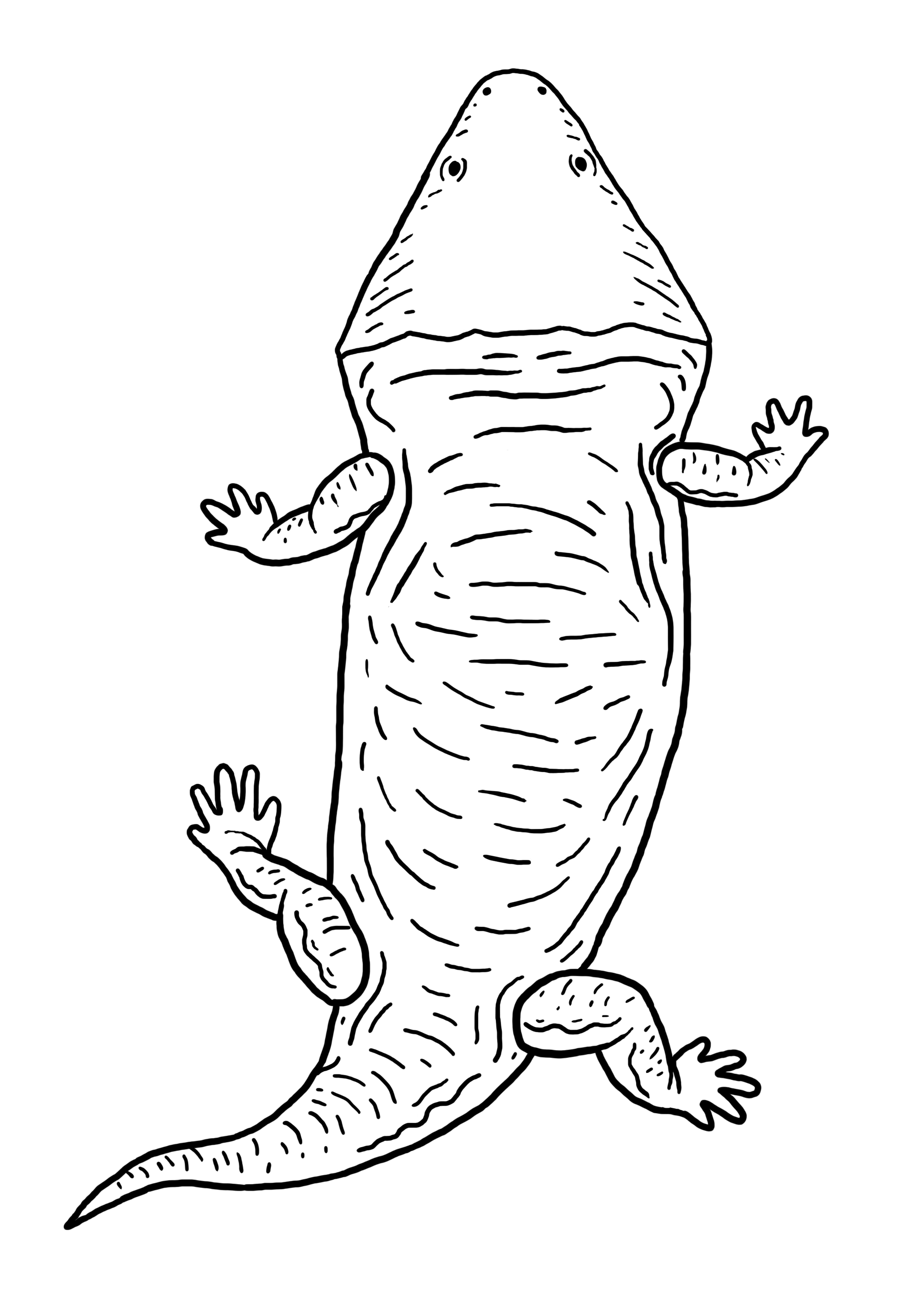
- Restoration of Trucheosaurus major
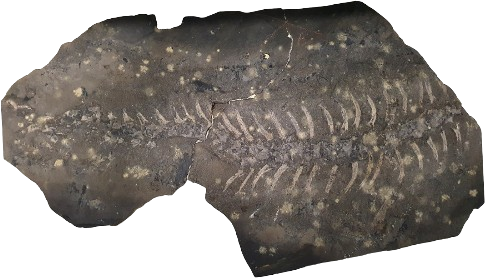
- Holotype specimen of T. major (AMF 50977)

Scientific classification
- Kingdom: Animalia
- Phylum: Chordata
- Clade: Tetrapoda
- Order: †Temnospondyli
- Suborder: †Stereospondyli
- Family: †Rhytidosteidae
- Genus: †Trucheosaurus; Watson, 1956

Type species
- †Trucheosaurus major (Woodward, 1909 [originally Bothriceps major)

= Trucheosaurus =

Trucheosaurus Temporal range: Late Permian, Lopingian

Extinct genus of amphibians

Trucheosaurus is an extinct genus of rhytidosteid temnospondyl from the Late Permian Glen Davis Formation of the Sydney Basin, New South Wales, Australia. It is known from the holotype materials MMF 12697a, a partially complete skull, AMF 50977, an articulated postcranial skeleton and BMNHR 3728, the counterpart of both skull and postcranial skeleton, recovered from the Glen Davis Formation. This genus was named by Watson in 1956, and the type species is Trucheosaurus major.

== Phylogeny ==
Below is a cladogram from Dias-da-Silva and Marsicano (2011):

- Stereospondyli
  - Benthosuchus
  - Watsonisuchus
  - - - Uruyiella
      - - Peltobatrachus
        - - Rhineceps
          - - Australerpeton
            - Rhytidosteus
    - - - Lapillopsis
        - Lydekkerina
      - Trematosauria
        - Trematosaurus
        - - Luzocephalus
          - - Chomatobatrachus
            - - Brachyopoidea
                - Bothriceps
                - - Xenobrachyops
                  - Keratobrachyops
              - Rhytidosteidae
                - - Nanolania
                  - - Trucheosaurus
                    - Laidleria
                - - Boreopelta
                  - - Peltostega
                    - - - Pneumatostega
                        - - Sangaia
                          - Mahavisaurus
                      - Derwentiinae
                        - Deltasaurus
                        - - Arcadia
                          - - Rewana
                            - - Derwentia
                              - Indobrachyops
