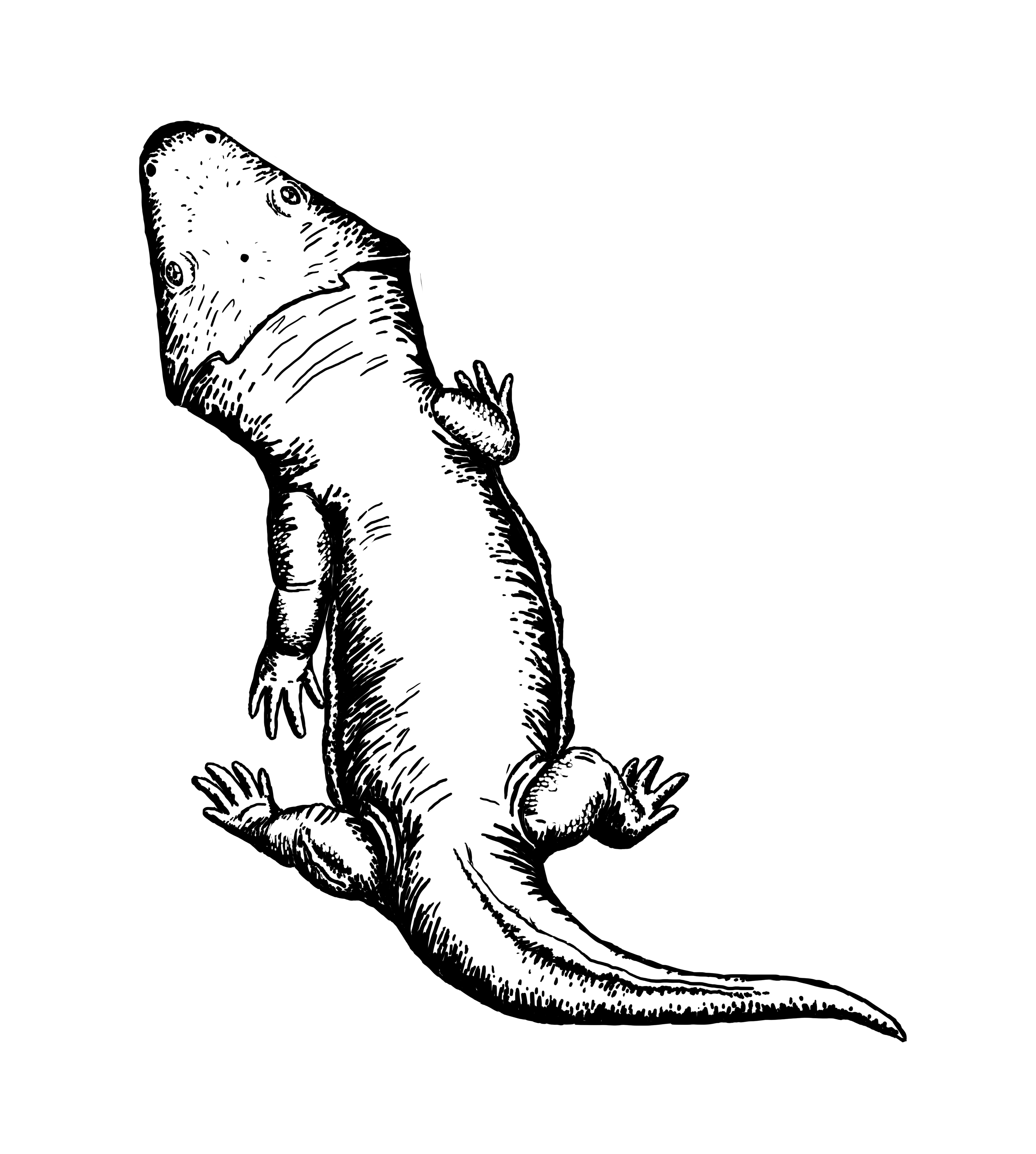
- Deltasaurus kimberleyensis

Scientific classification
- Domain: Eukaryota
- Kingdom: Animalia
- Phylum: Chordata
- Order: †Temnospondyli
- Suborder: †Stereospondyli
- Family: †Rhytidosteidae
- Subfamily: †Derwentiinae; Dias-da-Silva and Marsicano, 2011

Subgroups
- See text

= Derwentiinae =

Derwentiinae Temporal range: Permian - Triassic

Extinct subfamily of amphibians

Derwentiinae is a subfamily of rhytidosteid temnospondyls from the Permian and Triassic periods of Australia and India. It includes the genera Arcadia, Deltasaurus, Derwentia, Indobrachyops, and Rewana. Derwentiinae was named in a 2011 study that analyzed the phylogenetic relationships of rhytidosteids. It was a replacement name for the family Derwentiidae, which was named in 2000.

== Description ==
Like many other Permian and Triassic temnospondyls, derwentiines are known primarily from their skulls, which are triangular or rounded when viewed from above. Derwentiines are diagnosed as a clade (evolutionary grouping) by several shared characteristics or synapomorphies: a palate with a nearly straight back margin, a parasphenoid bone at the back of the palate that is covered in small bumps, an ectopterygoid bone on the palate that forms part of the border of a large hole called the subtemporal fossa, and a postorbital bone behind the eye that is rounded or squarish. Although derwentiines are considered the most derived rhytidosteids, the last characteristic is shared with the most primitive rhytidosteids and non-rhytidosteid temnospondyls, suggesting an evolutionary reversal. The small bumps covering the parasphenoid are an unambiguous synapomorphy because the characteristic is only in derwentiines, while all other synapomorphies are ambiguous because they are also present in some other temnospondyls such as Chomatobatrachus and Lapillopsis.

== Classification ==
Derwentiidae was named in 2000 as a family of Australian temnospondyls in the suborder Stereospondyli. The subfamily Derwentiinae was named in 2011 as a replacement for Derwentiidae because all of these Australian temnospondyls were found to be members of the family Rhytidosteidae. The 2011 analysis also placed Indobrachyops from India in Derwentiinae as the first non-Australian member of the group. Below is a cladogram from the analysis, showing the phylogenetic relationships of derwentiines and other stereospondyls:

- Stereospondyli
  - Benthosuchus
  - Watsonisuchus
  - - - Uruyiella
      - - Peltobatrachus
        - - Rhineceps
          - - Australerpeton
            - Rhytidosteus
    - - - Lapillopsis
        - Lydekkerina
      - Trematosauria
        - Trematosaurus
        - - Luzocephalus
          - - Chomatobatrachus
            - - Brachyopoidea
                - Bothriceps
                - - Xenobrachyops
                  - Keratobrachyops
              - Rhytidosteidae
                - - Nanolania
                  - Trucheosaurus
                - - Boreopelta
                  - - Peltostega
                    - - - Pneumatostega
                        - - Sangaia
                          - Mahavisaurus
                      - Derwentiinae
                        - Deltasaurus
                        - - Arcadia
                          - - Rewana
                            - Acerastia
                            - - Derwentia
                              - Indobrachyops
