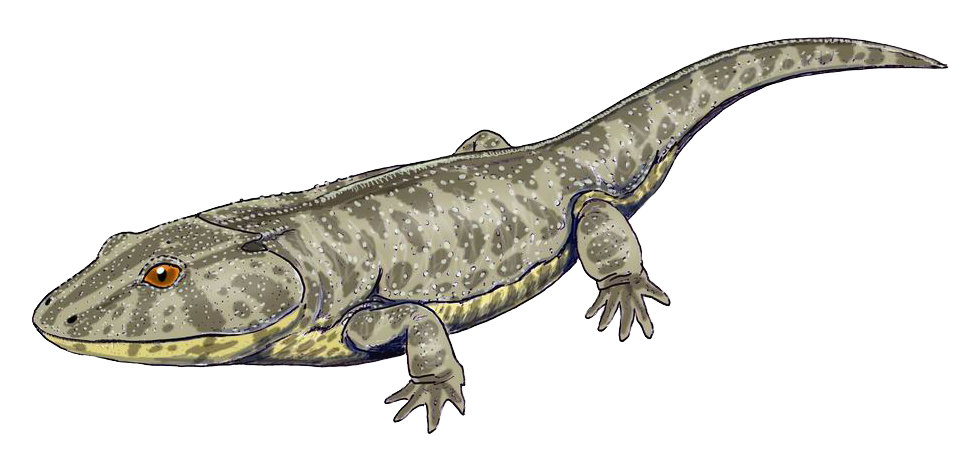
- Life restoration of Lyddekerina huxleyi, a lydekkerinid and basal rhytidostean

Scientific classification
- Domain: Eukaryota
- Kingdom: Animalia
- Phylum: Chordata
- Order: †Temnospondyli
- Suborder: †Stereospondyli
- Clade: †Rhytidostea; Shoch and Milner, 2000

Superfamilies and families
- †Lydekkerinidae; †Rhytidosteoidea

= Rhytidostea =

Rhytidostea Temporal range: Permian - Triassic

Extinct clade of amphibians

Rhytidostea is a clade of stereospondyl temnospondyls. It was erected in 2000 to include several temnospondyl groups distinct from the "higher" group of capitosaurs, including lydekkerinids, brachyopoids, and rhytidosteids. Rhytidosteans first appeared in the Permian period and underwent an evolutionary radiation during the Induan stage of the Early Triassic. Along with capitosaurs, rhytidosteans comprise much of the larger suborder Stereospondyli. Rhytidostea has often been considered the sister group of the clade Capitosauria, but has been placed in various other phylogenetic positions. In many studies, members of Rhytidostea are split, with lydekkerinids having a more basal position among stereospondyls while rhytidosteids and brachyopoids form a group placed among the more derived trematosaurian stereospondyls.

== Classification ==
Schoch and Milner (2000) erected the clade Rhytidostea to include lydekkerinids, brachyopoids, and rhytidosteids. The clade was the sister taxon of Capitosauria, the "higher" stereospondyls. Ruta et al. (2007) placed Rhytidostea in a similar phylogenetic position, defining it as a clade including Eolydekkerina (a lydekkerinid), Batrachosuchus (a brachyopid), and all descendants of their most recent common ancestor. Below is a cladogram modified from Ruta et al. (2007):

- Stereospondyli
  - - Plagiosauridae
    - Peltobatrachidae
  - - Lapillopsidae
    - - Rhinesuchidae
      - - Rhytidostea
          - Lydekkerinidae
            - Eolydekkerina
            - - Broomulus
              - - Limnoiketes
                - Lydekkerina
          - - - Deltacephalus
              - - Edingerella
                - Watsonisuchus
            - - - Chomatobatrachus
                - Luzocephalus
              - - Indobrachyops
                - - - Peltobatrachus
                    - - Laidleria
                      - Rhytidosteus
                  - - Trucheosaurus
                    - - - Acerastea
                        - - Derwentia
                          - Rawana
                      - - - Deltacephalus
                          - Mahavisaurus
                        - Brachyopomorpha
        - - Capitosauria
          - Trematosauria

Other phylogenetic analyses have placed rhytidosteids and brachyopoids as closely related groups within Trematosauria, a more derived clade of stereospondyls. They are separate from the lydekkerinids, which remain a basal group of stereospondyls.
