= Arachana =

Arachana Temporal range: Late Permian or Early Triassic

Scientific classification
- Kingdom: Animalia
- Phylum: Chordata
- Clade: Tetrapoda
- Order: †Temnospondyli
- Suborder: †Stereospondyli
- Genus: †Arachana; Piñeiro et al., 2012

Type species
- †A. nigra Piñeiro et al., 2012

Extinct genus of amphibians

Arachana is an extinct genus of rhinesuchid-like temnospondyl known from the Late Permian to Early Triassic Buena Vista Formation of northeastern Uruguay. Arachana was first named by Graciela Piñeiro, Alejandro Ramos and Claudia Marsicano in 2012 and the type species is A. nigra. It shares characteristics with both rhinesuchids and lydekkerinids, making it a transitional form between basal and more advanced stereospondyls.

== Description ==
Arachana is known from the holotype FC-DPV 1369, a three-dimensionally preserved nearly complete skull that has not been distorted. It was collected in the Colonia Orozco locality from the Buena Vista Formation of the Norte Basin. The formation spans the boundary between the Permian and the Triassic, and it is uncertain whether FC-DPV 1369 was found in rocks above or below the boundary.

Arachana shares several characters with rhinesuchids. For example, it has a large head with orbits or eye sockets placed slightly behind the mid-length of the skull. The surface of the skull is deeply pitted and the margins of the cheek regions are smooth and convex. The basioccipital bone at the back of the skull is small. On the palate, the pterygoid bone is connected to the vomer by a projection called the palatal ramus. The ramus separates the interpterygoid vacuities, two large holes in the palate. In many temnospondyls, the palatine and ectopterygoid bones also touch the vacuities, but in Arachana and rhinesuchids, the palatine ramus excludes these bones from the vacuity margins.

Arachana also has characteristics of a more derived group of stereospondyls called lydekkerinids. In both Arachana and lydekkerinids, the otic notch in the back of the skull is shallow and is not touched by the supratemporal bone as is otherwise the case in temnospondyls. Sensory sulci, grooves in the skull that held a lateral line system in life, run across the lacrimal bone but are not angled sharply as in other temnospondyls. On the palates of both Arachana and lydekkerinids, rows of palatine teeth are relatively small and the main body of the pterygoid bone is covered in small projections. None of these features are present in rhinesuchids, suggesting that Arachana was a transitional form between basal stereospondyls like rhinesuchids and more advanced forms like lydekkerinids.

The transitional features of Arachana place it as part of an entire transitional fauna that existed around the Permo-Triassic boundary. While it is uncertain whether Arachana lived before or after the Permian-Triassic extinction event, its transitional position shows that some temnospondyls were diversifying rather than diminishing across the boundary.

== Phylogeny ==
Below is a cladogram from the analysis of Piñeiro et al. (2012):

- Stereospondyli
  - Peltobatrachus
  - - Rhinesuchidae
    - - Arachana
      - - - Watsonisuchus
          - - Benthosuchus
            - Lydekkerina
        - - Arcadia
          - - Sangaia
            - - Uruyiella
              - - Laidleria
                - - Keratobrachyops
                  - - Bothriceps
                    - - Pneumatostega
                      - Plagiosauridae
