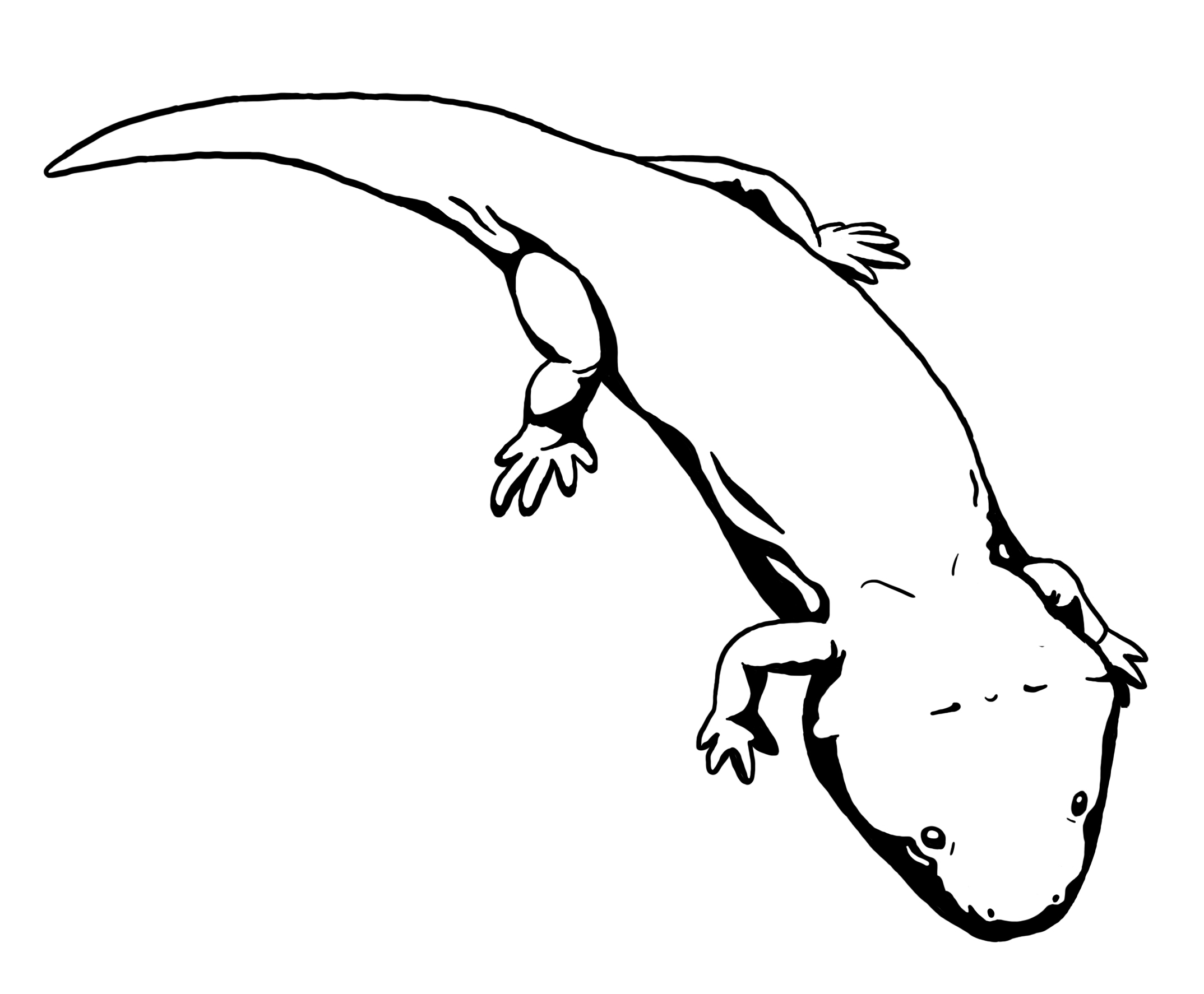
- Restoration of Indobrachyops panchetensis

Scientific classification
- Domain: Eukaryota
- Kingdom: Animalia
- Phylum: Chordata
- Order: †Temnospondyli
- Suborder: †Stereospondyli
- Family: †Rhytidosteidae
- Subfamily: †Derwentiinae
- Genus: †Indobrachyops; Von Huene and Sahni, 1958

Type species
- †Indobrachyops panchetensis Von Huene and Sahni, 1958

= Indobrachyops =

Indobrachyops Temporal range: Early Triassic, Induan

Extinct genus of amphibians

Indobrachyops is an extinct genus of temnospondyl amphibian from the Early Triassic of India. It is known from a nearly complete fossil skull that was first described by paleontologists Friedrich von Huene and M. R. Sahni in 1958 from the Panchet Formation in Raniganj Coalfield. Indobrachyops belongs to a group of mostly semi-aquatic temnospondyls called Stereospondyli, but its exact placement within the group has been uncertain since its first description.

== Classification ==
Huene and Sahni considered Indobrachyops to be part of the family Brachyopidae, which includes several aquatic temnospondyls with large rounded heads. However, later studies noted several features of Indobrachyops that set it apart from brachyopids, including closely spaced nostrils and a different pattern of pits and grooves on the skull roof. In 1979, J. W. Cosgriff and J. M. Zawiskie placed Indobrachyops in a new family called Indobrachyopidae along with the poorly known temnospondyls Mahavisaurus and Rewana. The lacrimal bone in the skull is an important feature in classifying stereospondyls, but its presence has been difficult to judge in the single known skull of Indobrachyops. One study suggested that it lacked a lacrimal, which it used as evidence to reclassify Indobrachyops within the family Rhytidosteidae. In 1998 paleontologists Anne Warren and Claudia Marsicano proposed that it did have a lacrimal, albeit a very small one that suggested a primitive position for Indobrachyops within Rhytidosteidae. A phylogenetic analysis of rhytidosteids by Marsicano and Sérgio Dias-da-Silva in 2011 supported the inclusion of Indobrachyops within Rhytidosteidae. The analysis went against Warren and Marsicano's 1998 findings by placing Indobrachyops as one of the most derived rhytidosteids. Marsicano and Sérgio Dias-da-Silva classified the genus within a new subfamily of rhytidosteids, Derwentiinae. Below is a cladogram from their study:

- Rhytidosteidae
  - - Nanolania
    - - Trucheosaurus
      - Laidleria
  - - Boreopelta
    - - Peltostega
      - - - Pneumatostega
          - - Sangaia
            - Mahavisaurus
        - Derwentiinae
          - Deltasaurus
          - - Arcadia
            - - Rewana
              - - Derwentia
                - Indobrachyops
