= Deltasaurus kimberleyensis =

Deltasaurus kimberleyensis Temporal range: Triassic

Scientific classification
- Kingdom: Animalia
- Phylum: Chordata
- Clade: Tetrapoda
- Order: †Temnospondyli
- Suborder: †Stereospondyli
- Family: †Rhytidosteidae
- Genus: †Deltasaurus
- Species: †D. kimberleyensis

Binomial name
- †Deltasaurus kimberleyensis Cosgriff, 1965

Species of amphibian

Deltasaurus kimberleyensis was a temnospondyl amphibian of the family Rhytidosteidae that existed during the Carnian stage of the Triassic. The fossilised remains were discovered in the Blina Shale formation in the Kimberley region of northwest Australia in 1965.

== Taxonomy ==
The description of Deltasaurus kimberleyensis by J. W. Cosgriff was published in 1964, nominating this as the type species when establishing the genus and providing the description for a second species, Deltasaurus pustulatus, in the material obtained in Blina Shale in the Kimberley region of northwest Australia. The holotype material is fossil material in shale of a partial skull, the skull roof and its impression with a remaining fragment of the palate, Paratypes included more fragmented material revealing other details including skull, clavicle, and jaw fossils that were also attributed to the new species.

== Description ==
A common species of Deltasaurus, smaller than the other known species Deltasaurus pustulatus, which is only known from shale in Southwest Australia. It is found with another smaller temnospondyl Chomatobatrachus halei (Lydekkerinidae), which is also common in the Blina Shale fauna, a formation at the eastern end of the Erskine Range in the Kimberley region of Northwest Australia. They have also been discovered at the Knocklofty Sandstone and Cluan Formation, fossil sites at the Tasmanian island in Eastern Australia.

Deltasaurus kimberleyensis grew to about one metre long, a moderately small predator of fish, the greatest length of the skull is around 90 millimetres. A species of Temnospondyli, early amphibians with four limbs, a tail and numerous tiny teeth that inhabited terrestrial shorelines of marine environments.
