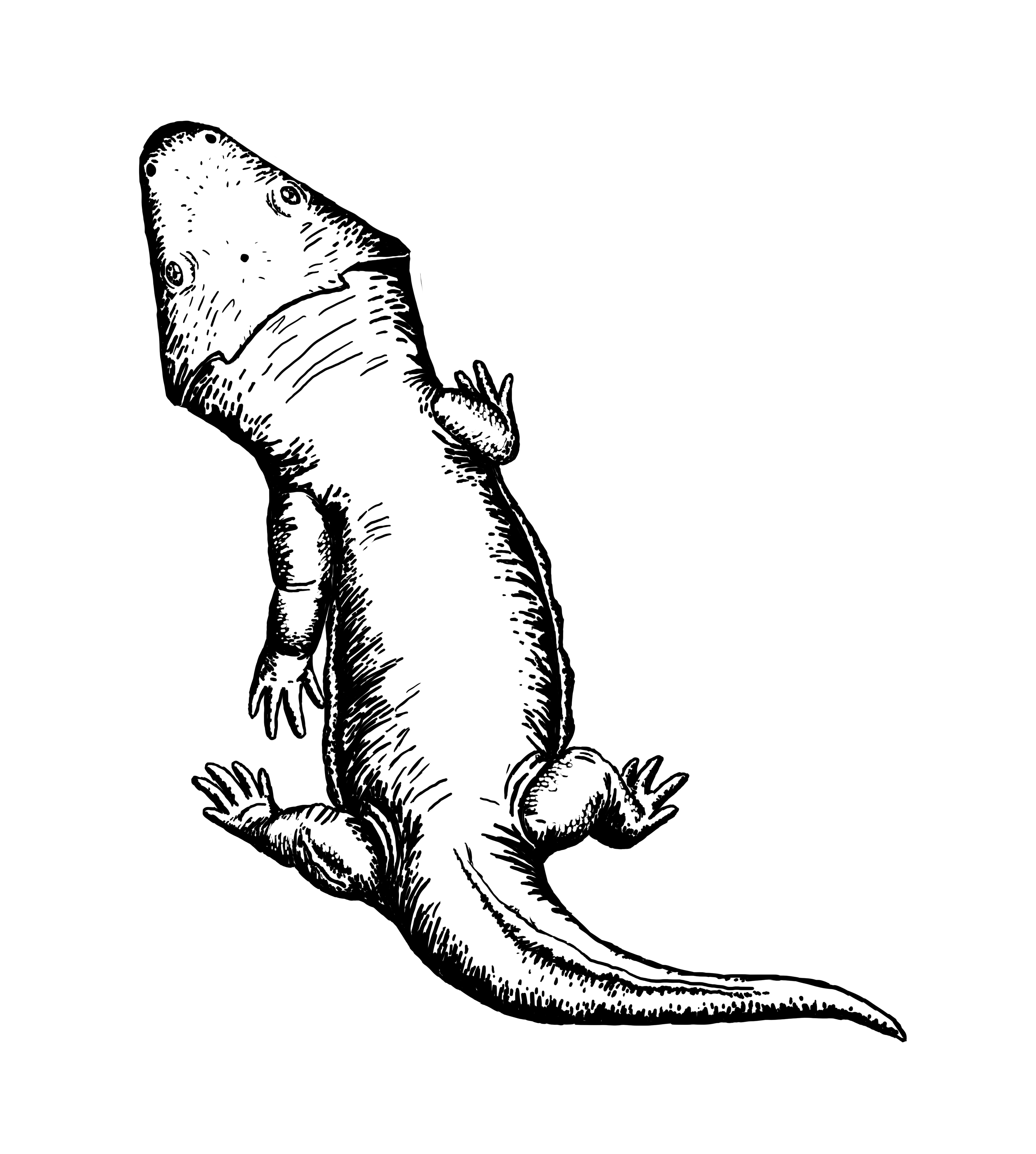
- Restoration of Deltasaurus kimberleyensis

Scientific classification
- Domain: Eukaryota
- Kingdom: Animalia
- Phylum: Chordata
- Order: †Temnospondyli
- Suborder: †Stereospondyli
- Family: †Rhytidosteidae
- Subfamily: †Derwentiinae
- Genus: †Deltasaurus; Cosgriff, 1965

Type species
- †Deltasaurus kimberleyensis Cosgriff, 1965

Other species
- †D. pustulatus Cosgriff, 1965

= Deltasaurus =

Deltasaurus Temporal range: Late Triassic

Extinct genus of amphibians

Deltasaurus is an extinct genus of Carnian temnospondyl amphibian of the family Rhytidosteidae.

== Taxonomy ==
The genus was erected in 1965 by John W. Cosgriff, when describing two new species discovered northwest Australia. The author recognised an affinity with other genera allied to the family Rhytidosteidae that had been uncovered in Africa, and proposed their arrangement to a new superfamily Rhytidosteoidea.

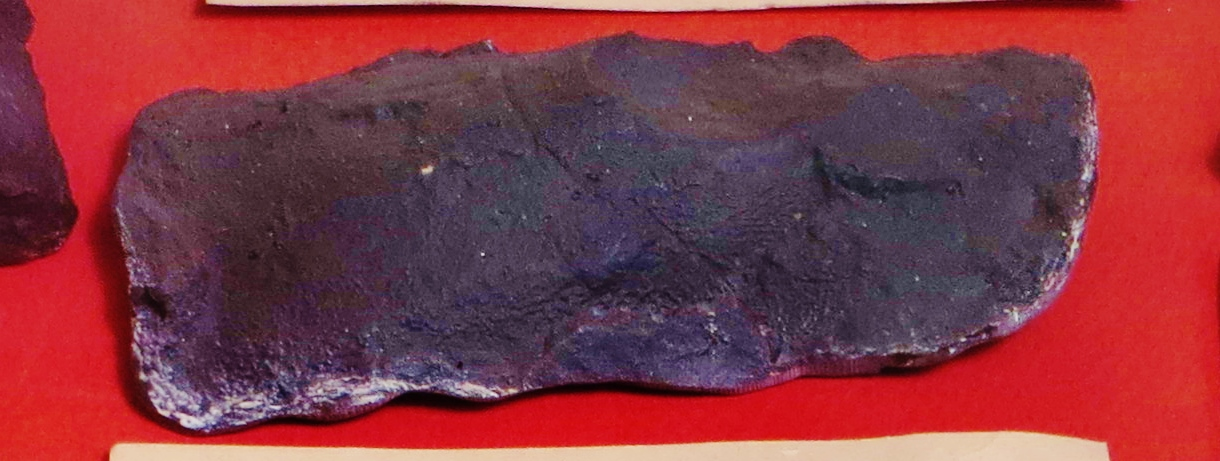
D. kimberleyensis fossil

It is the most common animal fossil of the Blina Shale, a fossil deposit at the eastern end of the Erskine Range in the Kimberley region of Western Australia. A specimen has also been collected from the Knocklofty Sandstone deposit in Tasmania.

The genus places two fossil taxa, Deltasaurus kimberleyensis, the type species which grew to around 90 centimetres in length, and Deltasaurus pustulatus, also described by Cosgriff in 1965. The genus has been variously placed in subsequent arrangements, at one time as a familia Derwentiidae that separated the Australian taxa from Indobrachyops found on the Indian subcontinent. A revision of the Rhytidosteidae (Stereospondyli: Trematosauria) published in 2011 applied phylogenetic methodologies to reassess the relationships of the genera and submerged the Derwentiidae as a new subfamily of Rhytidosteidae that included the genus Indobrachyops as an eastern Gondwanan grouping of Australian and Indian rhytidosteids.

== Distribution ==
A stereospondyl genus unearthed at sites located in Western Australia and Tasmania in shale deposits dated from the upper Permian to lower Triassic.

== Description ==
A temnospondyl amphibian of the family Rhytidosteidae. It had four limbs and a tail, and numerous tiny teeth. It is thought to have been a predator of fish. Deltasaurus are distinguished from other Australia species of Rhytidosteidae by the straight side of the skull, rather than parabolic outline of Rewana quadricuneata, Arcadia myriadens and Derwentia warreni.
