= Deltasaurus pustulatus =

Deltasaurus pustulatus Temporal range: Triassic

Scientific classification
- Kingdom: Animalia
- Phylum: Chordata
- Clade: Tetrapoda
- Order: †Temnospondyli
- Suborder: †Stereospondyli
- Family: †Rhytidosteidae
- Genus: †Deltasaurus
- Species: †D. pustulatus

Binomial name
- †Deltasaurus pustulatus Cosgriff, 1965

Type of amphibian

Deltasaurus pustulatus is an amphibian fossil species of the family Rhytidosteidae. The temnospondyl hunted invertebrates and fish during the late stage Triassic epoch, and somewhat resembles the only other species of the eastern Gondwanan genus Deltasaurus. The only known evidence of the species was discovered in a drill core in Southwest Australia, near Geraldton, a seemingly improbable event that produced the only known example of Triassic vertebrate fauna in the ecologically exceptional region's Kockatea Formation.

== Taxonomy ==
The description of Deltasaurus pustulatus was published in 1965 by John W. Cosgriff, recognised as a second species of a new genus. The type species, described in the same study, was found at Blina Shale in the northwest of Australia, whereas this species described fossil material obtained from the Kockatea Formation in the southwest of the continent, near Geraldton, Western Australia. The type locality of D. pustulatus is named Beagle Ridge Bore, where the partial remains of a skull with its impression were extracted in a 86 mm core sample of grey-green shale.

== Description ==
A species of Deltasaurus, distinguished by the bone structure and longer, narrower skull from D. kimberleyensis, the type and only other known species of the genus. The skull length of the specimen was approximately 110 millimetres. The diet is assumed to be small invertebrates and fish species.

The type material, the right side of a skull, appears to be a section of a more complete fossil and that an edge of that section was lost in the process of returning the well drilling core to the surface; the impression of the lost material remains on facing surface of the broken core. The grey-green shale of the extracted sample is otherwise uniform in its composition.

== Distribution ==
The species is only temnospondyl to have been identified at the Kockatea shale. The fine grey shale where the skull was located is likely to be a marine deposition, and there is a high degree of certainty that the remains were washed in from a terrestrial habitat at a nearby location.

The collection of vertebrate fossils in drill cores is a rare event, but greater than the earlier expectations of finds—which had been close to zero—by workers in the field of palaeontology. The depth of the sample that produced the species type and only fossil material was between 797 and 800 metres, revealed during an examination of a drill core made in a state survey of mineral resources.
