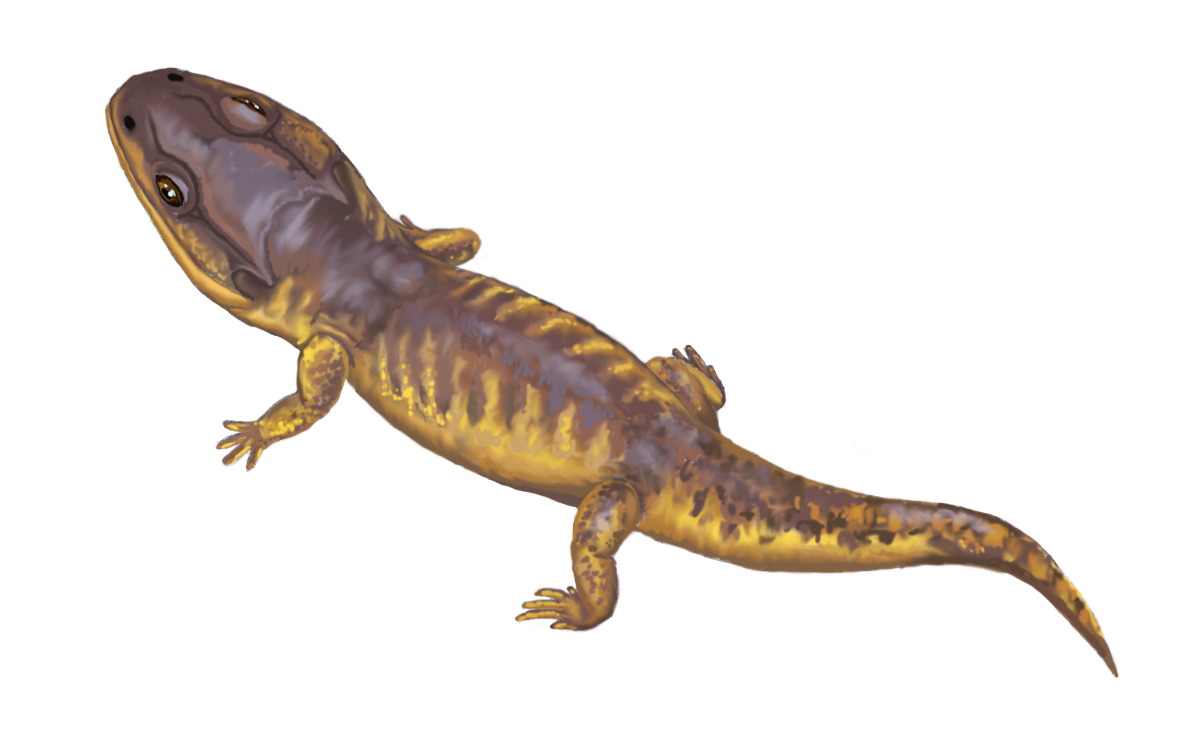
- Life restoration of the small rhytidosteid Nanolania anatopretia

Scientific classification
- Kingdom: Animalia
- Phylum: Chordata
- Clade: Tetrapoda
- Order: †Temnospondyli
- Suborder: †Stereospondyli
- Superfamily: †Rhytidosteoidea
- Family: †Rhytidosteidae von Huene, 1920

Subgroups
- See text.

= Rhytidosteidae =

Rhytidosteidae Temporal range: Late Permian - Early Triassic 252.3–Late Triassic Ma

Extinct family of temnospondyls

Rhytidosteidae is a family of Temnospondyli that lived in the Permian and Triassic.

== Phylogeny ==
Below is a cladogram from Dias-da-Silva and Marsicano (2011):

- Stereospondyli
  - Benthosuchus
  - Watsonisuchus
  - - - Uruyiella
      - - Peltobatrachus
        - - Rhineceps
          - - Australerpeton
            - Rhytidosteus
    - - - Lapillopsis
        - Lydekkerina
      - Trematosauria
        - Trematosaurus
        - - Luzocephalus
          - - Chomatobatrachus
            - - Brachyopoidea
                - Bothriceps
                - - Xenobrachyops
                  - Keratobrachyops
              - Rhytidosteidae
                - - Nanolania
                  - Trucheosaurus
                - - Boreopelta
                  - - Peltostega
                    - - - Pneumatostega
                        - - Sangaia
                          - Mahavisaurus
                      - Derwentiinae
                        - Deltasaurus
                        - - Arcadia
                          - - Rewana
                            - Acerastia
                            - - Derwentia
                              - Indobrachyops
