= Rhytidosteoidea =

Scientific classification
- Domain: Eukaryota
- Kingdom: Animalia
- Phylum: Chordata
- Order: †Temnospondyli
- Suborder: †Stereospondyli
- Clade: †Trematosauria
- Superfamily: †Rhytidosteoidea; Cosgriff, 1965

Families
- Indobrachyopidae? Rhytidosteidae

Extinct superfamily of amphibians

Rhytidosteoidea is a superfamily of Temnospondyli, early amphibian species that existed during the Carboniferous, Permian, and Triassic periods. The taxon was established in 1965 to accommodate two new species of Deltasaurus, the author recognising an alliance with previously described genera.
