= Deltacephalus =

Deltacephalus Temporal range: Early Triassic, 252.3–247.2 Ma

Scientific classification
- Domain: Eukaryota
- Kingdom: Animalia
- Phylum: Chordata
- Order: †Temnospondyli
- Suborder: †Stereospondyli
- Family: †Lydekkerinidae
- Genus: †Deltacephalus; Swinton, 1956

Extinct genus of temnospondyls

Deltacephalus is an extinct genus of prehistoric stereospondyl temnospondyl from Madagascar.

== See also ==
- Prehistoric amphibian
- List of prehistoric amphibians
