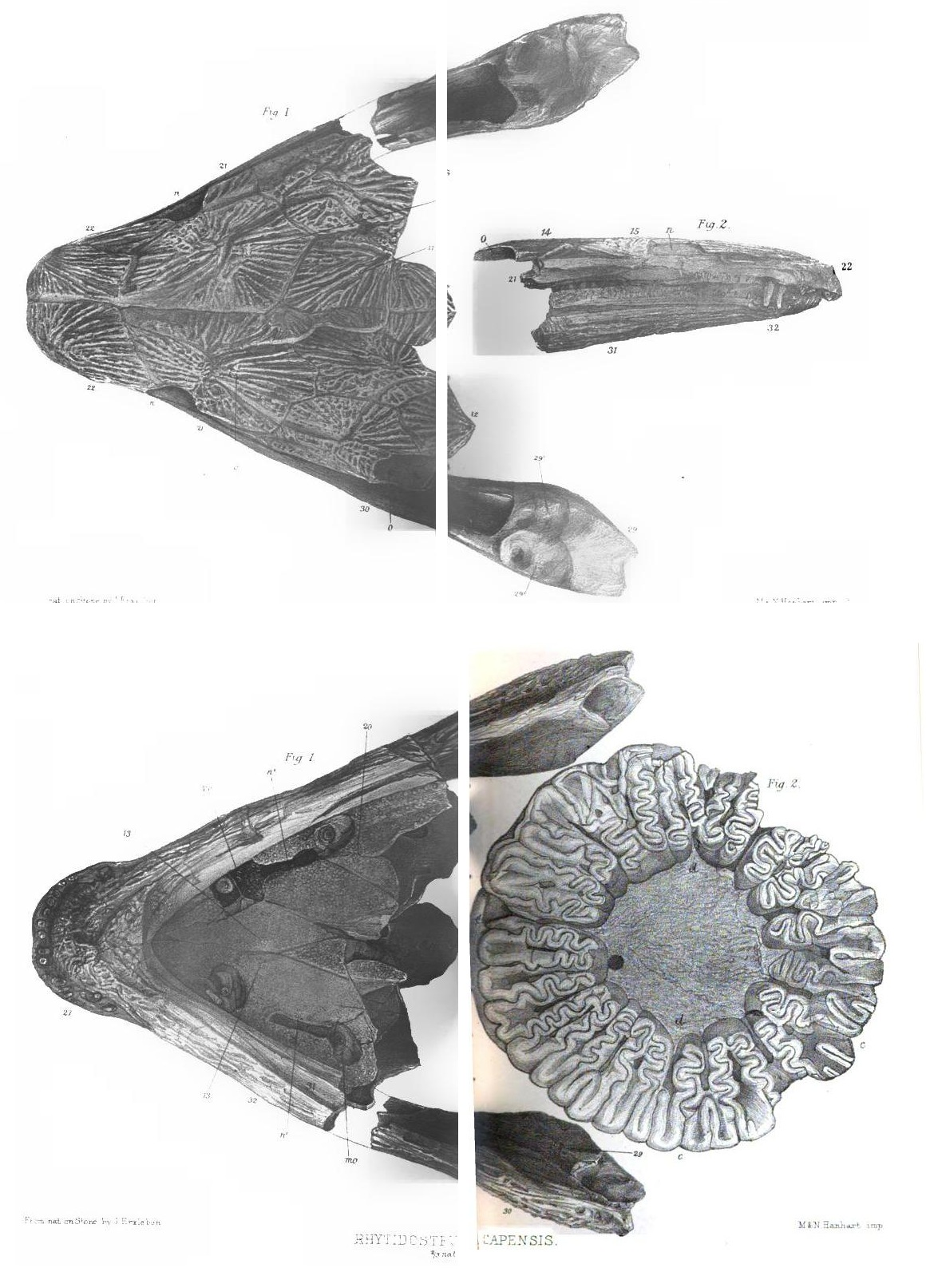
- Illustrations of the skull and a cross section of the tooth of Rhytidosteus capensis

Scientific classification
- Kingdom: Animalia
- Phylum: Chordata
- Clade: Tetrapoda
- Order: †Temnospondyli
- Suborder: †Stereospondyli
- Superfamily: †Rhytidosteoidea (?)
- Family: †Rhytidosteidae (?)
- Genus: †Rhytidosteus; Owen, 1884

Type species
- †Rhytidosteus capensis Owen, 1884

= Rhytidosteus =

Rhytidosteus Temporal range: Early Triassic

Extinct genus of amphibians

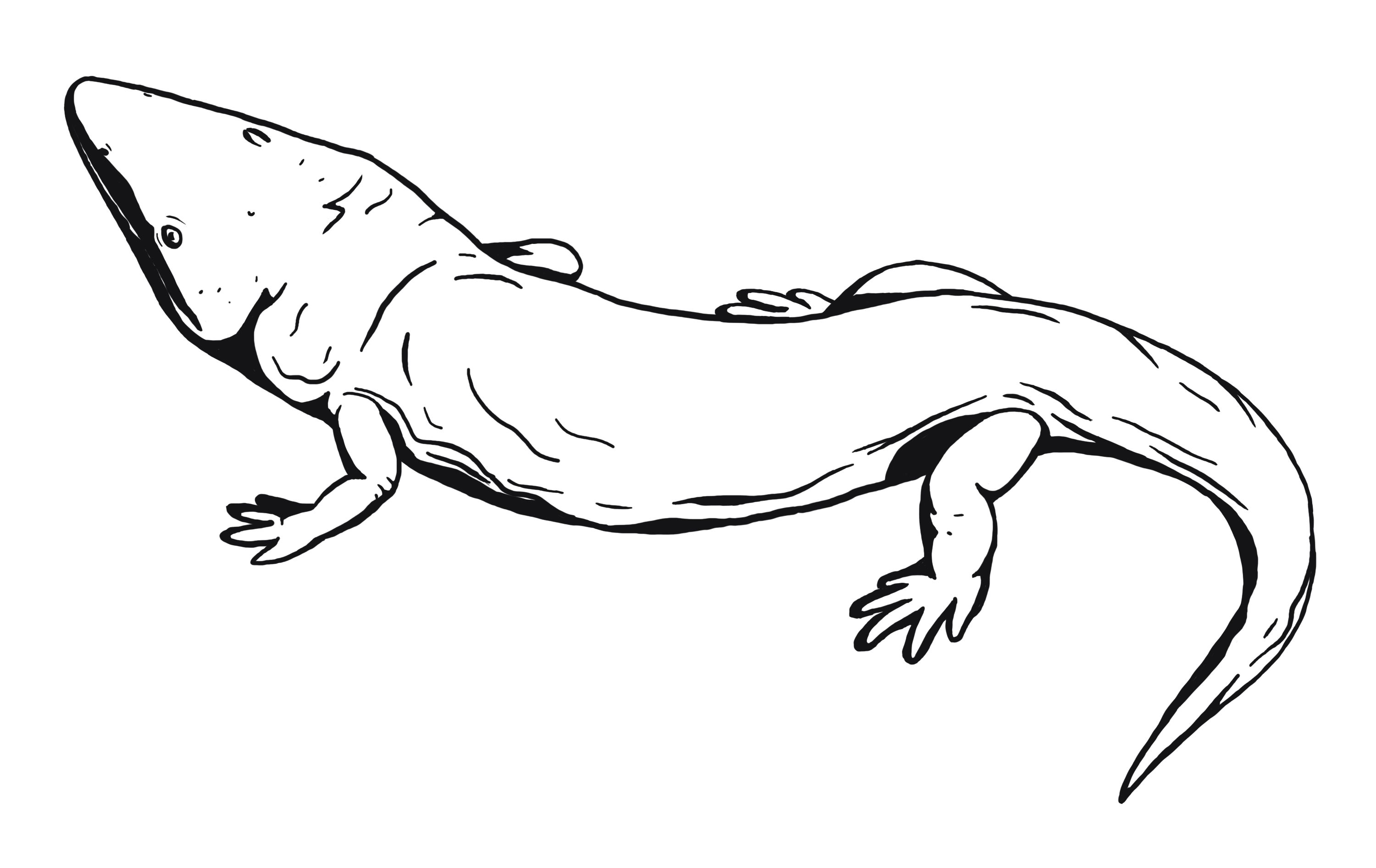
Life restoration

Rhytidosteus is an extinct genus of temnospondyl amphibian from the Early Triassic of South Africa. Initially described by Sir Richard Owen in 1884, the type species Rhytidosteus capensis was compared to the known labyrinthodont Mastodonsaurus and determined to be a unique species.

Rhytidosteus uralensis originally published and described by Shishkin from the Orenberg region of Russia, has since been determined to be a junior synonym of R. capensis.

== Phylogeny ==
Rhytidosteus was made the type species for the family Rhytidosteidae by Friedrich von Huene, however the placement of Rhytidosteus has become uncertain in recent studies. Dias-da-Silva and Marsicano recovered Rhytidosteus outside of Rhytidosteidae, the authors attribute this result to the incompleteness of the fossil and indicate that further material would resolve the placement within the family. A 2014 study recovered a paraphyletic Rhytidosteidae, with Rhytidosteus only being recovered within Rhytidosteidae sensu stricto.
