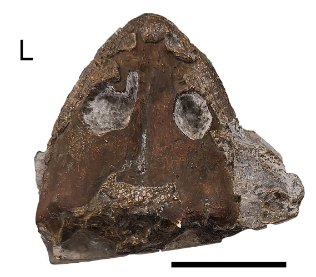
- Holotype skull of B. australis (NHMUK PV R 23110)

Scientific classification
- Kingdom: Animalia
- Phylum: Chordata
- Clade: Tetrapoda
- Order: †Temnospondyli
- Suborder: †Stereospondyli
- Clade: †Brachyopomorpha
- Genus: †Bothriceps; Huxley, 1859

Type species
- †Bothriceps australis Huxley, 1859

= Bothriceps =

Bothriceps Temporal range: Early Triassic

Extinct genus of amphibians

Bothriceps is an extinct genus of stereospondyl temnospondyl. It is a member of the infraorder Trematosauria and is the most basal brachyopomorph known. It may be the only brachyopomorph that lies outside the superfamily Brachyopoidea, which includes the families Brachyopidae and Chigutisauridae. It shares several similarities to Keratobrachyops, another basal brachyopomorph, and may be closely related to or even synonymous with it.

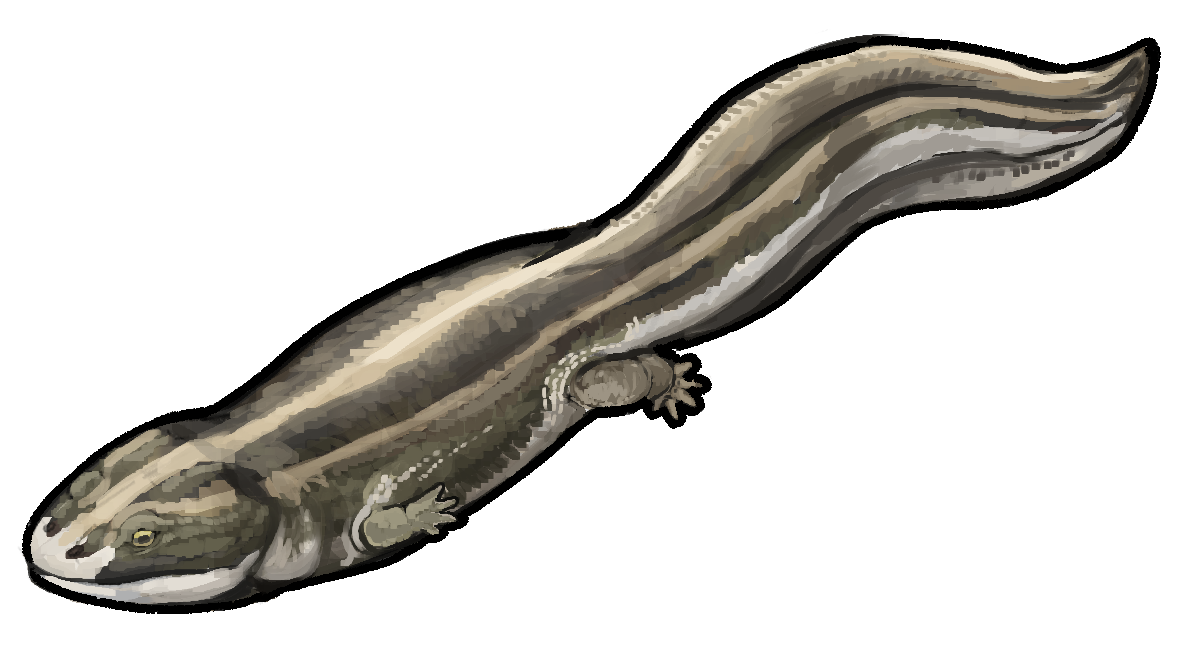
Life Restoration

The genus was named in 1859 by Thomas Henry Huxley with the description of its type species B. australis from the Early Triassic Upper Parmeener Group of Tasmania, Australia. It was originally assigned to the family Brachyopidae and was not reassigned to a more basal position until 2000, when the clade Brachyopomorpha was constructed to accommodate for it. The genus Bothriceps once included several species, but the only species assigned to it now is the type. Bothriceps major, named in 1909, was reassigned to the family Rhytidosteidae as the type species the genus Trucheosaurus in 1998. The brachyopid Platycepsion wilkinsoni (then referred to as Platyceps wilkinsoni) was reassigned to Bothriceps in 1890 and in 1969, but was placed back within the original genus in 1973.
