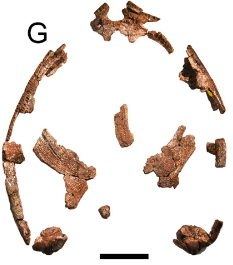
- Holotype skull of R. quadricuneata

Scientific classification
- Kingdom: Animalia
- Phylum: Chordata
- Clade: Tetrapoda
- Order: †Temnospondyli
- Suborder: †Stereospondyli
- Family: †Rhytidosteidae
- Subfamily: †Derwentiinae
- Genus: †Rewana; Howie, 1972

Species
- †R. quadricuneata Howie, 1972

= Rewana =

Rewana Temporal range: Middle Triassic (Ladinian) ~239 Ma

Extinct genus of amphibians

Rewana is an extinct genus of prehistoric temnospondyls. Two species have been described from the Ladinian age 'The Crater' locality of the Arcadia Formation in Queensland, Australia.

== See also ==
- Prehistoric amphibian
- List of prehistoric amphibians
