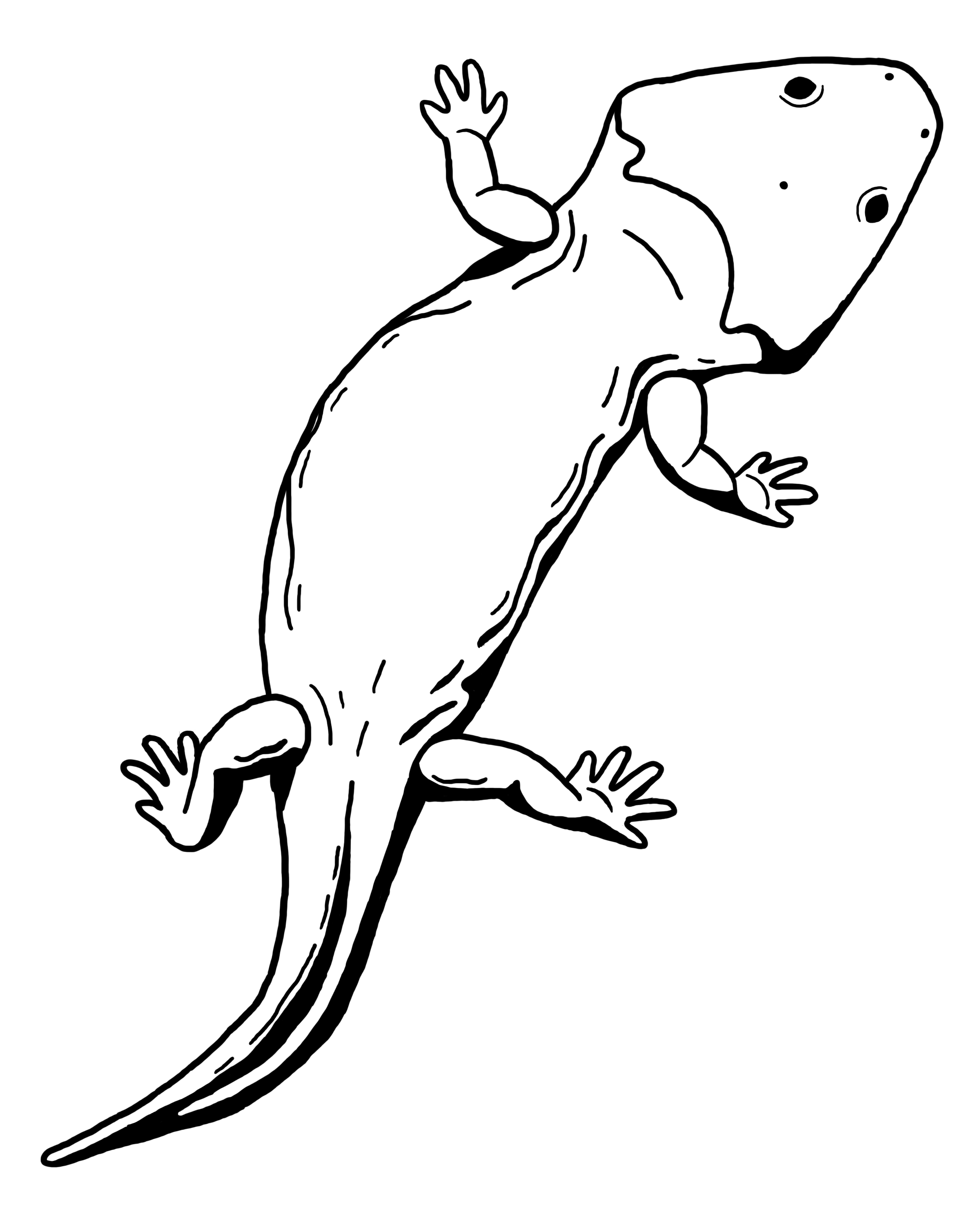
- Restoration of Boreopelta vavilovi

Scientific classification
- Domain: Eukaryota
- Kingdom: Animalia
- Phylum: Chordata
- Order: †Temnospondyli
- Suborder: †Stereospondyli
- Family: †Rhytidosteidae
- Genus: †Boreopelta; Shishkin & Vavilov, 1985

Type species
- †Boreopelta vavilovi Shishkin & Vavilov, 1985

= Boreopelta =

Boreopelta Temporal range: Early Triassic, Olenekian

Extinct genus of amphibians

Boreopelta is an extinct genus of rhytidosteid temnospondyl from the early Triassic period (Olenekian stage) of Yakutsk Region, central Siberia, Russia. It is known from the holotype PIN 4115/1, a skull fragment and from the referred specimen PIN 4113/5, a partial lower jaw, recovered from the Teryutekhskaya Formation near the Karya-khos-Teryutekh River. This genus was named by M. A. Shishkin and M. N. Vavilov in 1985, and the type species is Boreopelta vavilovi.
