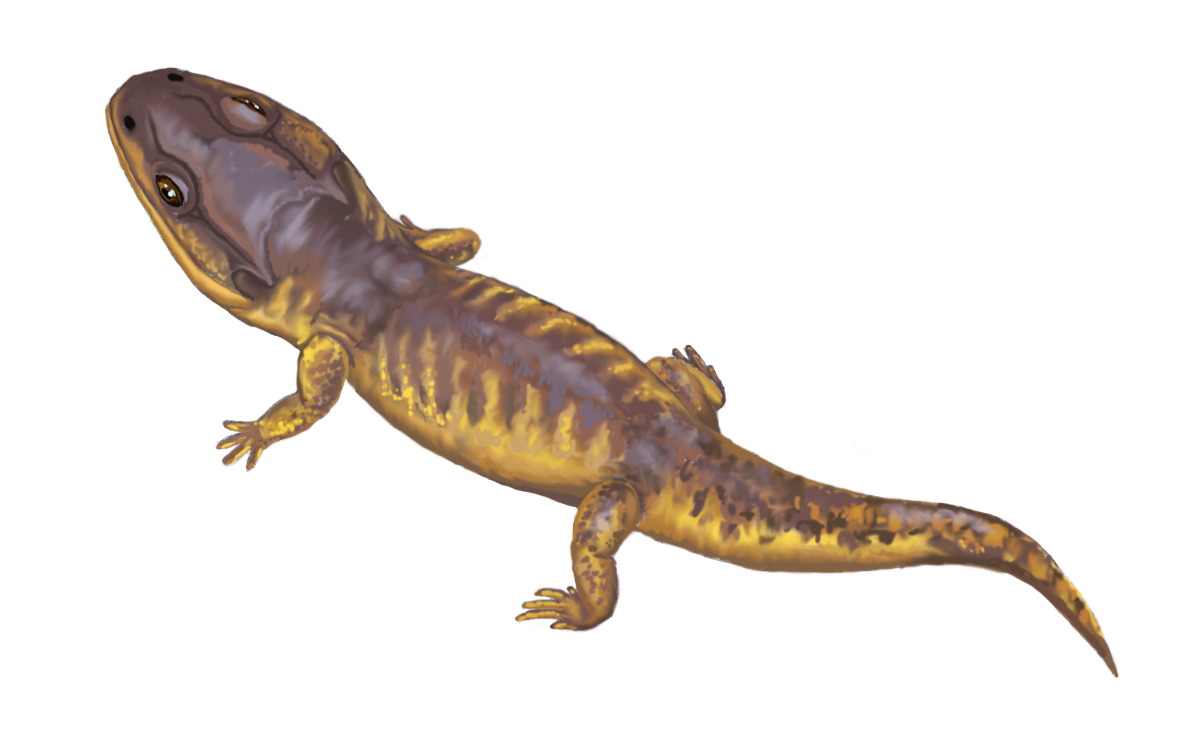
- Restoration of Nanolania anatopretia

Scientific classification
- Kingdom: Animalia
- Phylum: Chordata
- Clade: Tetrapoda
- Order: †Temnospondyli
- Suborder: †Stereospondyli
- Family: †Rhytidosteidae
- Genus: †Nanolania; Yates, 2000

Type species
- †Nanolania anatopretia Yates, 2000

= Nanolania =

Nanolania Temporal range: Lowermost Late Triassic (Carnian) ~236 Ma

Extinct genus of amphibians

Nanolania is an extinct genus of rhytidosteid temnospondyl from the lowermost Late Triassic period (Carnian age) of south central Queensland, Australia. It is known from the holotype QMF 12293, a postorbital fragment associated with lower jaw fragments and from the associated paratypes QMF 14480, a laterally complete skull with mandibles, QMF 35247, a poorly preserved skull with right mandibular ramus, QMF 35393, a badly preserved partial skull and QMF 39666, a posterior orbital and mandibular fragment, recovered from the Duckworth Creek locality of the Arcadia Formation. This genus was named by Adam M. Yates in 2000, and the type species is Nanolania anatopretia.

== History of study ==
The holotype of Nanolania anatopretia (QMF 12293) was originally provisionally described as a juvenile of the rhytidosteid Arcadia myriadens. It subsequently formed the basis for the new taxon, whose generic epithet derives from the Greek nanos (dwarf) and the Latin lanius (butcher). The species epithet derives from the Latin anas (duck) and pretium (value/worth), which refers to the type locality (Duckworth Creek, QM L215) in south-central Queensland. The hypodigm includes four referred specimens from the type locality.

== Anatomy ==
The holotype is the postorbital region of a skull with articulated hemimandibles. In concert with the paratypes, representing partial to complete skulls and associated mandibles of varying distortion and quality of preservation, most of the skull roof and occiput and some of the palate are known. Yates (2000) diagnosed the taxon by the presence of several autapomorphies, including: (1) robust, spike-like tabular horns with rectangular cross-sections; (2) small posttemporal fenestrae; and (3) a flattened temporal region that meets the posterior skull table at an angle. Other non-autapomorphic features include the loss of denticles on the palate and the presence of ornamentation on the ventral surface of the pterygoids. No postcrania are known for this taxon.

== Ontogenetic status ==
Given the small size of the specimens (the holotype is about 20 mm in length), Yates (2000) considered the possibility that they represented juveniles of the co-occurring Arcadia myriadens, as put forth for the holotype by Warren & Hutchinson (1990). Based on observations of ontogenetic changes in other temnospondyls, Yates concluded that the specimens represented a distinct taxon as the changes that would be necessary to transform into the morphology of A. myriadens (e.g., reduction in size of tabular horns) are not found in other taxa.

== Phylogenetic relationships ==
Yates (2000) identified Nanolania as a rhytidosteid, although he also noted the absence of some features that were considered diagnostic for the clade at the time and the "distinctive and highly autopomorphic" nature of Nanolania. Phylogenetic analyses have generally confirmed the placement in Rhytidosteidae, although Nanolania sometimes clusters with other small-bodied stereospondyls in broader taxon samples, perhaps due to shared features associated with unusually small size.
