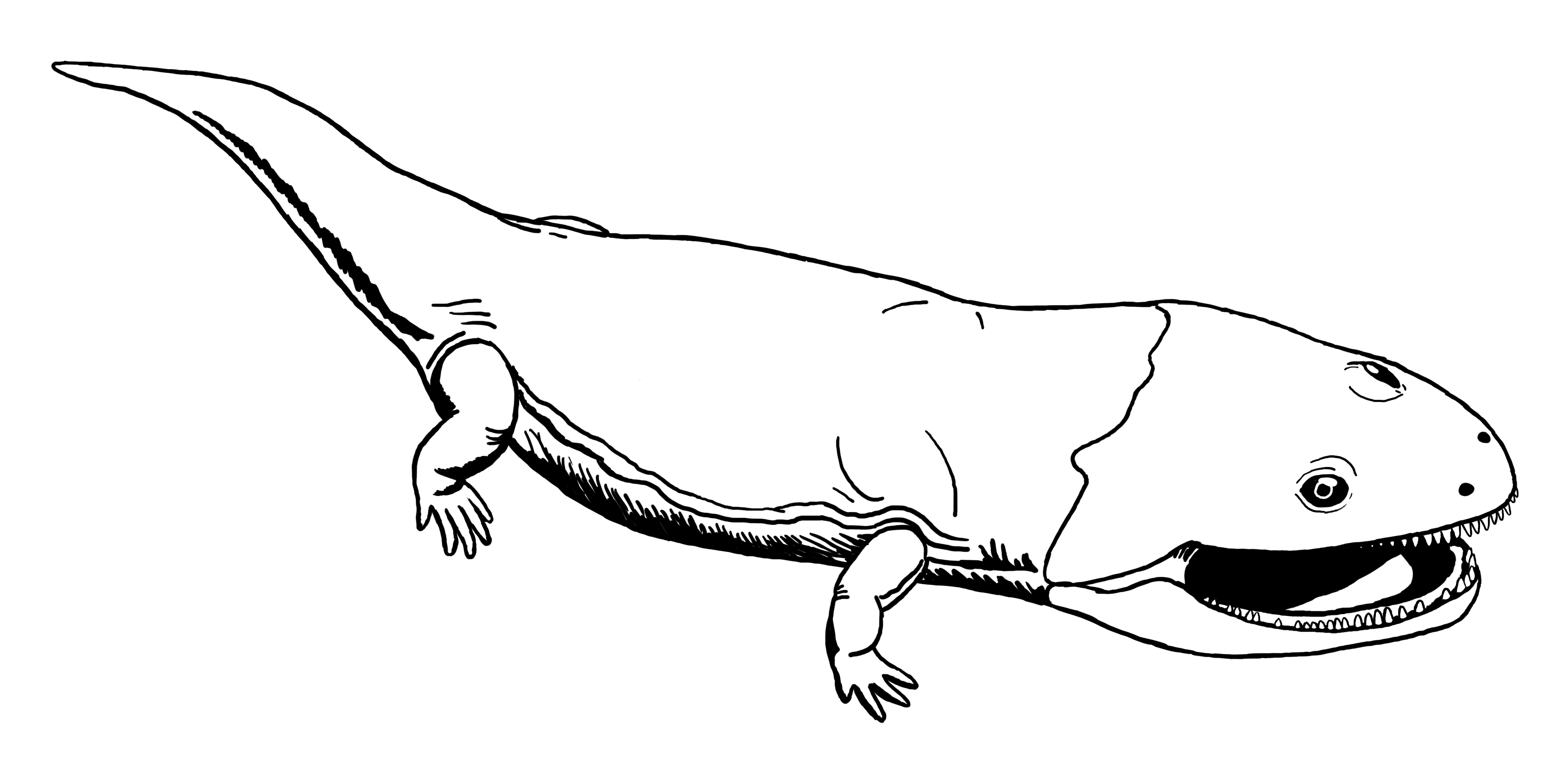
- Restoration of Arcadia myriadens

Scientific classification
- Kingdom: Animalia
- Phylum: Chordata
- Clade: Tetrapoda
- Order: †Temnospondyli
- Suborder: †Stereospondyli
- Family: †Rhytidosteidae
- Genus: †Arcadia; Warren & Black, 1985
- Species: †A. myriadens

Binomial name
- †Arcadia myriadens Warren & Black, 1985

= Arcadia (genus) =

Arcadia Temporal range: Late Triassic (Carnian) ~236 Ma

Extinct genus of amphibians

Arcadia is an extinct genus of temnospondyl amphibian in the family Rhytidosteidae from the lowermost Carnian of the Late Triassic period. The remains were found in and named after the Arcadia Formation of Australia.

== History of study ==
The holotype of Arcadia myriadens (QMF 10121) was discovered by Gordon Sanson of Monash University at the Duckworth Creek locality in south-central Queensland, Australia. It was subsequently named by Warren & Black (1985), with the generic epithet derived from the Arcadia Formation and the species epithet derived from the Greek myrios ('many') and dens ('teeth'). The holotype is a partial skull with associated hemimandibles and fragmentary postcrania.

Warren & Hutchinson (1990) provisionally referred a small rhytidosteid skull (QMF 12293) to A. myriadens as a putative juvenile, but this was restudied by Yates (2000), who subsequently designated it as the holotype of the rhytidosteid Nanolania anatopretia. Although Dias-da-Silva & Marsicano (2011) list QMF 12293 as a referred specimen of A. myriadens, they also list it as the holotype of N. anatopretia, and the validity of the latter has not been questioned by other workers. The holotype of A. myriadens is thus considered the only specimen currently known for the taxon.

== Anatomy ==
The skull of A. myriadens is wider than it is long and with laterally situated orbits. The dorsal roof of the skull is mostly flat before curving downwards in the temporal region. Prominent tabular horns project posteriorly to frame an otic notch. Warren & Black (1985) diagnosed the taxon by a combination of features, including: (1) a skull broader than long; (2) orbits situated in the anterior half of the skull; (3) a tripartite postcondylar region of the hemimandible; (4) large or compound pits near the center of some dermal bones; (5) lateral intrusions of the anterior palatal vacuity; (6) and tabular horns that are posteriorly directed, broad at the base, widely separated, and symmetrical across the longitudinal axis.

The postcranial remains associated with the holotype mainly comprise neural arches and intercentra. Rib fragments were deemed too incomplete to merit description, as were a left tibia and a partial left fibula.

== Phylogenetic relationships ==
The analyses of Rhytidosteidae by Dias-da-Silva & Marsicano (2011) typically recovered Arcadia as closely related to other Australian rhytidosteids like Rewana and Derwentia.

== See also ==
- Prehistoric amphibian
- List of prehistoric amphibians
