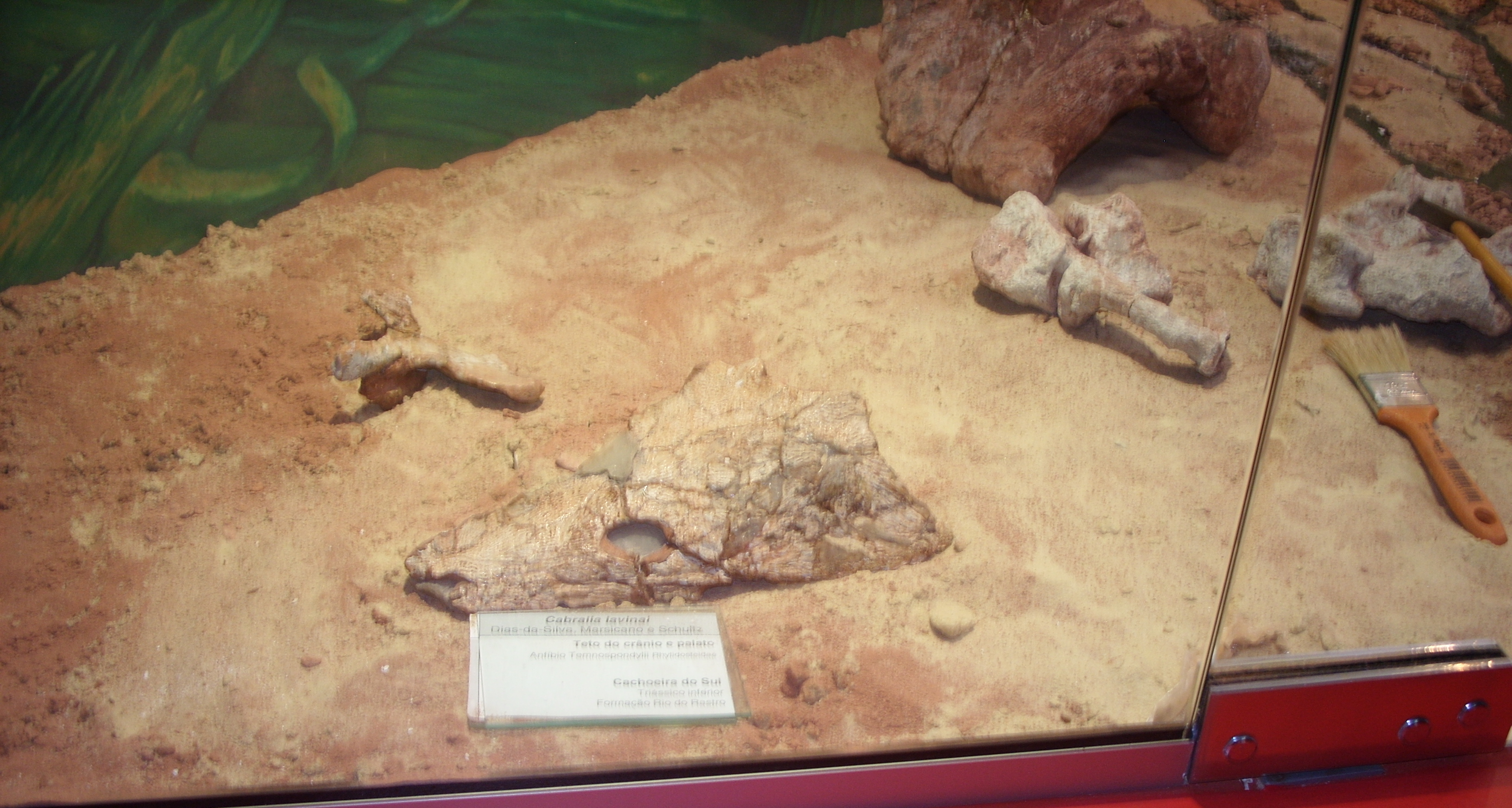
- Sangaia lavinai, at Museum of Geological History of Rio Grande do Sul, found in Rota Paleontológica

Scientific classification
- Domain: Eukaryota
- Kingdom: Animalia
- Phylum: Chordata
- Order: †Temnospondyli
- Suborder: †Stereospondyli
- Family: †Rhytidosteidae
- Genus: †Sangaia; Dias-da-Silva & Marsicano, 2006

Species
- S. lavinai (Dias-da-Silva et al., 2006) (type)

Synonyms
- Cabralia lavinai Dias-da-Silva et al., 2006

= Sangaia =

Sangaia Temporal range: Early Triassic ~252.3–247.2 Ma

Extinct genus of amphibians

Sangaia is an extinct genus of rhytidosteid temnospondyl from the early Triassic period of Rio Grande do Sul, Brazil. It is known from the holotype UMVT 4302, the left half of a partial skull, a partial palate, from the paratype UMVT 4303, a partial right palatal fragment and from the referred specimens PV 0497 T and MCN PV 2606, skull fragments, recovered from the Sanga do Cabral Formation in the Rośario do Sul Group.

== Taxonomy ==
This taxon originally was named Cabralia lavinai by Sérgio Dias-da-Silva, Claudia Marsicano and Cesar Leandro Schultz in 2006 but this name was preoccupied by the Brazilian moth Cabralia (Moore, 1882). Thus, Dias-da-Silva and Marsicano proposed Sangaia as a replacement generic name later in 2006.
