= Pneumatostega =

Pneumatostega Temporal range: Early Triassic

Scientific classification
- Domain: Eukaryota
- Kingdom: Animalia
- Phylum: Chordata
- Order: †Temnospondyli
- Suborder: †Stereospondyli
- Family: †Rhytidosteidae
- Genus: †Pneumatostega; Cosgriff & Zawiskie, 1979

Species
- P. potamia Cosgriff & Zawiskie, 1979 (type)

Extinct genus of amphibians

Pneumatostega is an extinct genus of rhytidosteid temnospondyl from the early Triassic period of Cape Province of South Africa. It is known from the holotype BPI F981, a dorsal mould of a skull roof and from the referred specimen SAM 11188, partial skull fragments and postcranial remains recovered from the Lystrosaurus Assemblage Zone in the Beaufort Group near Middelburg. This genus was named by J. W. Cosgriff and J. M. Zawiskie in 1979, and the type species is Pneumatostega potamia.
