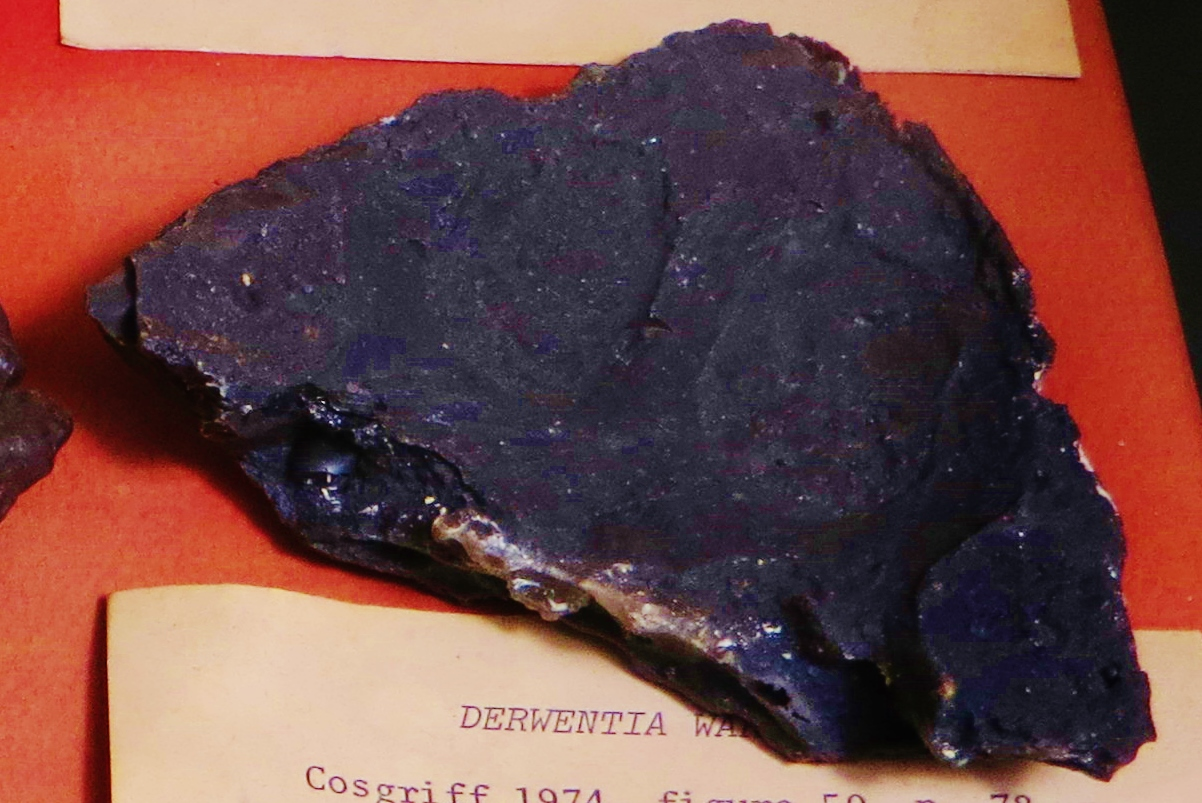
- Fossil

Scientific classification
- Kingdom: Animalia
- Phylum: Chordata
- Clade: Tetrapoda
- Order: †Temnospondyli
- Suborder: †Stereospondyli
- Family: †Rhytidosteidae
- Subfamily: †Derwentiinae
- Genus: †Derwentia; Cosgriff, 1974

Species
- D. warreni Cosgriff, 1974 (type)

= Derwentia (amphibian) =

Derwentia Temporal range: Early Triassic

Extinct genus of amphibians

Derwentia is an extinct genus of trematosaurian temnospondyl within the family Rhytidosteidae. It is known from a single skull found from the Knocklofty Sandstone of Tasmania, which is Early Triassic in age.

== See also ==
- Prehistoric amphibian
- List of prehistoric amphibians
