= Uruyiella =

Uruyiella Temporal range: Late Permian or Early Triassic

Scientific classification
- Kingdom: Animalia
- Phylum: Chordata
- Clade: Tetrapoda
- Order: †Temnospondyli
- Suborder: †Stereospondyli
- Family: †Laidleriidae
- Genus: †Uruyiella; Piñeiro et al., 2007

Type species
- †U. liminea Piñeiro et al., 2007

Extinct genus of amphibians

Uruyiella is an extinct genus of temnospondyl from the Late Permian to Early Triassic Buena Vista Formation of Uruguay. It was first named by Graciela Piñeiro, Claudia Marsicano, and Nora Lorenzo in 2007, from a partial skull; the type and only species is Uruyiella liminea.

== History of study ==
The holotype and only specimen of U. liminea was collected from conglomerates in the Buena Vista Formation in Cerro Largo County near Colonia Orozco. The generic epithet refers to Uruguay, and the species epithet is derived from the Latin limine ("boundary"), referring to the stratigraphic position of the specimen near the P-T boundary.

== Anatomy ==
The holotype is a fragment from the left side of the skull roof and palate. Piñeiro et al. (2007) diagnosed it by a unique combination of characters: (1) ornamentation consisting of ridges enclosing small depressions and joined at their intersection by a small tubercle; (2) orbits close to lateral skull margin; (3) elongate post-orbital cranial elements; (4) absence of tabular horn and otic notch; (5) palatine ramus of the pterygoid extending to the level of the posteriormost tooth on the palatine; (6) quadrate ramus of the pterygoid with moderately developed oblique ridge; (7) trough on the ventral surface of the quadratojugal, producing an 'overhang'; (8) absence of paraquadrate foramen; and (9) accessory paraquadrate foramen present and in the middle of the ventral quadratojugal trough.

== Relationships ==
Although Piñeiro et al. placed Uruyiella as the sister taxon to Laidleria within Laidleriidae, the validity/utility of Laidleriidae and the relationship between these two taxa, as well as other aspects of the topology of Piñeiro et al. (e.g., nesting of plagiosaurids within Dvinosauria), have not been supported by subsequent studies. Laidleria is considered a rhytidosteid in the most recent revision of the clade by Dias-da-Silva & Marsicano (2011), although the relationships of nominal rhytidosteids remains unresolved in larger taxon samples. Several studies have recovered Uruyiella outside of Stereospondyli under a definition in which Rhinesuchidae is the earliest diverging stereospondyl clade.
