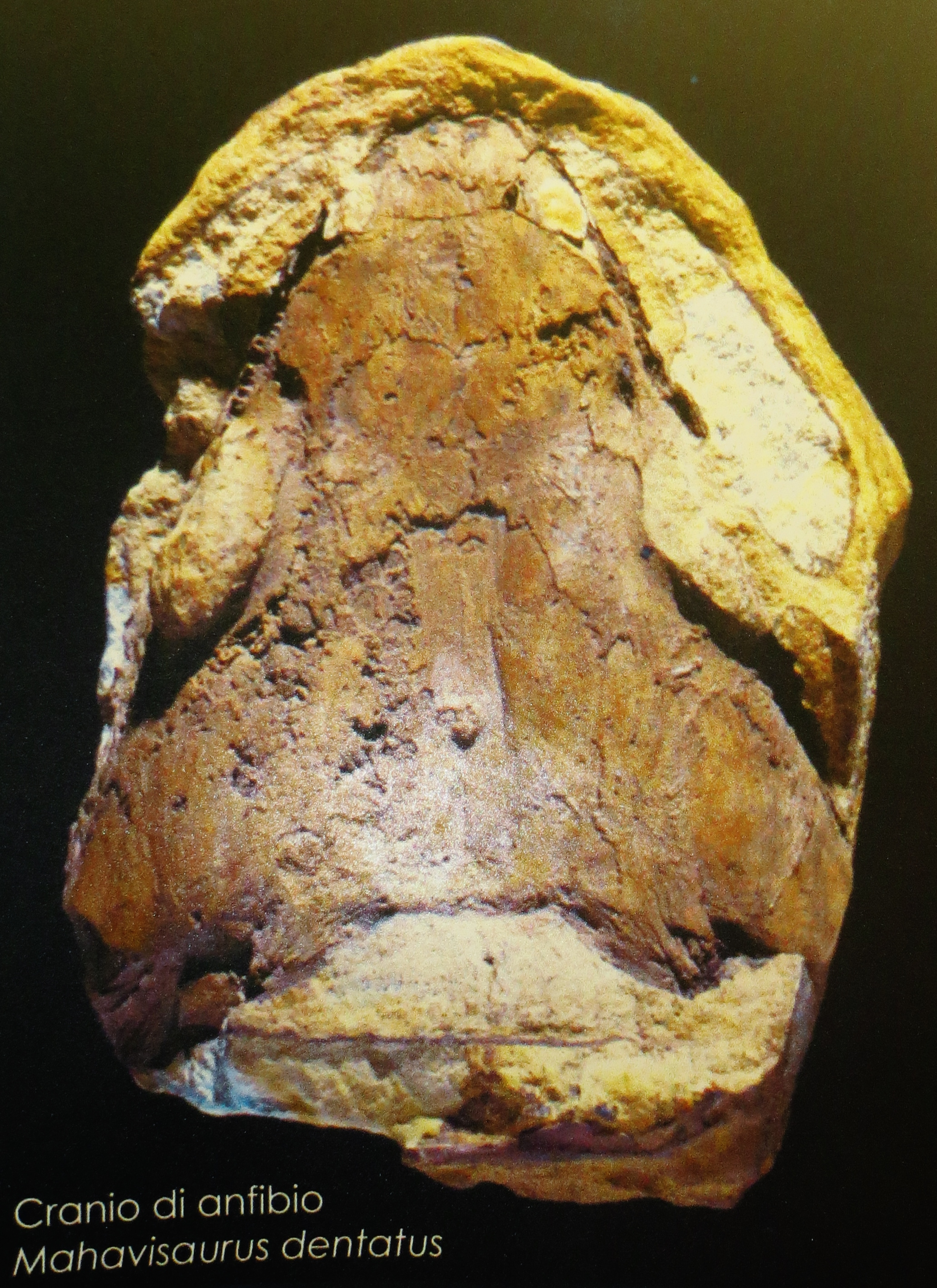
- Skull

Scientific classification
- Kingdom: Animalia
- Phylum: Chordata
- Clade: Tetrapoda
- Order: †Temnospondyli
- Suborder: †Stereospondyli
- Family: †Rhytidosteidae
- Genus: †Mahavisaurus; Lehman, 1966

Species
- M. dentatus Lehman, 1966 (type)

= Mahavisaurus =

Mahavisaurus Temporal range: Early Triassic, Induan

Extinct genus of amphibians

Mahavisaurus is an extinct genus of rhytidosteid temnospondyl from the early Triassic period (Induan stage) of Iraro, Madagascar. It is known from the holotype MNHN MAE 3037, a nearly complete skull, recovered from the Middle Sakamena Formation. This genus was named by J. P. Lehman in 1966, and the type species is Mahavisaurus dentatus.

== See also ==
- Prehistoric amphibian
- List of prehistoric amphibians
