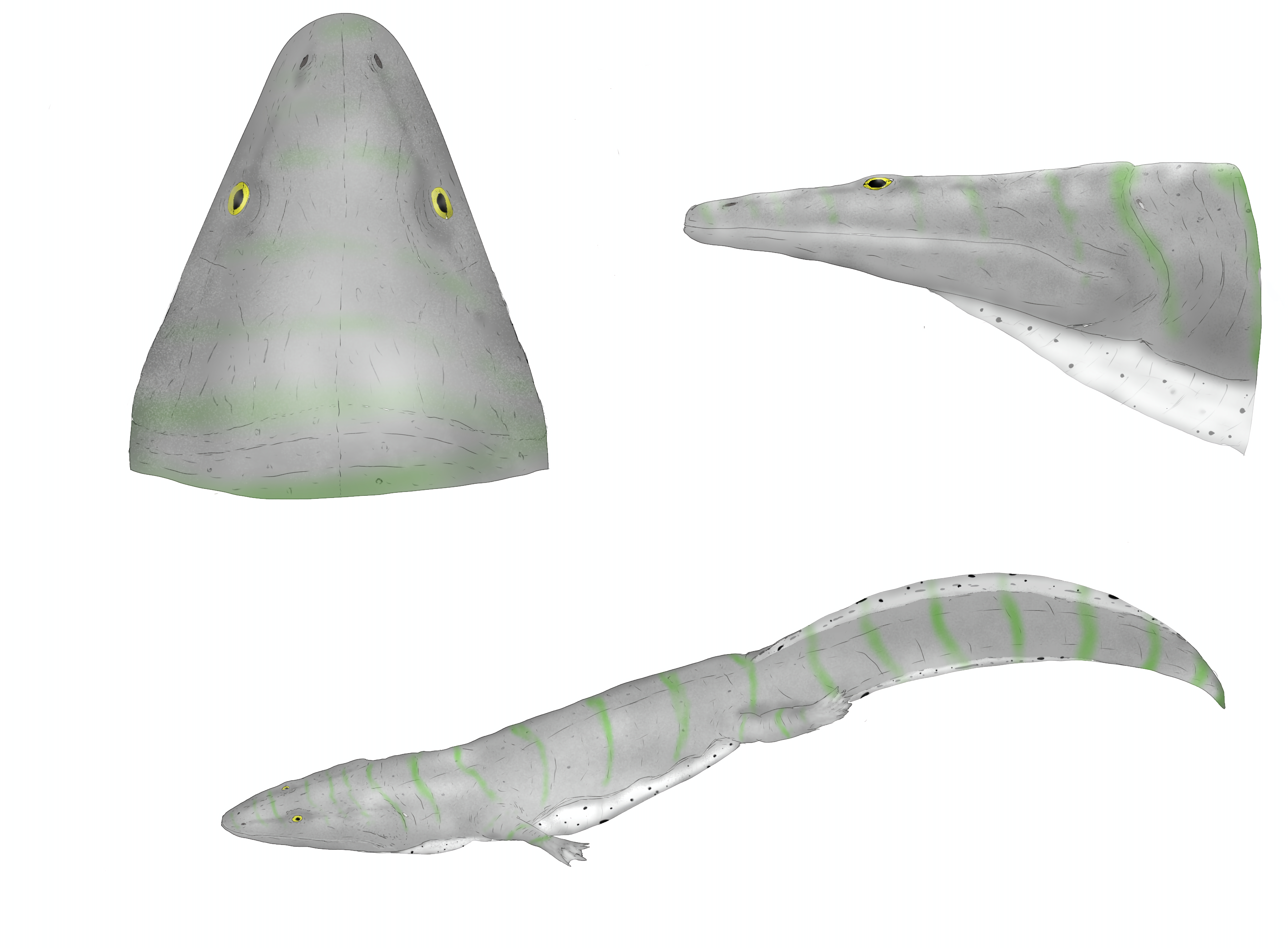

Scientific classification
- Kingdom: Animalia
- Phylum: Chordata
- Clade: Tetrapoda
- Order: †Temnospondyli
- Suborder: †Stereospondyli
- Genus: †Peltostega; Wiman, 1916
- Species: †P. erici

Binomial name
- †Peltostega erici Wiman, 1916

= Peltostega =

Peltostega Temporal range: Early Triassic ~251.3–247.2 Ma

Extinct genus of amphibians

Peltostega is an extinct genus of prehistoric trematosaurians. The type is the only known species, Peltostega erici. It is known from the Early Triassic Kongressfjellet Formation of Svalbard.

== See also ==
- Prehistoric amphibian
- List of prehistoric amphibians
