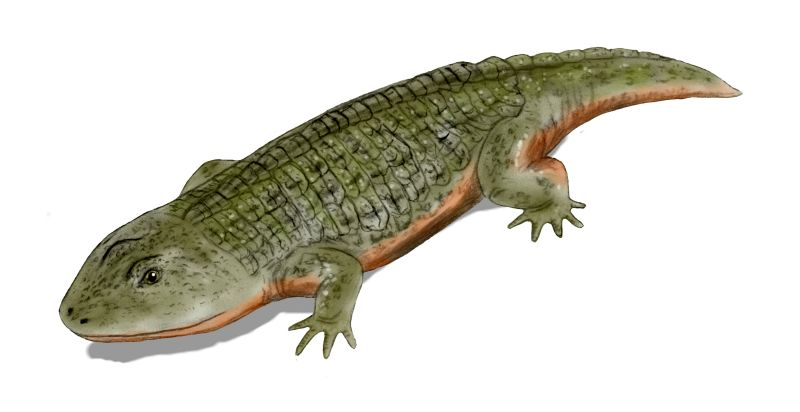
- Peltobatrachus pustulatus

Scientific classification
- Kingdom: Animalia
- Phylum: Chordata
- Clade: Tetrapoda
- Order: †Temnospondyli
- Suborder: †Stereospondyli
- Family: †Peltobatrachidae
- Genus: †Peltobatrachus; Panchen, 1959

= Peltobatrachus =

Peltobatrachus Temporal range: Lopingian, 259–253 Ma

Extinct genus of temnospondyls

Peltobatrachus (from Greek pelte, meaning shield and batrakhos, meaning frog) is an extinct genus of temnospondyl amphibian from the upper Permian Usili Formation of Tanzania. The sole species, Peltobatrachus pustulatus, is also the sole member of the family Peltobatrachidae.

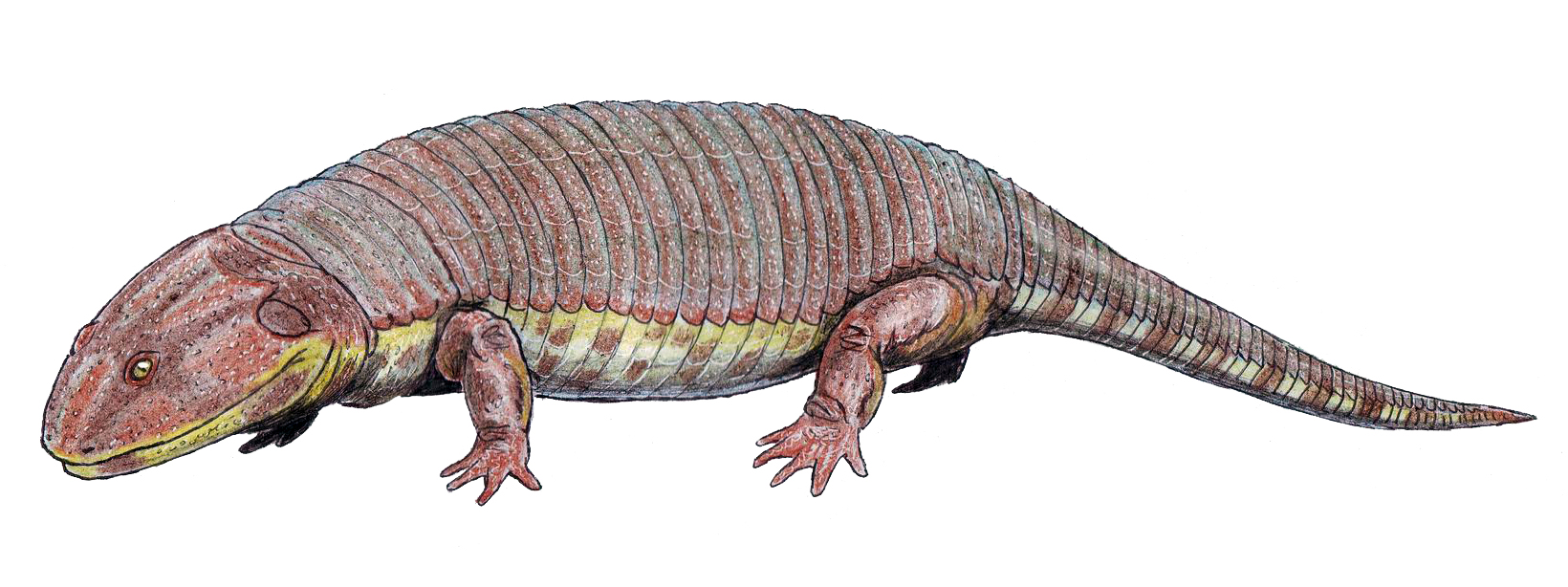
Life restoration of Peltobatrachus pustulatus.

== Description ==
Peltobatrachus was a large, slow moving animal, up to 70 centimetres (2.3 ft) in length. To protect itself against predators such as the large gorgonopsid therapsids, it had developed an armadillo-like armored plating covering its body and tail. The armor consisted of broad plates on the shoulders and hips and narrower plates on the rest of the body.
