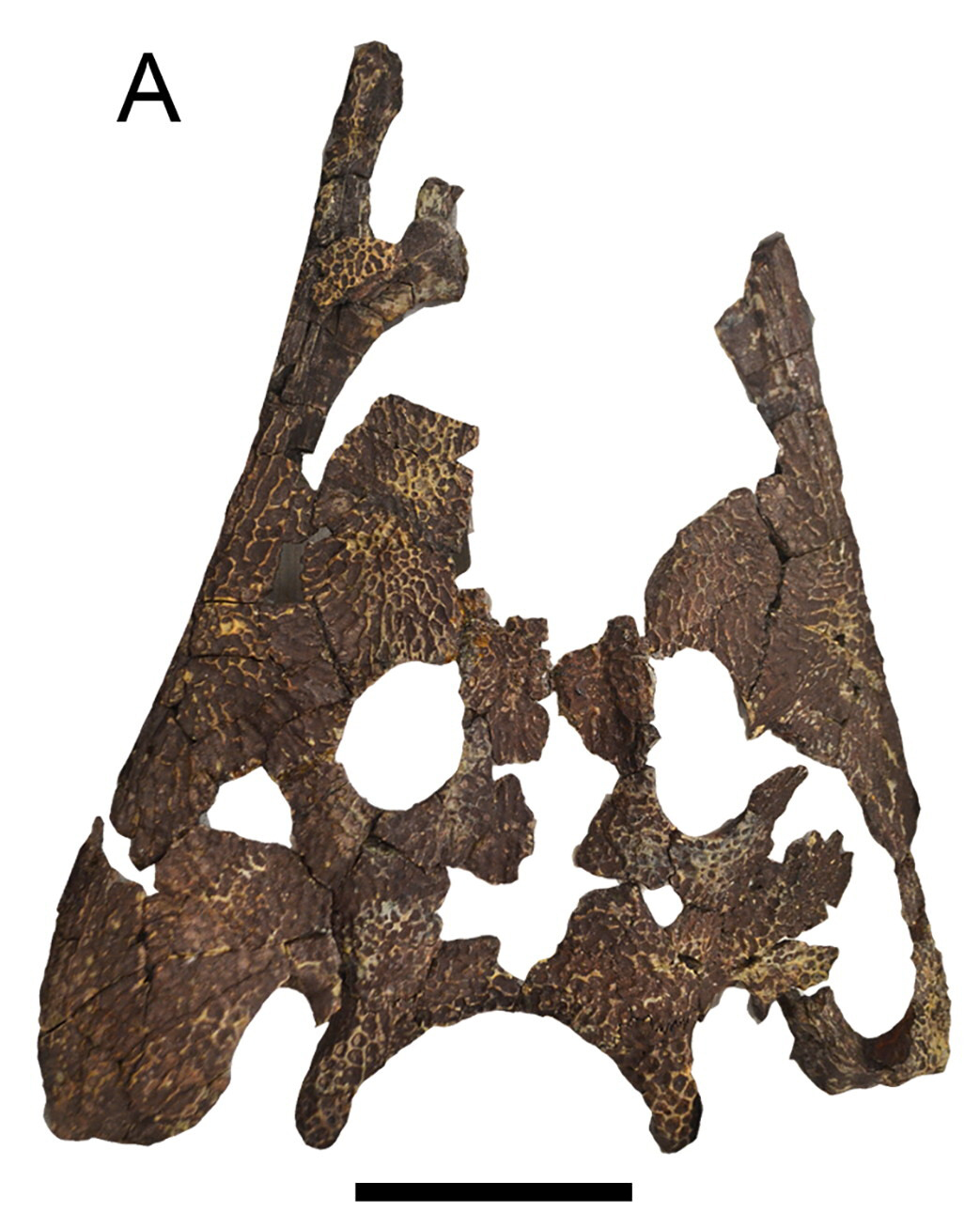
- Holotype skull of W. gunganj

Scientific classification
- Kingdom: Animalia
- Phylum: Chordata
- Clade: Tetrapoda
- Order: †Temnospondyli
- Suborder: †Stereospondyli
- Clade: †Capitosauria
- Genus: †Watsonisuchus; Ochev, 1966

Species
- †W. magnus (Watson, 1962) (type); †W. gunganj (Warren, 1980); †W. rewanensis (Warren, 1980)

Synonyms
- Rewanobatrachus Schoch and Milner, 2000; ?Warrenisuchus Maganuco et al., 2009

= Watsonisuchus =

Watsonisuchus Temporal range: Early–Mid Triassic

Extinct genus of temnospondyls

Watsonisuchus is an extinct genus of temnospondyl from the Early–Middle Triassic of Australia (The Crater, Arcadia Formation), Madagascar, and South Africa. It was up to 122 cm long and had a robust skull of 24 cm in length.

Three species are known: W. magnus (the type species), W. gunganj, and W. rewanensis.
