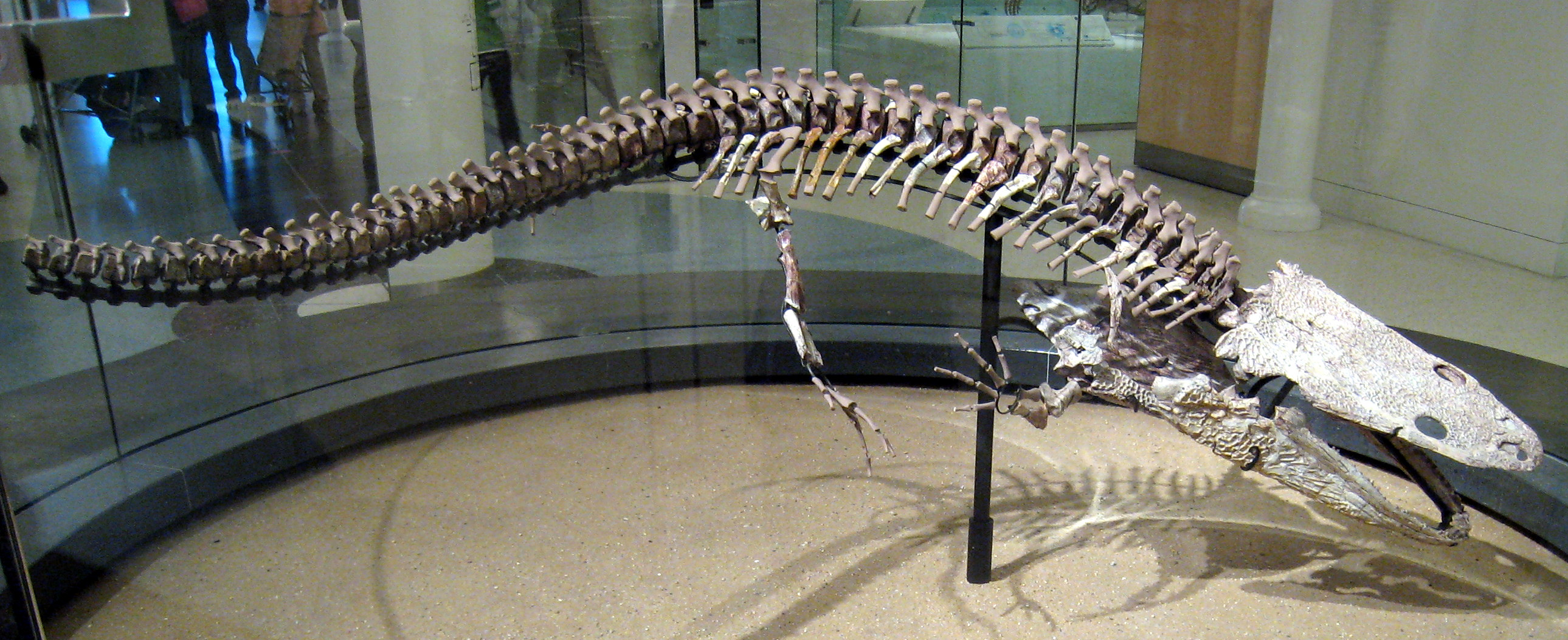
- Skeleton of Anaschisma in the American Museum of Natural History

Scientific classification
- Kingdom: Animalia
- Phylum: Chordata
- Clade: Tetrapoda
- Order: †Temnospondyli
- Suborder: †Stereospondyli
- Clade: †Trematosauria; Yates and Warren, 2000

Clades
- †Brachyopomorpha; †Metoposauroidea; †Plagiosauroidea; †Rhytidosteoidea; †Trematosauroidea

= Trematosauria =

Trematosauria Temporal range: Early Triassic - Early Cretaceous, 252.3–120 Ma

Extinct clade of amphibians

Trematosauria is one of two major groups of temnospondyl amphibians that survived the Permian-Triassic extinction event, the other (according to Yates and Warren 2000) being the Capitosauria. The trematosaurs were a diverse and important group that included many medium-sized to large forms that were semi-aquatic to fully aquatic. The group included long-snouted forms such as the trematosauroids and short, broad-headed forms such as the metoposaurs. Although most groups did not survive beyond the Triassic, one lineage, the brachyopoids, continued until the Cretaceous period. Trematosauria is defined as all stereospondyls more closely related to Trematosaurus than to Parotosuchus, a capitosaurian.

== Classification ==
=== Phylogeny ===
Cladogram after Yates and Warren (2000):

- Trematosauria
  - Trematosauroidea
  - - Metoposauroidea
    - - Plagiosauroidea
      - - Rhytidosteidae
        - - Brachyopidae
          - Chigutisauridae
