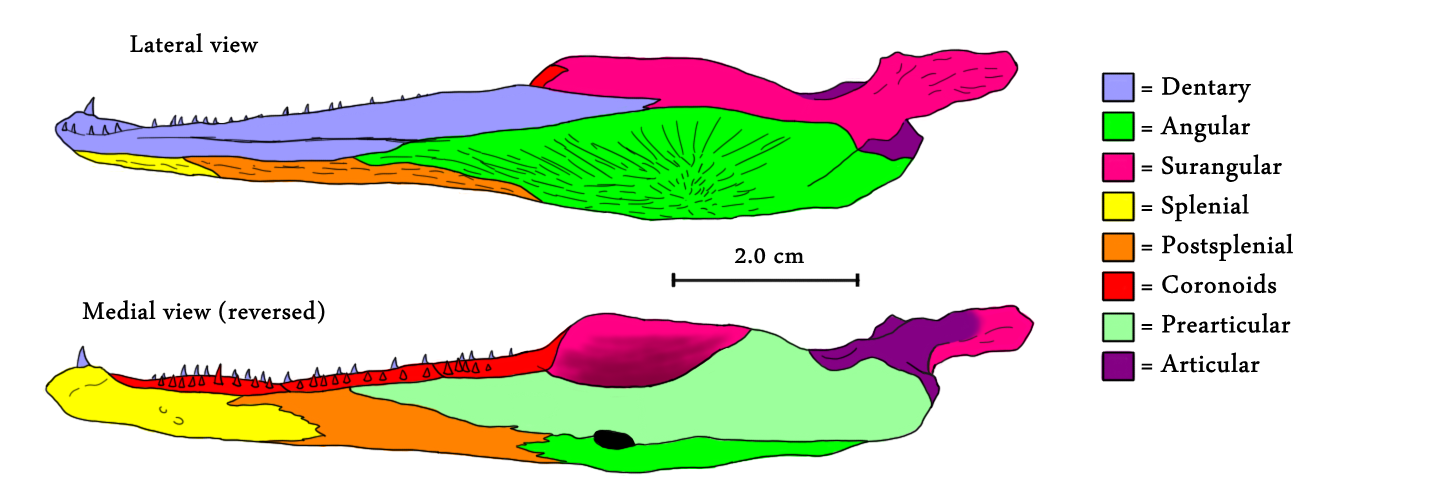
- The holotype jaw of Manubrantlia khaki in lateral and medial views

Scientific classification
- Kingdom: Animalia
- Phylum: Chordata
- Clade: Tetrapoda
- Order: †Temnospondyli
- Suborder: †Stereospondyli
- Family: †Lapillopsidae
- Genus: †Manubrantlia; Yates & Sengupta, 2002

Type species
- †Manubrantlia khaki Yates & Sengupta, 2002

= Manubrantlia =

Manubrantlia Temporal range: Lower Triassic

Extinct genus of temnospondyls

Manubrantlia was a genus of lapillopsid temnospondyls from the Early Triassic Panchet Formation of India. This genus is only known from a single holotype left jaw, given the designation ISI A 57. Despite the paucity of remains, the jaw is still identifiable as belonging to a relative of Lapillopsis. For example, all three of its coronoid bones possessed teeth, the articular bone is partially visible in lateral (outer) view, and its postsplenial does not contact the posterior meckelian foramen. However, the jaw also possesses certain unique features which justify the erection of a new genus separate from Lapillopsis. For example, the mandible is twice the size of any jaws referred to other lapillopsids. The most notable unique feature is an enlarged "pump-handle" shaped arcadian process at the back of the jaw. This structure is responsible for the generic name of this genus, as "Manubrantlia" translates from Latin to the English expression "pump-handle". The type and only known species of this genus is Manubrantlia khaki. The specific name refers to the greenish-brown mudstones of the Panchet Formation, with a color that had been described as "khaki" by the first British geologists who studied the formation.

Lapillopsids such as Lapillopsis and Manubrantlia are part of Temnospondyli, a diverse order of tetrapods which may include the ancestors of modern amphibians. Different authors disagree on the precise placement of Lapillopsids among temnospondyls. Some place them near or within dissorophoids, a group of terrestrial insectivorous temnospondyls. However, most other authors consider lapilopsids to be unusual stereospondyls. Stereospondyls are typically large and crocodilian-like Mesozoic temnospondyls with flattened skulls and semiaquatic habits, but lapillopsids differ from this body plan and more closely resemble the dissorophoids, at least superficially.

== Description ==
The mandible is approximately 11.15 centimeters (4.4 inches) long, about twice the size of that of Lapillopsis. This would have made Manubrantlia the largest lapillopsid by a wide margin. This has been construed as a primitive feature, as it falls more in line with the size of other temnospondyls rather than the derived minute size of more advanced lapillopsids.

Like other lapillopsids, Manubrantlia had two rows of teeth on each lower jaw. The teeth on the outer row, also known as "marginal teeth", are attached to the dentary bone and are sharp and curved. They are also slightly flattened in an anteroposterior (front-to-back) direction, although not to the extent seen in capitosaurs such as Mastodonsaurus. At the front of the jaw, the dentary tooth row also twists slightly outwards. The front of the jaw also possesses an enlarged tooth known as a parasymphyseal tusk, although this tooth is less than twice as wide as the rest of the marginal teeth. A deep longitudinal groove known as an oral sulcus is visible below the marginal tooth row.

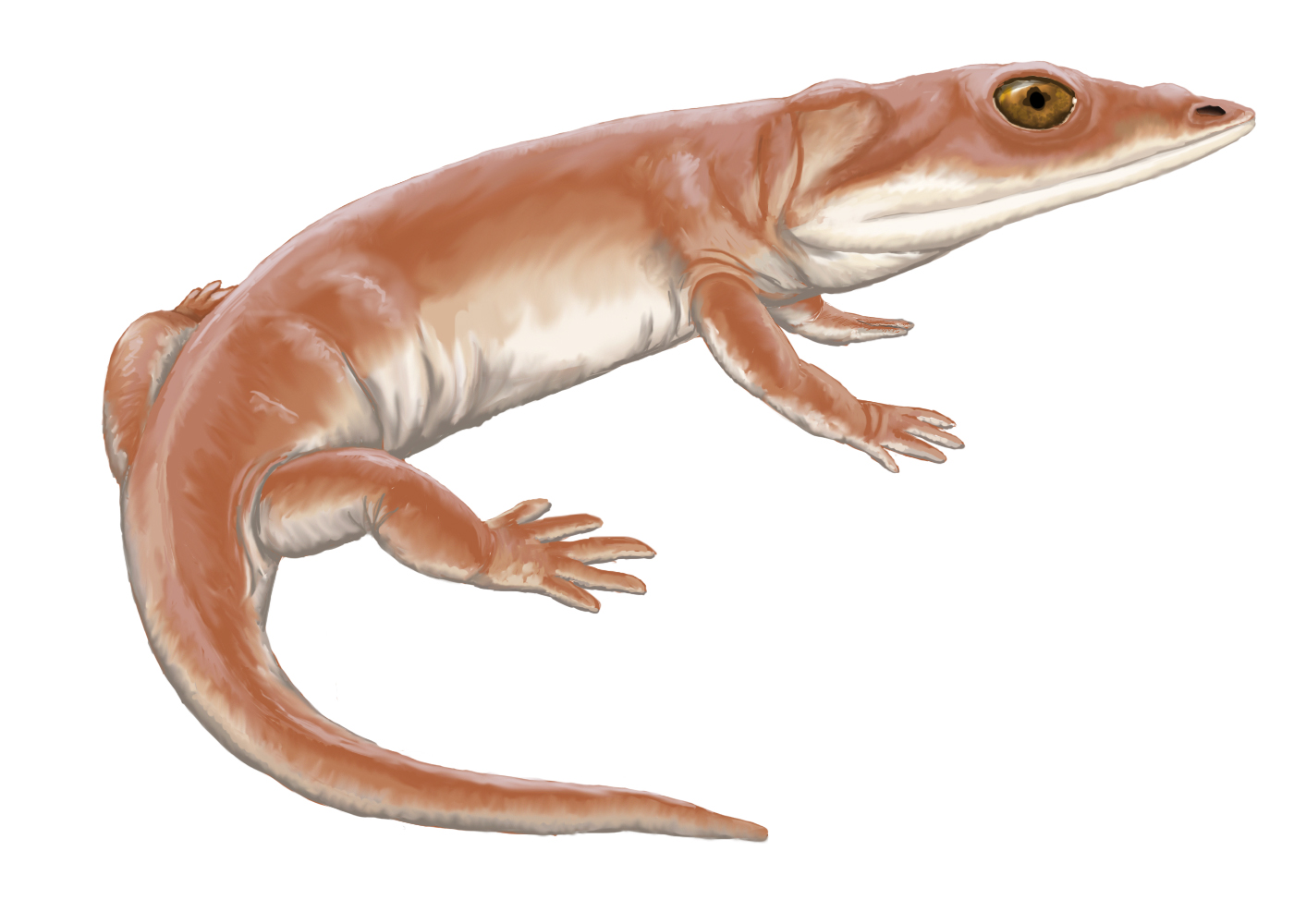
This genus, Lapillopsis, was closely related to Manubrantlia.

The inner row of conical teeth form out of the three coronoid bones which lie inwards from the dentary. This feature is practically unique to lapillopsids among early Triassic temnospondyls, as most other groups have much more reduced coronoid teeth. Lydekkerinids, for example, only have a patch of small denticles on the last coronoid. The only other stereospondyls with a continuous row of teeth on all three coronoid bones are the plagiosaurids. The last coronoid also extends outwards, and is visible from the outer side of the mandible just above the rear tip of the dentary.

When seen in lateral or labial view (a.k.a. from the outside), a large portion of the mandible is formed by the angular bone (at the back), with a thinner portion under the dentary formed by the splenial (at the front) and the postsplenial (at the middle). On the other hand, the splenial and postsplenial are much more exposed on the inner portion of the jaw (seen in lingual or medial view a.k.a. from the inside) while the angular is less so. Prominent ridges and grooves radiate from the middle of the angular bone (as seen from the outside of the jaw), similar to the condition in most temnospondyls but unlike other lapillopsids. A large portion of the inner part of the jaw is also formed by the prearticular bone in the rear half of the mandible. A hole known as the posterior meckelian foramen is also visible from the inner part of the jaw. Unlike with most temnospondyls but in common with Lapillopsis (and a few other taxa, such as archegosauroids and Eryops), this hole has no contact with the postsplenial, instead being surrounded solely by the prearticular and angular.

The most prominent and unique features of Manubrantlia lie at the rear part of the jaw, in the general area of the jaw joint. The jaw joint is formed by the articular bone, which is most visible in medial view but also wraps around to be visible in lateral view at the rear lower tip of the outer side of the bone. This lateral exposure of the articular is also known in Lapillopsis, and is believed to be unique to lapillopsids. The upper rear portion of the lateral face of the mandible is formed by the surangular bone. The rear tip of the surangular forms a bony projection known as an arcadian process. In most temnospondyls this projection is small and blunt, similar in size to the adjacent retroarticular process of the articular bone which is projects inwards and backwards. However, in Manubrantlia the arcadian process is enlarged greatly, turning into an elongated extension described as "resembling a pump-handle". The arcadian process of Lapillopsis is also elongated, although it is much more slender as well. The only other temnospondyls with arcadian processes near the size of Manubrantlia is the rhytidosteid Arcadia and lydekkerinids such as Lydekkerina. However, they also possess enlarged retroarticular processes, which contrasts with the condition in Manubrantlia. Thus, the large size of the arcadian process is believed to be an example of convergent evolution between lapillopsids and lydekkerinids, as many other factors separate the two families.

== Paleoecology ==
The fauna and flora of the Panchet Formation is practically identical to that of the South African Lystrosaurus assemblage zone of the Karoo supergroup. This biozone is dated to the very beginning of the Triassic period about 250 million years ago, when life was still recovering from the severity of the Permian-Triassic extinction event. It is assumed that the Panchet Formation, due to its similarities with the Lystrosaurus zone, had an equivalent age. At this time the continents would have been formed into one supercontinent known as Pangaea. The Indian tectonic plate was situated in the far southern hemisphere near South Africa at this point in time, as the plate tectonics which moved India towards its modern position in southern Asia had not yet activated. This proximity explains the similarity between the South African and Indian ecosystems.

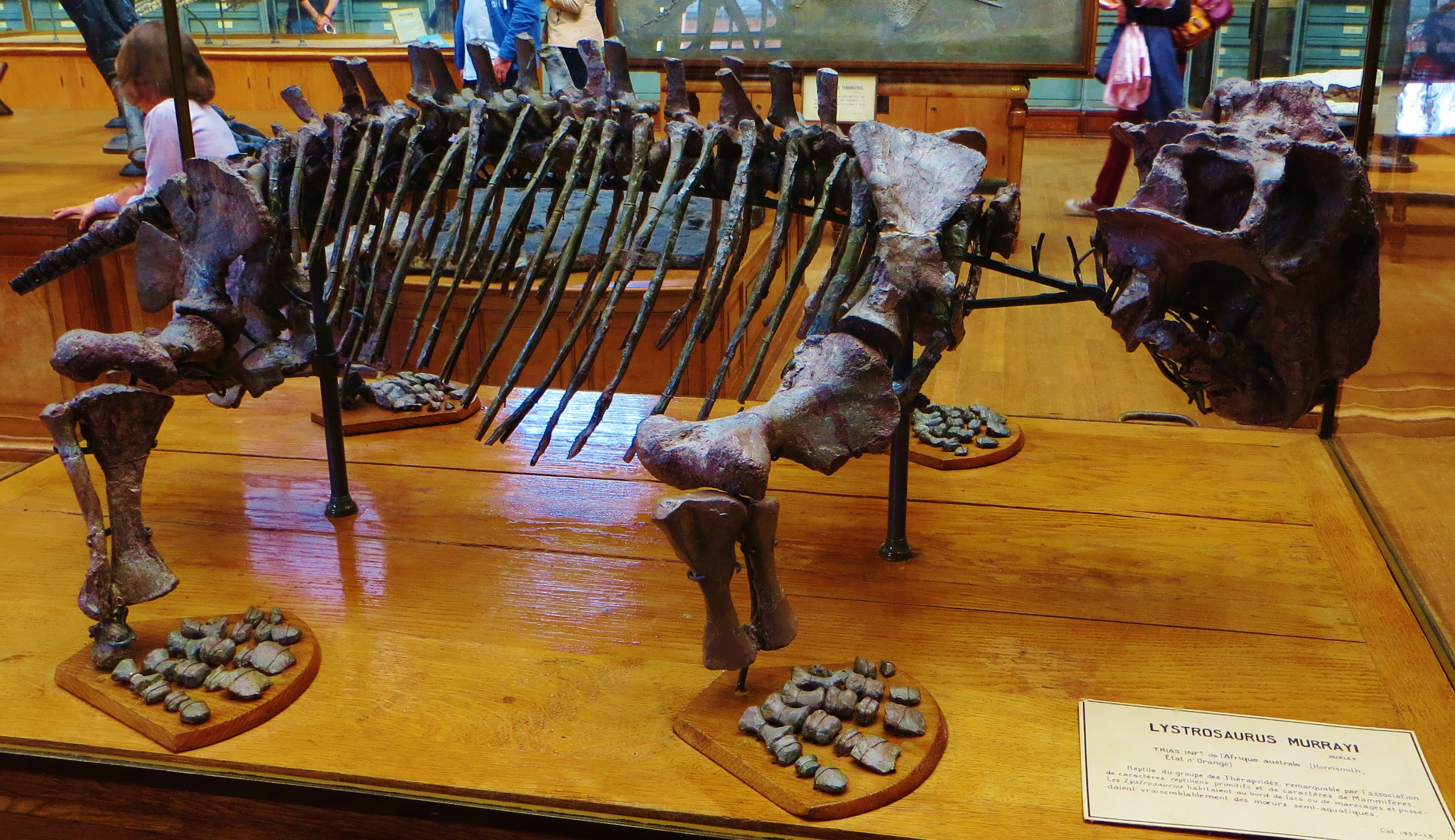
Lystrosaurus murrayi was one of the most common animals of the Panchet Formation.

The largest and most common animal within the Panchet Formation was the herbivorous dicynodont Lystrosaurus. Several different species of Lystrosaurus have been reported from this formation in the past, but a 2005 analysis concluded that they were all referable to only a single species: Lystrosaurus murrayi. More recently, Lystrosaurus declivis and a species close to Lystrosaurus curvatus have also been found in lower portions of the Formation. A genus of cynodont, Panchetocynodon, was also present in the formation. Fossils of Thrinaxodon, a cynodont common to the Karoo supergroup, have also been reported in the Panchet Formation, although these claims remain unsubstantiated. Other amniote remains are also known from the formation, including the dubious proterosuchid Ankistrodon (which may be synonymous with the South African Proterosuchus) and fragmentary procolophonid fossils.

Apart from Lystrosaurus, the most common animals in the Panchet Formation are a diverse assortment of stereospondyls, among them Manubrantlia. These include Indobenthosuchus (a lydekkerinid), Indobrachyops (a rhytidosteid), and various trematosaurids (Gonioglyptus, Panchetosaurus, Indolyrocephalus, Glyptognathus). Many species remain poorly described and may qualify as nomina dubia ("dubious names"). Some stereospondyls from the formation, such as Pachygonia, are diagnostic yet too aberrant to be placed into a specific family. Fish scales are also known from the formation. The basal stereospondyl Capulomala has also been found here.

Plant life includes remains of the seed ferns Glossopteris, Lepidopteris, and Dicroidium. However, no coal seams are present in this formation unlike the case in many other Permian and Triassic formations of India. The abundance of cryptogams (spore-bearing plants) suggests that India had a warm, humid climate during the early Triassic. However, many studies instead suggest that the climate was arid.

Geological analyses have indicated that the sandstones and mudstones of the Panchet Formation were mainly formed in a fluvial environment, meaning that the formation was dominated by large rivers during the time of Manubrantlia. Some sand grains recovered from Panchet sandstones preserve the geological signatures of complex interactions between water and sand. These interactions include the formation of natural levees, tidal inlets, and beaches dominated by sand dunes. This indicates that large lakes were also present in the environment. Earthquakes also affected the area as shown by deformation in some sediments.
