= Rotaurisaurus =

Rotaurisaurus Temporal range: Early Triassic, Induan–Olenekian

Scientific classification
- Kingdom: Animalia
- Phylum: Chordata
- Clade: Tetrapoda
- Order: †Temnospondyli
- Suborder: †Stereospondyli
- Family: †Lapillopsidae
- Genus: †Rotaurisaurus; Yates, 1999

Type species
- †Rotaurisaurus contundo Yates, 1999

Extinct genus of temnospondyls

Rotaurisaurus is an extinct genus of temnospondyls from the family Lapillopsidae. This genus is known only from an incomplete crushed skull and associated left jaw, together given the designation UTGD (University of Tasmania Geological Department) 87795. The generic name, Rotaurisaurus, is a combination of Latin words translating to "circle-eared lizard". This references the shape of its otic notches, which acquire a circular form due to being partially enclosed by the tabular bones at the back of the skull. The specific name, contundo, references the specimen's poor level of preservation, as it is derived from the Latin word for "squashed".

The skull was discovered in 1960 at the Crisp and Gunn Quarry near Hobart, Tasmania. This quarry contains rock layers from the Knocklofty Formation, which is dated to the early Triassic Period. For years this skull was believed to belong to a juvenile individual of Chomatobatrachus halei, a species of lydekkerinid common in Tasmanian quarries. It was listed as such during John Cosgriff's 1974 review of Tasmanian temnospondyls. The Rotaurisaurus specimen was contained in a collapsed block of red siltstone which originally overlaid the grey siltstone of the formation's Poets Road Member. The Poets Road Member contained such fossils as a skeleton of the early archosaur relative Tasmaniosaurus triassicus, and is believed to hail between the Early Induan and Early Olenekian ages of the early Triassic, about 250 million years ago.

In 1999, Adam Yates established that the skull represented a new genus and species distinct from Chomatobatrachus. He allied it with the enigmatic Australian temnospondyl Lapillopsis, and formulated a new family (Lapillopsidae) to contain the two genera. Rotaurisaurus possessed unusually shaped tabular bones, which typically formed triangular horn-like structures along the rear edge of the skull. In Rotaurisaurus, these bones bent outwards to enclose the adjacent otic notches at the back of the head. Other unique features include the presence of a longitudinal ridge on the outer surface of each quadratojugal bone (which was situated near the skull joint), and a raised rim of bone behind the orbits (eye holes).

== See also ==
- Prehistoric amphibian
- List of prehistoric amphibians
