= Arcadia Formation, Australia =

Geological formation in Australia

Arcadia Formation
- Stratigraphic range: Mid–Late Triassic (Ladinian–Carnian) 239–233 Ma
- Type: Geological formation
- Unit of: Rewan Group
- Underlies: unconformity with Glenidal Formation
- Overlies: Sagittarius Sandstone
- Thickness: Several hundred meters

Lithology
- Primary: Red mudstone, siltstone, fine-grained sandstone

Location
- Coordinates: 25.055433°S 148.409404°E (The Crater)
- Region: Queensland
- Country: Australia
- Extent: Northern Bowen Basin
- Arcadia Formation, Australia (Australia) Arcadia Formation, Australia (Queensland)

The Arcadia Formation is a geological formation located within the northern part of the Bowen Basin of central-eastern Queensland, Australia, south of the small town of Rolleston. It is most well known for its abundance of Mid–Late Triassic aged fossils, most notably its high diversity of amphibians. The Arcadia Formation is one of two Rewan Group units, overlying the other unit, the Sagittarius Sandstone, and unconformably underlying the Glenidal Formation.

== Deposition & stratigraphy ==
The Arcadia Formation, which measures several hundred meters in thickness, is a succession of fluvial and overbank deposits which grade upwards into red-bed floodplain facies. Alongside the Sagittarius Sandstone, the only other unit in the Rewan Group, these formations were deposited within a fluvial-lacustrine environment across the foreland basin. It is a sequence of sandstones and mudstones deposited as a result of freshwater rivers and lakes during the Ladinian–Carnian ages of the Mid-Late Triassic period, between 239 and 233 million years ago. The formation is mostly unfossiliferous, but there are two primary exceptions: The Crater (QML78) and Duckworth Creek (QML215). These two sites have maximum depositional ages of about 239 million years (The Crater) and 236 million years (Duckworth Creek), respectively.

== Paleobiota ==
Currently, the formation's fauna is known to consist of temnospondyls, fish, reptiles and dicynodonts. There is also a high abundance of coprolites.

=== Fishes ===
Fishes of the Arcadia Formation
Genus	Species	Clade	Images
Aphelodus	A. anapes	Dipnoi, Sagenodontidae	
Namatozodia	N. pitikanta	Ceratodontiformes, Gnathorhizidae	
Ptychoceratodus	P. philippsi	Dipnoi, Ptychoceratodontidae	Fossils of P. serratus.
Saurichthys	cf. S. gigas	Saurichthyiformes, Saurichthyidae	

=== Reptiles ===
Reptiles of the Arcadia Formation
Genus	Species	Clade	Images
Eomurruna	E. yurrgensis	Procolophonia, Procolophonidae	Holotype of Eomurruna yurrgensis.
Kadimakara	K. australiensis	Archosauromorpha, Prolacertidae	Skull fragments of K. australiensis.
Kalisuchus	K. rewanensis	Archosauriformes, incertae sedis	Maxilla fragments of K. rewanensis.
Kudnu	K. mackinlayi	Neodiapsida, incertae sedis	Skulls of K. mackinlayi.

=== Synapsids ===
Synapsids of the Arcadia Formation
Genus	Species	Clade	Images
Dicynodontia	Indeterminate	Dicynodontia, ?Kannemeyeriformes	

=== Temnospondyls ===
Temnospondyls of the Arcadia Formation
Genus	Species	Clade	Images
Acerastea	A. wadeae	Temnospondyli, Rhytidosteidae	
Arcadia	A. myriadens	Temnospondyli, Rhytidosteidae	Restoration of A. myriadens.
Capulomala	C. arcadiaensis	Temnospondyli, Plagiosauridae	
Keratobrachyops	K. australis	Temnospondyli, Brachyopomorpha	Holotype skull of K. australis.
Lapillopsis	L. nana	Temnospondyli, Lapillopsidae	L. nana restoration.
Nanolania	N. anatopretia	Temnospondyli, Rhytidosteidae	Restoration of N. anatopretia.
Plagiobatrachus	P. australis	Temnospondyli, Plagiosauridae	
Rewana	R. quadricuneata	Temnospondyli, Rhytidosteidae	Holotype skull of R. quadricuneata.
Tirraturhinus	T. smisseni	Temnospondyli, Trematosauridae	Holotype skull of T. smisseni.
Warrenisuchus	W. aliciae (Formerly Parotosuchus aliciae)	Temnospondyli, Capitosauria	Warrenisuchus ontogenesis.
Watsonisuchus	W. gunganj (Formerly Parotosuchus gunganj)	Temnospondyli, Capitosauria	Holotype skull of W. gunganj.
Watsonisuchus	W. rewanensis (Formerly Parotosuchus rewanensis)	Temnospondyli, Capitosauria	Holotype skull of W. gunganj.
Xenobrachyops	X. allos (Formerly Brachyops allos)	Temnospondyli, Brachyopidae	Holotype skull of X. allos.
Trematosauridae	Incertae sedis	Temnospondyli, Trematosauridae	
