= Knocklofty Formation =

Geologic formation in Tasmania, Australia

- Stratigraphic range: Early Triassic (Induan), 251.902–249.9 Ma
- Type: Geological formation
- Underlies: Feldspathic Sandstone, Jurassic dolerite
- Overlies: Cygnet Coal Measures

Lithology
- Primary: Shale, siltstone, sandstone
- Other: Conglomerate, quartz, clay

Location
- Coordinates: 42.9°S 147.3°E
- Approximate paleocoordinates: 82.4°S 61.3°E
- Region: Tasmania
- Country: Australia

Type section
- Year defined: 1966
- Knocklofty Formation (Australia) Knocklofty Formation (Tasmania)

The Knocklofty Formation is an Early Triassic (Induan) geologic formation from central and southeastern Tasmania, Australia. It was deposited in a terrestrial, freshwater environment, and is primarily composed of shale and sandstone.

== Deposition, geology & palaeoenvironment ==
The Knocklofty Formation is suggested to have been deposited in the center area of a terrestrial basin which spanned a large portion of what is now Tasmania during the Early Triassic. Notably, not a single full section of the formation anywhere on the island is exposed. As none of the localities have their lower contact point recorded, it isn't certainly known what unit underlies the Knocklofty Formation, but it is most likely the upper Permian Cygnet Coal Measures. However, the upper contact has been documented, and the unit either underlies the Feldspathic Sandstone, or a massive Jurassic dolerite.

The best exposures are located in brick-clay quarries, most notably the type section Crisp and Gunn Quarry, where the fossils of Rotaurisaurus and Tasmaniosaurus were described from. This section is approximately 180 metres (590 ft) thick. Like the other localities, it too lacks the lower contact, but it extends to the dolerite near the top of Mount Knocklofty.

The Mount Knocklofty section showcases that the unit consists of a tripartite of members:

- Upper: Made of sandstone, measures, 50–55 metres (164–180 ft) thick.
- Middle: Lithology is very diverse, 40–45 metres (131–148 ft) thick
- Lower: Also composed of sandstone, at least 90 metres (300 ft) thick

The upper and lower members are composed primarily of usually gray, large sandstone strata with occasional beds of siltstone, quartz-pebble and clay-pebble conglomerate. The middle unit has these as subordinate rock layers of the predominant shales and siltstones, which are often black, brown, gray, green, purple and red in colouration. This member is also very lenticular, as are the upper and lower members on a larger scale.

The Knocklofty Formation was deposited via water action. The sandstone, shale and siltstone sediments appear to underwent deposition in a floodplain setting. Most of the shales and siltstones, primarily the gray and black forms, are most likely to be lake and pond deposits. The majority of conglomerate deposits and the less prominent shale lenses are the former beds of small rivers and streams which channeled into already deposited material. The vertebrate fauna, mostly temnospondyls, indicates that the prehistoric environment was at the very least temperate, warm enough to lack a noticeable winter season, and with enough humidity to sustain flowing and standing year round.

All localities of the formation that are not within the type section occur either within the middle, lithologically varied member, or the sandstone predominant lower member. As such, these seem to be correlated with the middle or lower members of Mount Knocklofty. However, due to a variety of issues, any further correlation based on lithology is impossible:

- All of the non-type localities are located in sequences of poor exposure, both on a lateral and vertical basis.
- The exposures are rather widely separated and quite rare, due to the abundant rainfall and resulting dense vegetation of Tasmania.
- The localities are either quarries, sea cliffs, steep hill slopes, or road cuts.
- The formation has been widely disrupted by block faulting.

However, several sedimentary units elsewhere across Tasmania are likely, if partially, laterally equivalent to the Knocklofty Formation. These are the Cluan, Gould, La Perouse, Ossa and Ross formations. In the case of the Cluan and Ross formations, based on lithological similarities, that the Ross Formation is roughly equivalent to the lower member of the Knocklofty, and the Cluan correlating to the middle and possibly the upper member of the Knocklofty.

== Paleobiota ==
=== Tetrapoda ===
Tetrapods of the Knocklofty Formation
| Genus | Species | Localities | Clade | Image |
|---|---|---|---|---|
| Banksiops (Formerly Blinasaurus) | B. townrowi | Crisp and Gunn Quarry; Conningham; Lime Bay; Midway Point; Old Beach | Temnospondyli, Brachyopidae | Life restoration of B. townrowi. |
| Chomatobatrachus | C. halei | Coningham; Crips and Gunn Quarry; Meadowbank Dam; Midway Point; Milford; Old Beach | Temnospondyli, Lydekkerinidae | |
| Deltasaurus | D. kimberleyensis | Conningham; Midway Point; Poatina Road | Temnospondyli, Rhytidosteidae | Life restoration of D. kimberleyensis. |
| Derwentia | D. warreni | Midway Point; Old Beach | Temnospondyli, Rhytidosteidae | |
| Rotaurisaurus | R. contundo | Crisp and Gunn Quarry | Temnospondyli, Lapillopsidae | |
| Tasmaniosaurus | T. triassicus | Crisp and Gunn Quarry | Archosauromorpha, Crocopoda incertae sedis | Tasmaniosaurus skeletal reconstruction. |

=== Fishes ===
Fishes of the Knocklofty Formation
| Genus | Species | Localities | Clade | Image |
|---|---|---|---|---|
| Acrolepis | A. hamiltoni | Cascade | Elonichthyiformes, Acrolepididae | Reconstruction of the related A. gigas. |
| Acrolepis | A. tasmanicus | Tinderbox Bay | Elonichthyiformes, Acrolepididae | Reconstruction of the related A. gigas. |
| Acrolepis | A. sp. | Old Beach | Elonichthyiformes, Acrolepididae | Reconstruction of the related A. gigas. |
| Ceratodus | C. gypsatus | Coningham; Midway Point; Old Beach | Ceratodontiformes, Ceratodontidae | Painting of a generalized Ceratodus. |
| Cleithrolepis | C. granulata | Coningham | Polzbergiiformes Cleithrolepididae | Fossil of C. altus (Sydney S.s.). |
| Saurichthys | S. sp. | Coningham | Saurichthyiformes, Saurichthyidae | The related Saurichthys seefeldensis attacking a hapless Preondactylus buffarinii. |
| Coelacanthidae indet. | sp. indet. | Midway Point | Coelacanthiformes, Coelacanthidae | |
| Osteichthyes indet. | sp. indet. | * Granton | Osteichthyes, incertae sedis | |
