= Panchet Formation =

Geological formation located in India

- Stratigraphic range: Early Triassic, Induan
- Type: Geological formation
- Underlies: Supra Panchet Formation
- Overlies: Raniganj Formation

Location
- Coordinates: 23.6°N 87.0°E
- Approximate paleocoordinates: 55.5°S 60.2°E
- Region: West Bengal, Jharkhand
- Country: India

The Panchet Formation is an Early Triassic geological formation from the Damodar Valley of India.

It is among the few geological formations outside of Russia, South Africa, and China that documents the recovery of global ecosystems immediately after the Permian-Triassic extinction. It shares similar traits to some of these other formations, including the dominance of Lystrosaurus and the primary predators being proterosuchid reptiles. It also preserves a diversity of temnospondyl amphibians.

== Palaeobiota ==
=== Synapsids ===
Genus	Species	Location	Stratigraphic position	Material	Notes	Images
Lystrosaurus	L. murrayi				A lystrosaurid dicynodont. Synonyms include L. orientalis and L. rajurkari.	Lystrosaurus_BW
Lystrosaurus	L. cf. curvatus				A lystrosaurid dicynodont.	
Lystrosaurus	L. cf. declivis				A lystrosaurid dicynodont.	
Panchetocynodon	P. damodarensis				A cynodont of uncertain affinity.	
Thrinaxodon	T. bengalensis				A thrinaxodontid cynodont.	Considered a nomen nudum. The specimen is lost.

=== Amphibians ===
Genus	Species	Location	Stratigraphic position	Material	Notes	Images
?Benthosuchidae indet.						
Capulomala	C. panchetensis				A plagiosaurid temnospondyl.	
Gonioglyptus	G. fragilis				A trematosaurid temnospondyl.	
Gonioglyptus	G. longirostris				A trematosaurid temnospondyl.	
Indobrachyops	I. panchetensis				A rhytidosteid temnospondyl.	
Indolyrocephalus	I. huxleyi				A trematosaurid.	
Lydekkerina	L. sp.				A lydekkerinid temnospondyl.	
Pachygonia	P. incurvata				Possibly a brachyopid temnospondyl.	
Manubrantlia	M. khaki				A lapillopsid temnospondyl	
Tupilakosaurus	T. sp				A tupilakosaurid temnospondyl.	

=== Reptiles ===
Genus	Species	Location	Stratigraphic position	Material	Notes	Images
Samsarasuchus	S. pamelae				A proterosuchid archosauriform.	
?"Teratosaurus"	T. bengalensis				A dubious archosauriform represented by a single tooth, formerly considered a rauisuchian but most likely a proterosuchid.	
Ankistrodon	A. indicus				Dubious proterosuchid.	
Neodiapsida indet.					A non-archosauromorph diapsid, known from an ilium.	

=== Fish ===
Genus	Species	Location	Stratigraphic position	Material	Notes	Images
Acrolepidae indet.					An acrolepid fish.	
Perleididae indet.					A perleidid fish.	
Chondrichthyes indet.					A cartilaginous fish.	
Ceratodontidae indet.					A ceratodontid lungfish.	

== See also ==
- Yerrapalli Formation - Middle Triassic (Anisian?) of the Pranhita–Godavari Basin
- Denwa Formation - Middle Triassic (Anisian?) of the Satpura Basin
- Tiki Formation - Late Triassic (Carnian?) of the Rewa Basin
- Lower Maleri Formation - Late Triassic (Carnian?) of the Pranhita–Godavari Basin
- Upper Maleri Formation - Late Triassic (Norian?) of the Pranhita–Godavari Basin
- Lower Dharmaram Formation - Late Triassic (Norian-Rhaetian?) of the Pranhita–Godavari Basin
