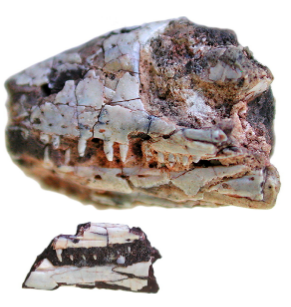
- Holotype skull QM F9181 (top) and referred skull QM F9182 (bottom)

Scientific classification
- Kingdom: Animalia
- Phylum: Chordata
- Class: Reptilia
- Clade: Neodiapsida
- Genus: †Kudnu; Bartholomai, 1979
- Species: †K. mackinlayi

Binomial name
- †Kudnu mackinlayi Bartholomai, 1979

= Kudnu =

Kudnu Temporal range: Middle Triassic (Ladinian) ~239 Ma

Extinct genus of reptiles

Kudnu is an extinct genus of neodiapsid reptile from the Mid–Late Triassic Arcadia Formation of Australia. The type species is K. mackinlayi.

== Discovery and naming ==
The holotype is QM F9181, an anterior section of a cranium with articulated dentary rami, and it was discovered in The Crater (L78), southwest of Rolleston, Queensland. The referred skull QM F9182 is also known.

Kudnu mackinlayi was named and described by Alan Bartholomai in 1979.

== Classification ==
Kudnu was initially classified within Paliguanidae by Bartholomai (1979). Benton (1985) classified Kudnu within Lepidosauromorpha, while Evans (2003) classified Kudnu within Prolacertiformes, and Evans & Jones (2010) later assigned Kudnu to the Procolophonidae. Ezcurra et al. 2022 preferred neodiapsid or saurian affinities for Kudnu, but did not suggest a more precise placement. This classification was followed by Poropat et al. (2023) in their review of Australian tetrapods from the Mesozoic.

== Paleoecology ==
Currently a high diversity of fauna has so far been recorded from the Arcadia Formation that lived alongside Kudnu. This includes a high diversity of temnospondyls, the archosauriform Kalisuchus rewanensis, the archosauromorph Kadimakara australiensis, the procolophonid Eomurruna yurrgensis as well as an indeterminate dicynodont.

There is also evidence of a diversity of different ichnotaxa based on coprolites.
