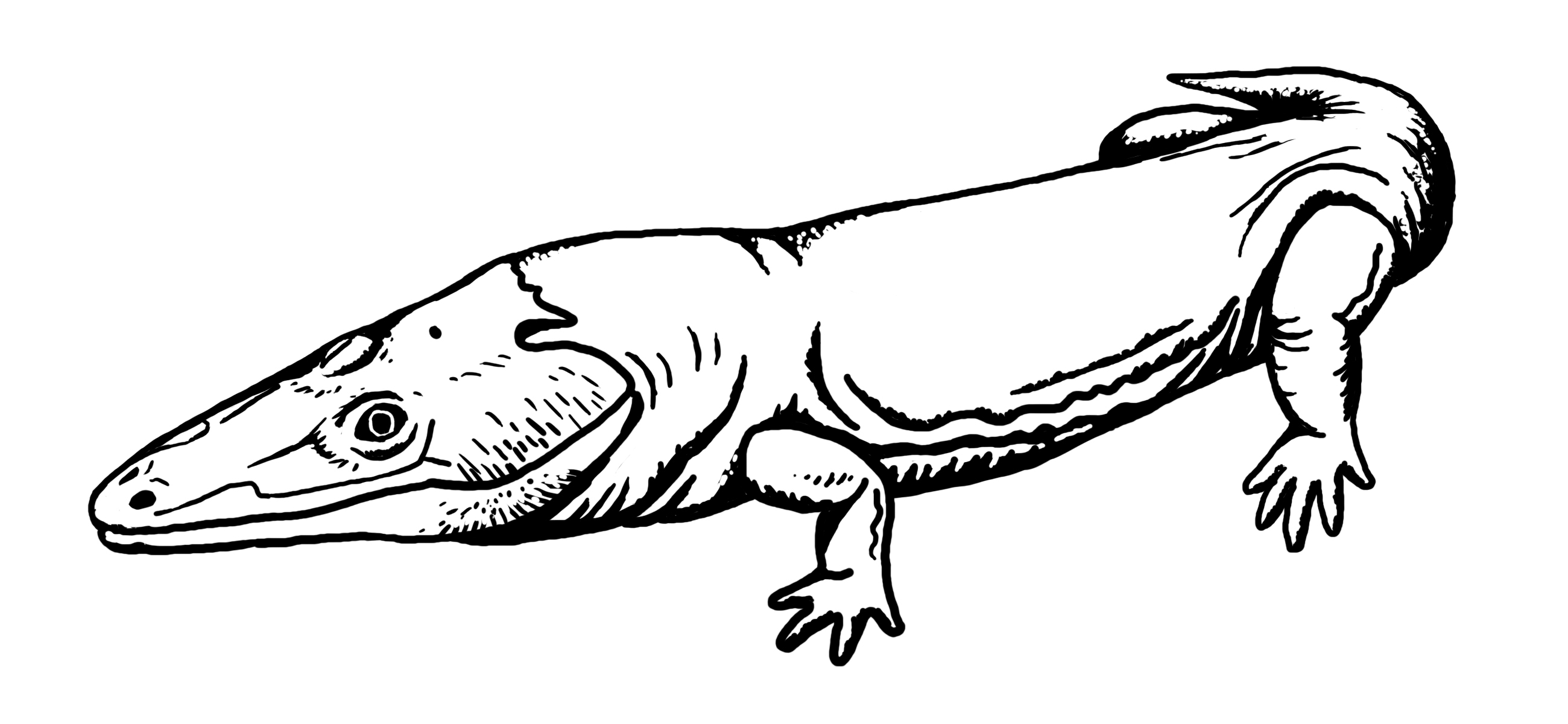
- Restoration of Eolydekkerina magna

Scientific classification
- Domain: Eukaryota
- Kingdom: Animalia
- Phylum: Chordata
- Order: †Temnospondyli
- Suborder: †Stereospondyli
- Family: †Lydekkerinidae
- Genus: †Eolydekkerina; Shishkin et al., 1996

Type species
- †Eolydekkerina magna Shishkin et al., 1996

= Eolydekkerina =

Eolydekkerina Temporal range: Early Triassic

Extinct genus of temnospondyls

Eolydekkerina is an extinct genus of temnospondyl from the Early Triassic of South Africa. It belongs to the family Lydekkerinidae, along with the closely related genus Lydekkerina. It is known from a single type species, Eolydekkerina magna, which was named in 1996 from a part of the Beaufort Group called the Lystrosaurus Assemblage Zone.

== Description ==
Eolydekkerina is known from two specimens: a skull lacking the lower jaws and a poorly lower jaw, not associated with the skull. At 13 centimetres (5.1 in) in length, the skull of Eolydekkerina is larger than that of any Lydekkerina specimen. The snout is proportionally much longer, and the eye sockets are placed farther apart than they are in Lydekkerina. The proportions of the skull in Eolydekkerina are similar to those of the Australian lydekkerinid genus Chomatobatrachus. However, Eolydekkerina shares more features in common with Lydekkerina, including the nearly identical shape of bones at the back of the skull. The skull is roughly triangular in shape when viewed from above, with straight side margins. The margins of the eye socket are raised and the middle of the snout is slightly indented. Shallow grooves run along the surface of the skull behind the eye sockets and below the nostril openings.

The lengthened skull of Eolydekkerina, while different from that of Lydekkerina, is similar to those of the related rhinesuchids and capitosaurians. The short skull of Lydekkerina is thought to be a derived or advanced characteristic, suggesting that Lydekkerina evolved from a more typical longer-skulled temnospondyl. Since temnospondyl skulls tend to lengthen as individuals of a species age, the skull of Lydekkerina may represent a juvenile form, while the skull of Eolydekkerina represents a fully-grown adult form. If Lydekkerina is the descendant of Eolydekkerina, it likely evolved by retaining juvenile characteristics into adulthood in a condition known as paedomorphosis.

== Paleoenvironment ==
Remains of Eolydekkerina were found in the lower part of the Lystrosaurus Assemblage Zone, a deposit that preserves very few amphibians. Amphibians become more numerous in younger parts of the Lystrosaurus Assemblage Zone with most specimens attributable to either Lydekkerina or to the dissorophoid Micropholis. Several species of the family Rhytidosteidae have also been identified from the upper part of the Lystrosaurus Assemblage Zone. When fossils of Eolydekkerina were first found, they were thought to belong to a rhytidosteid, as a rhytidosteid called Pneumatostega had already been found in this part of the assemblage zone.

The lower Lystrosaurus Assemblage Zone is dominated by the synapsid Lystrosaurus, as well as reptiles such as Owenetta and Proterosuchus. Most small-bodied lydekkerinids such as Lydekkerina are found in this type of assemblage. Lydekkerinids of similar size to Eolydekkerina (such as Chomatobatrachus) are usually found in amphibian-dominated assemblages where Lystrosaurus is not present. Therefore, the presence of Eolydekkerina in a reptile-dominated environment is unusual.
