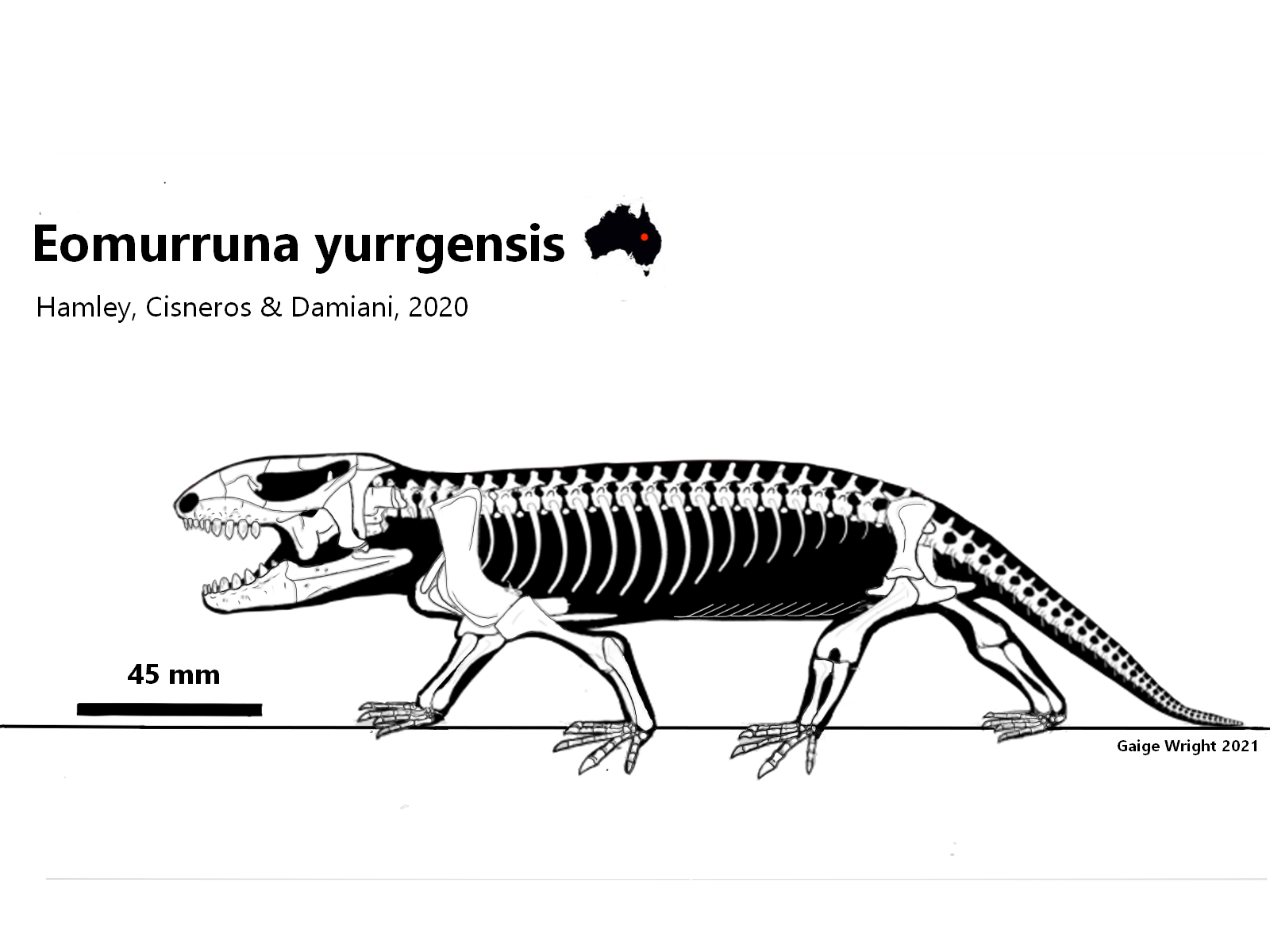
- Reconstructed skeletal diagram of Eomurruna yurrgensis

Scientific classification
- Kingdom: Animalia
- Phylum: Chordata
- Class: Reptilia
- Family: †Procolophonidae
- Subfamily: †Theledectinae
- Genus: †Eomurruna; Hamley, Cisneros & Damiani, 2020
- Species: †E. yurrgensis

Binomial name
- †Eomurruna yurrgensis Hamley, Cisneros & Damiani, 2020

= Eomurruna =

Eomurruna Temporal range: Mid–Late Triassic (Ladinian–Carnian) ~236–233 Ma

Extinct genus of reptiles

Eomurruna is a genus of procolophonid reptile that existed in what is now Queensland, Australia during the Middle to lowermost Late (Ladinian–Carnian) Triassic period (236–233 Mya). The genus is made up of a single species, Eomurruna yurrgensis, originally uncovered within the Arcadia Formation in 1985. Since then over 40 specimens have been referred to the genus, making Eomurruna one of the most complete organisms so far found from the Mesozoic of Australia.

== Discovery and naming ==
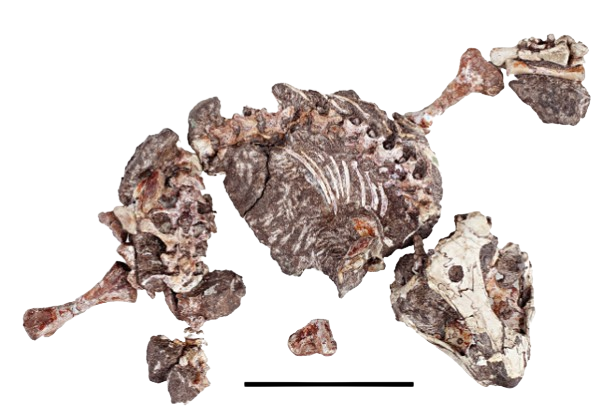
Holotype

Eomurruna was originally discovered on the basis of an articulated skeleton (QMF 59501), only missing various digits of each foot, gastralia as well as half of the tail. QMF 59501 was originally collected by Ruth Lane in 1985 within the Arcadia Formation. From here on more specimens would be referred to the genus; today there are over 40 specimens from both The Crater and Duckworth Creek localities that have been referred to the genus, making Eomurruna one of the most complete and well understood animals from Mesozoic of Australia. It wasn't until 35 years later that the genus would receive a proper scientific description and a name.

The generic name is a combination of the Ancient Greek ἠώς, eos, dawn, and murruna, the name of the extant shingleback skink in the Bidyara language of Queensland. The specific name is derived from the Bidyara yurrga, a hole within the Earth and the Latin suffix ensis meaning "of" or "belonging to" which is a reference to where the majority of specimens have been found.

== Description ==
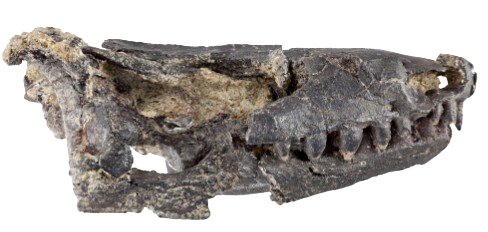
Referred skull

Eomurruna represents a small, lizard-like organism, only reaching a length of 175mm. It possessed a very short tail, a long flat body as well as enlarged bulbous teeth, a feature not often seen among procolophonids. Eomurruna represents an intermediate stage between a more primitive tooth pattern seen in owenettids, whereas the lower teeth abduct near the side of the tongue, resulting in no tooth-to-tooth collision between the upper and lower teeth. This trait is seen within most horned procolophonids, as an adaptation for herbivory. Because of this we can say with safety that Eomurruna feed mainly of fibrous, low-lying vegetation as well as (most-likely) occasionally feeding on small invertebrates such as insects.

In four individuals (QMF 6693, QMF 49497, QMF 49508 and QMF 49511) evidence for tooth replacement is present, adding more support for the hypothesis that procolophonids had a low rate of tooth replacement.

== Paleoecology ==
The world Eomurruna inhabited was still recovering from the recent Permian–Triassic extinction event, and as a result global biodiversity had remained low throughout much of the Early Triassic. The world at this time was generally a hot and arid Environment, reaching a temperature of 50 °C or even 60 °C at times.

Currently a high diversity of fauna has so far been recorded from the Arcadia Formation that lived alongside Eomurruna. This includes a high diversity of temnospondyls, the archosauriform Kalisuchus rewanensis, the archosauromorph Kadimakara australiensis, the lizard Kudnu mackinlayi as well as an indeterminate Dicynodont.
