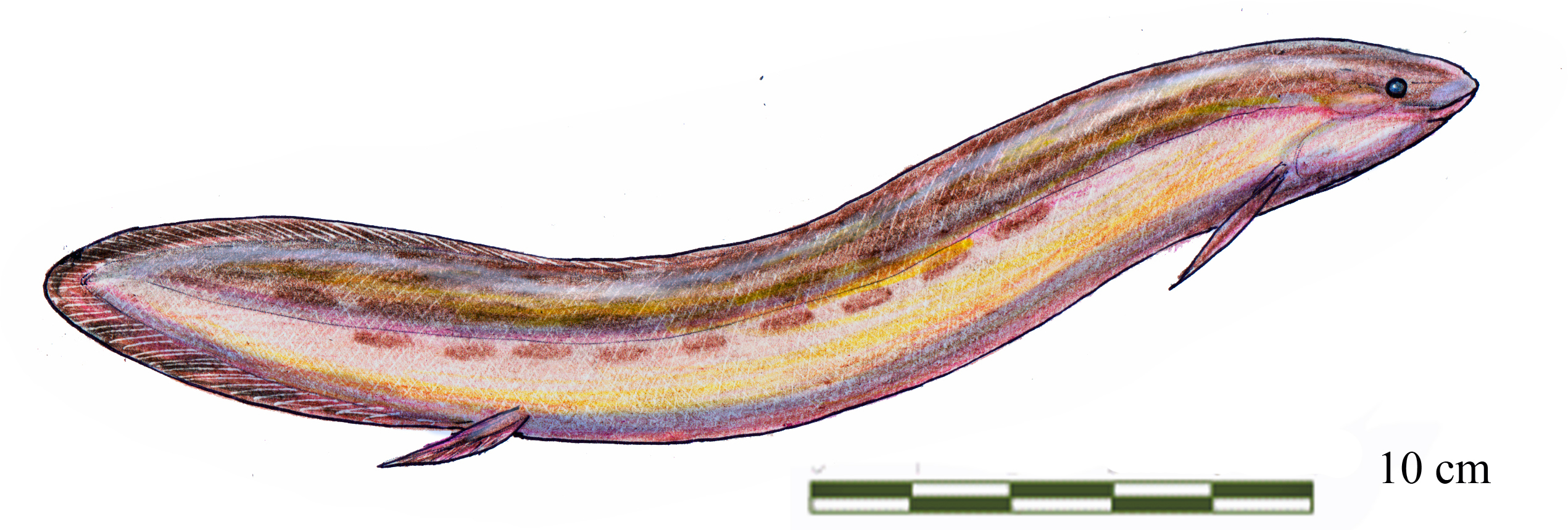
- Restoration

Scientific classification
- Kingdom: Animalia
- Phylum: Chordata
- Class: Dipnoi
- Order: Ceratodontiformes
- Family: †Gnathorhizidae
- Genus: †Gnathorhiza; Cope, 1883

Type species
- †Gnathorhiza serrata Cope, 1883

Species
- G. pusilla Cope, (1877); G. serrata Cope, 1883; G. dikeloda Olson, 1951; G. noblensis Olson & Daly, 1972; G. bothrotreta Berman, 1976; G. bogdensis Minkh, 1977; G. lozovskii Minikh, 1977; G. otschevi Minikh, 1977; G. triassica Minikh, 1977; G. tatarica Minikh, 1989

= Gnathorhiza =

Gnathorhiza Temporal range: Late Carboniferous to Early Triassic

Extinct genus of fishes

Gnathorhiza is an extinct genus of prehistoric lobe-finned fish (lungfish) which lived from the Carboniferous period to the Early Triassic epoch. It is the only known lungfish genus to have crossed the Permo-Triassic boundary. Several species have been described, ranging in size from 5 to 50 centimeters.

== Taxonomy ==
Gnathorhiza serrata was originally described by Edward Drinker Cope in 1883 based on fossilized teeth collected in Permian strata from Texas. Cope stated in the original description of the species that it may belong to the petalodont family, though he personally found that doubtful and thought the tooth roots were more like those of sharks. Later authors would recognize Gnathorhiza to be a lungfish and more species would be assigned to the genus. In 1934, Romer and Smith assigned the genus to the family Lepidosirenidae on the basis that Gnathorhiza exhibited a similar shearing motion of the jaw to extant Lepidosiren and Protopterus. In 1977, Gnathorhiza would be moved to a new family, Gnathorhizidae, which was thought to be the sister group to the extant Lepidosirenidae and Protopteridae based on morphological evidence. More recent phylogenetic analyses however has recovered Gnathorhizidae as a basal family of lungfish, not closely related to any extant lungfish families.

== Distribution and habitat ==
The numerous described species of Gnathorhiza have been found across the US, Germany, Russia, Poland and Kazakhstan, with additional remains referred to Gnathorhiza sp. being known from the Gharif Formation of Oman and the Corumbatai and Rio do Rasto formations of Brazil.

The oldest records of the genus come from Pennsylvanian-aged deposits in the United States, including freshwater deposits of the El Cobre Canyon Formation, estuarine strata in the Black Prince Limestone and marine strata in Kansas. During the early Permian, Gnathorhiza diversified into multiple species within North America, and also spread towards Germany and Oman. In the late Permian, the genus is recorded only in Russia and Brazil. Four species of Gnathorhiza are known from the Triassic, found in Russia, Poland and western Kazakhstan. The geologically youngest record of the species is from the uppermost Olenekian of Russia, where it is outnumbered by other lungfish genera (including Arganodus, Ceratodus and Ptychoceratodus) which may have replaced it.

== Paleobiology ==
=== Aestivation ===
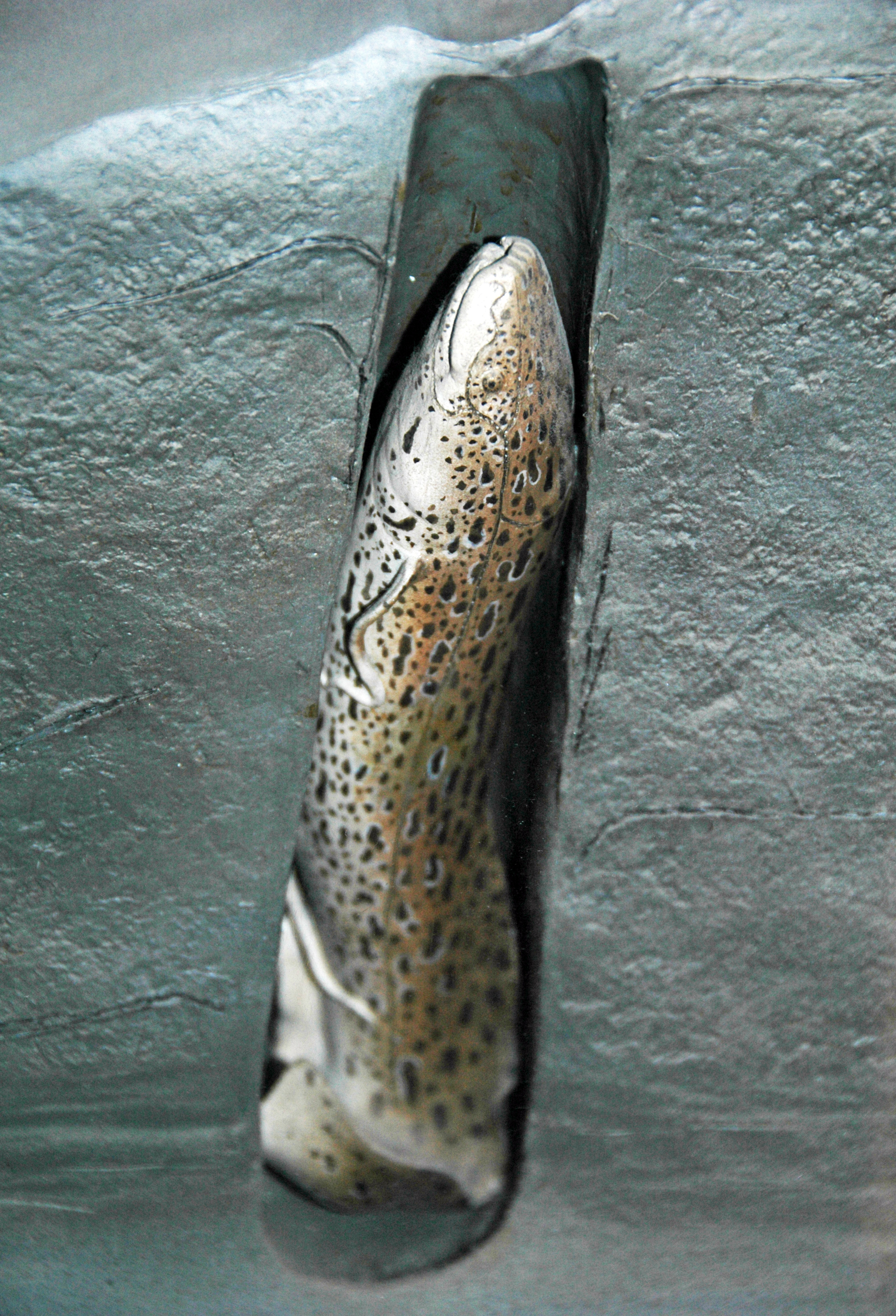
Model of Gnathorhiza aestivating within a burrow, on display at the Cincinnati Museum Center

Fossilized remains of Gnathorhiza have been discovered within burrows at various localities, including the Wellington, Arroyo, and Matfield formations. These burrows were likely constructed by the lungfish for aestivation, a behaviour observed in extant Lepidosiren and Protopterus lungfish, and the examined Gnathorhiza burrows are similar to those of extant lungfish. However, Gnathorhiza would have evolved this behavior independently from the extant taxa. In the Arroyo Formation, burrows ranged from 4 to 14 centimeters in diameter. Judging from the lithology and form of the burrows, Gnathorhiza used its mouth to excavate them. During aestivation, the fish would have stood within the burrow on its tail, which was stout and strong to support the animal in this position. At some localities, intersecting burrow structure indicates repeated burrowing cycles, and that alternating wet and dry seasons were present.

=== Euryhalinity ===
Because specimens have been found in Carboniferous and Permian strata representing freshwater, estuarine and marine environments, it is believed that Gnathorhiza was a euryhaline lungfish, capable of adapting to a wide range of salinities. Furthermore, considering that the oldest known specimens of the genus originate from North America and that it had spread into Europe by the Permian period, Gnathorhiza may have crossed the sea to colonize Europe, further supporting the idea that it was salt-tolerant. However, Gnathorhiza specimens dating to the Triassic period are all from freshwater deposits, suggesting the genus became strictly freshwater after the Permian–Triassic extinction event.
