= Beltanodus =

Beltanodus Temporal range: Triassic

Scientific classification
- Kingdom: Animalia
- Phylum: Chordata
- Class: Dipnoi
- Order: Ceratodontiformes
- Family: †Gnathorhizidae
- Genus: †Beltanodus; Schultze, 1981

Extinct genus of lungfish

Beltanodus is an extinct genus of prehistoric lungfish which lived during the Triassic period.
