= Indolyrocephalus =

Indolyrocephalus Temporal range: Induan

Scientific classification
- Kingdom: Animalia
- Phylum: Chordata
- Clade: Tetrapoda
- Order: †Temnospondyli
- Suborder: †Stereospondyli
- Family: †Trematosauridae
- Genus: †Indolyrocephalus; Tripathi, 1969
- Species: †I. huxleyi

Binomial name
- †Indolyrocephalus huxleyi (Lydekker, 1882)

Synonyms
- Gonioglyptus huxleyi Lydekker, 1882

Extinct genus of temnospondyls

Indolyrocephalus is an extinct genus of temnospondyls belonging to the family Trematosauridae. It contains a single species, I. huxleyi, from the Early Triassic Panchet Formation of India. It was initially classified in Gonioglyptus, then into its own genus Indolyrocephalus, and then back into Gonioglyptus, but is presently placed in Indolyrocephalus once again.
