= Namatozodia =

Namatozodia Temporal range: Middle Triassic (Ladinian) ~239 Ma

Scientific classification
- Kingdom: Animalia
- Phylum: Chordata
- Class: Dipnoi
- Order: Ceratodontiformes
- Family: †Gnathorhizidae
- Genus: †Namatozodia; Kemp, 1993
- Species: †N. pitikanta

Binomial name
- †Namatozodia pitikanta Kemp, 1993

Extinct genus of fishes

Namatozodia is an extinct genus of prehistoric lungfish. The genus, and its sole species, Namatozodia pitikanta, are described in Kemp (1993). The only known example of the species and genus is a small skull found in the Arcadia Formation, specifically in The Crater. This is a Ladinian to lowermost Carnian Triassic formation, in Western Queensland, Australia.

== Discovery and naming ==
The holotype specimen, QM F15000, is a partial calvarium without associated tooth material found at the Crater, near Rolleston in western Queensland.

The name Namatozodia is derived from the Greek νᾶμα, nama, or stream, and zodiaion, a diminutive of animal. Pitikanta is an Aboriginal word for 'young' in a dialect local to the area the fossil was found.

== Description ==
The known skull of Namatozodia is small, measuring only 7 millimeters by 3.5 millimeters, coming from an individual perhaps just 6 to 7 centimeters long, a size comparable to a juvenile Australian lungfish. However the skull bones are fully developed, apparently sutured and mineralized, and the individual was not necessarily juvenile.
