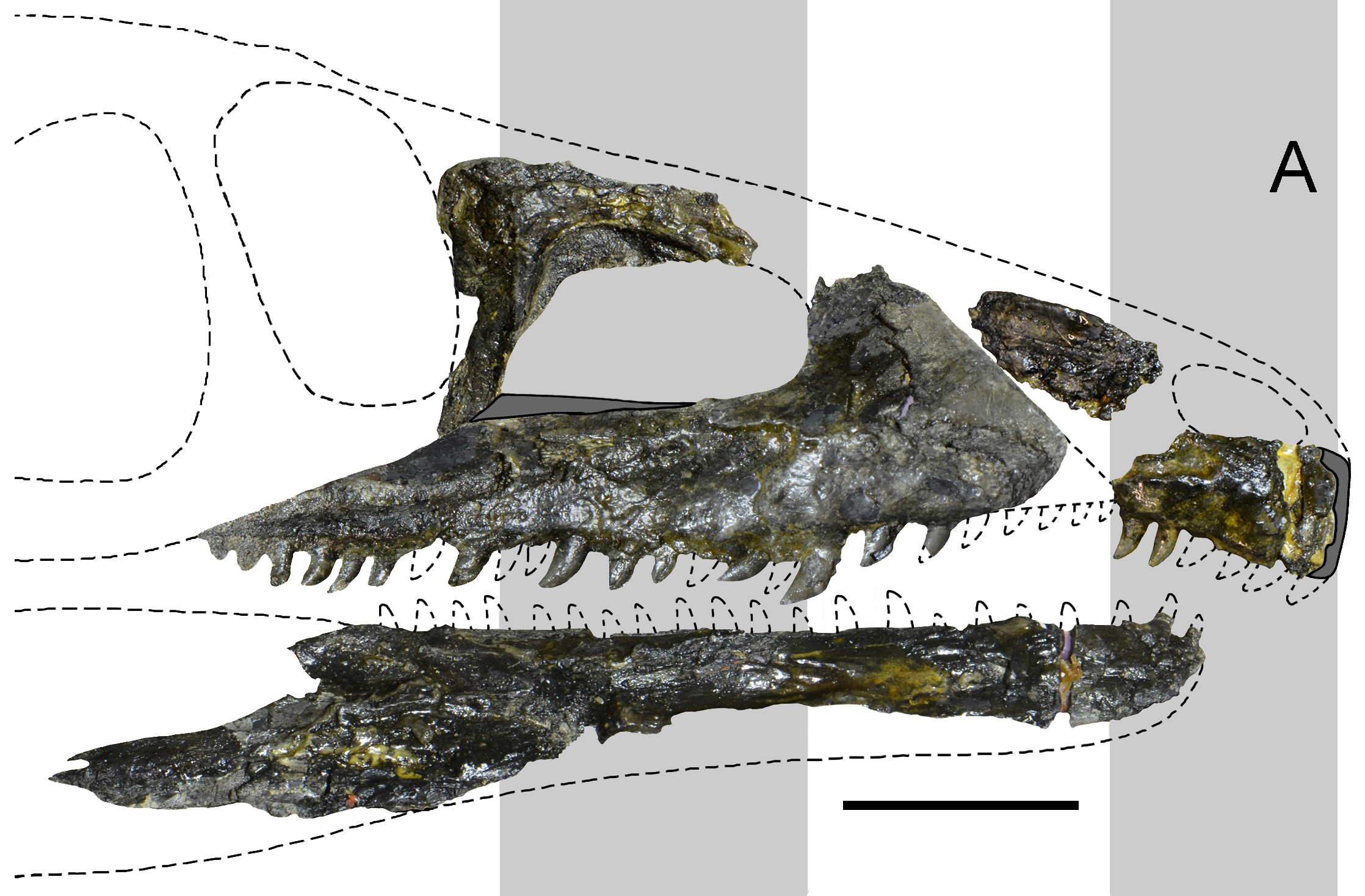
- Restored skull
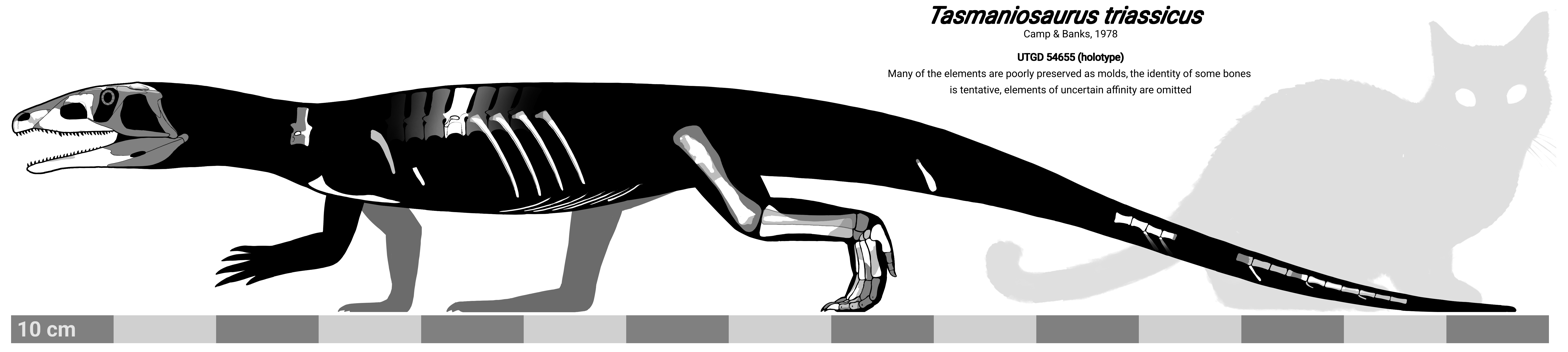
- skeletal reconstruction of the holotype

Scientific classification
- Kingdom: Animalia
- Phylum: Chordata
- Class: Reptilia
- Clade: Archosauromorpha
- Clade: Crocopoda
- Genus: †Tasmaniosaurus; Camp & Banks, 1978

Type species
- †Tasmaniosaurus triassicus Camp & Banks, 1978

= Tasmaniosaurus =

Tasmaniosaurus Temporal range: Early Triassic, Induan–Olenekian

Extinct genus of reptiles

Tasmaniosaurus ('lizard from Tasmania', although this genus is not a true lizard) is an extinct genus of archosauromorph reptile known from the Knocklofty Formation (Early Triassic) of West Hobart, Tasmania, Australia. The type species is T. triassicus. This genus is notable not only due to being one of the most complete Australian Triassic reptiles known, but also due to being a very close relative of Archosauriformes. Once believed to be a proterosuchid, this taxon is now believed to have been intermediate between advanced non-archosauriform archosauromorphs such as Prolacerta, and basal archosauriforms such as Proterosuchus. Features traditionally used to define Archosauria and later Archosauriformes, such as the presence of an antorbital fenestra and serrated teeth, are now known to have evolved prior to those groups due to their presence in Tasmaniosaurus.

== History and classification ==
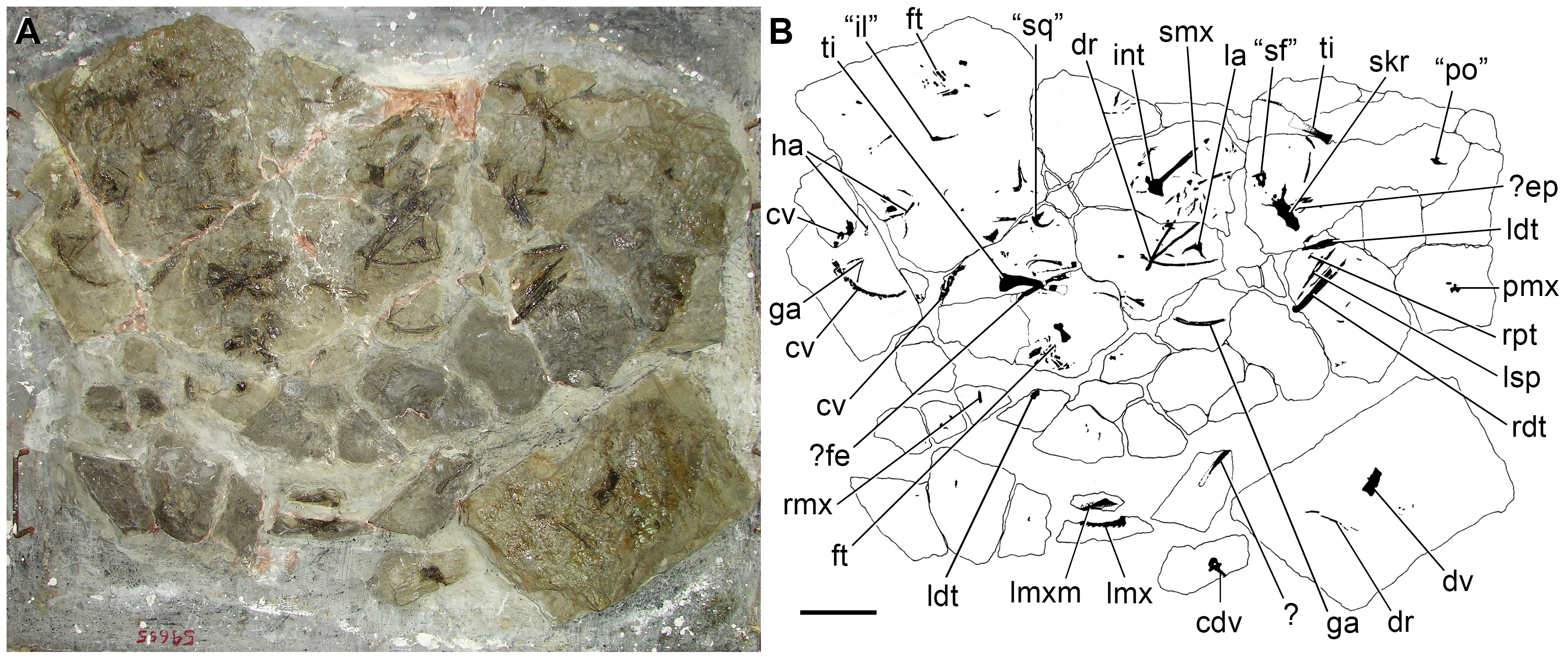
Blocks of the type specimen

First named as a nomen nudum in 1974, the genus received a formal description by paleontologists Charles Lewis Camp and Maxwell Banks in 1978. These descriptions considered it a proterosuchid archosaur. A redescription by British paleontologist Tony Thulborn in 1986 agreed with this interpretation. Since then, cladistic work has redefined the term "archosaur" to only include Avemetatarsalia (a lineage including pterosaurs and dinosaurs, such as modern birds) and Pseudosuchia (a lineage including modern crocodylians and their extinct relatives such as aetosaurs and raisuchids). As proterosuchids evolved prior to the split between these two groups, they are not considered archosaurs using this definition. In lieu of this revelation, the clade Archosauriformes is now used to encompass proterosuchids and archosaurs (as well as several other families) under one group. Archosauriformes is itself a component of Archosauromorpha, a broader clade which refers to all animals more closely related to archosaurs than to lepidosaurs, the other main group of reptiles including lizards, snakes and tuataras.

During this transition, Tasmaniosaurus remained ignored. This was rectified when the genus received a thorough redescription by Martín Ezcurra in 2014. In 2016, Ezcurra also included the genus in his comprehensive analysis of Archosauromorphs, which indicated that proterosuchidae (as it was usually defined) was an invalid polyphyletic grouping. This analysis included a phylogenetic analysis which incorporated Tasmaniosaurus and found that it was not in fact a proterosuchid. Rather, it was found to be the sister taxon of Archosauriformes, meaning that it was the closest known relative of members of that clade without technically being part of it (as it was not closer to either proterosuchids or other archosauriforms).

== Description ==
Tasmaniosaurus is known from a single partial skeleton, UTGD (University of Tasmania School of Earth Sciences) 54655. This holotype specimen consists of various skull fragments, vertebrae, ribs, an interclavicle and bones of the back legs. The specimen as a whole is jumbled and missing many elements, and some of the bones preserved within it have not been identified with absolute certainty. Even so, it is considered one of the most complete skeletons of any Triassic reptile unearthed in Australia. A few other bone fragments collected around Tasmania have been occasionally referred to this genus, but they are currently considered indeterminate and lost.

=== Skull and teeth ===
==== Snout bones ====
The premaxilla (a tooth-bearing bone forming the snout tip) was initially mistaken to be very short due to crushing. However, it was later found to be proportionally similar to that of most archosauriforms. It is rounded from the front and possesses a long and tall 'maxillary process' (rear extension). By comparing the orientation of this process with the tooth row, the snout tip was determined to be only slightly projected downwards, in contrast to the drastically hooked snout of putative proterosuchids. Although only a few teeth are preserved in the right premaxilla, a count of the tooth sockets helps estimates that 6 or 7 teeth were present in each premaxilla during life.

The maxilla (a tooth-bearing bone on the side of the snout) has a long tooth row and a tapering rear tip. The front tip also forms a tapering 'anterior process' which smoothly transitions into a triangular and upward-projecting 'ascending process'. This contrasts with proterosuchids, which have a less abruptly tapering anterior process, and erythrosuchids, which have a pillar-like ascending process. The shape of the upper edge of the maxilla indicates that Tasmaniosaurus had an antorbital fenestra, a hole in the side of the snout which seemingly characterizes archosauriforms. The presence of an antorbital fenestra supports the very close relation between Tasmaniosaurus and archosauriforms. As the skull bones are all preserved lying face down, it is difficult to assess whether an antorbital fossa (a depression which rings around the antorbital fenestra) was also present. The left maxilla preserves 14 teeth while the right preserves nine. An estimated 21 teeth were present in each maxilla during life. The lacrimal bone (in front of the orbit, or eye hole) is L-shaped and particularly similar to that of Proterosuchus. On the medial (inside) face, a large tuberosity (bony bump) is present where the forward and downward extensions meet. A partial pterygoid bone (a tooth-bearing part of the roof of the mouth) is preserved in the specimen, and is almost identical to that of Proterosuchus and Prolacerta. It preserves six or seven teeth, and likely represents the front part of the pterygoid.

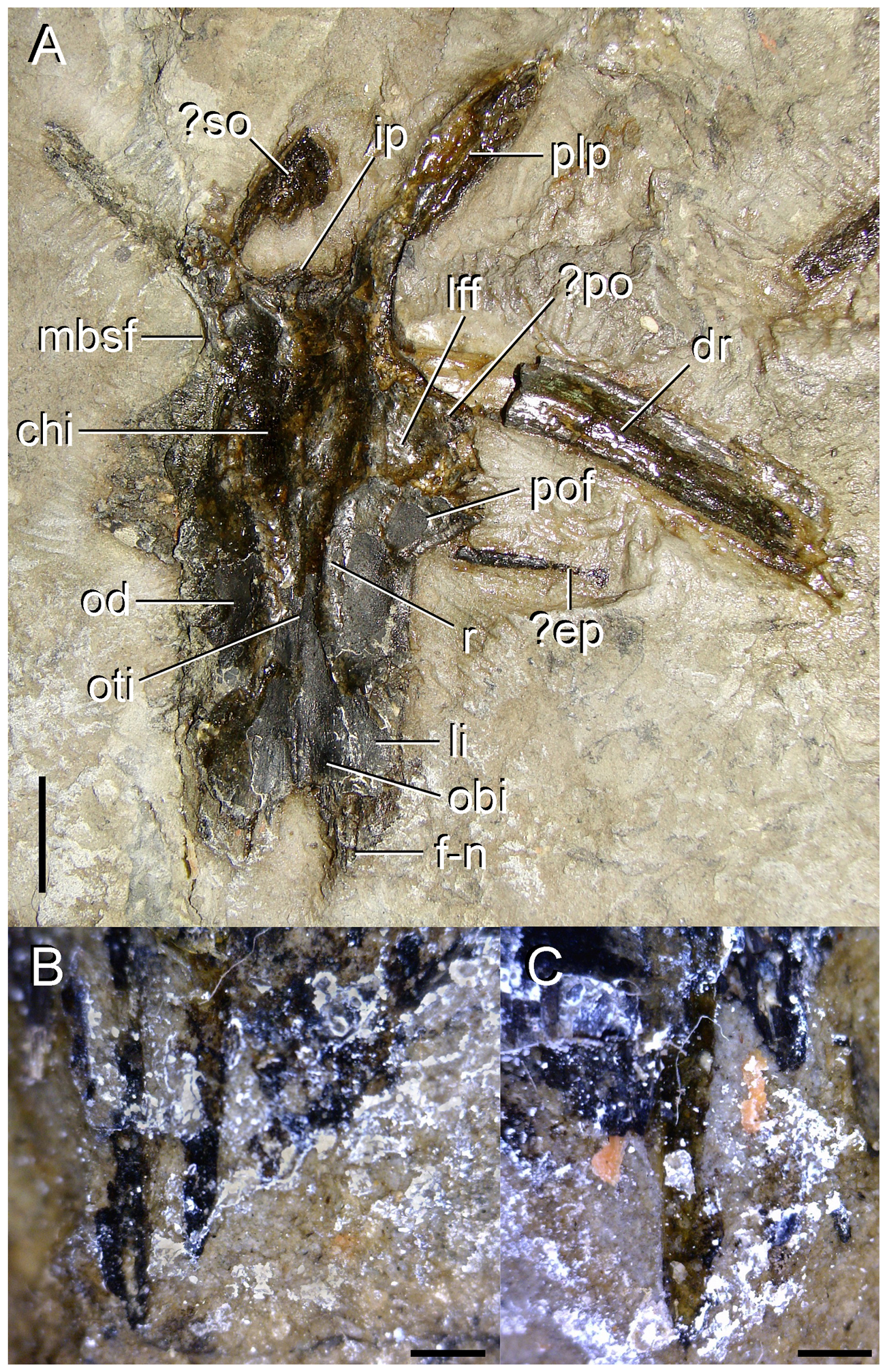
Skull roof bones of Tasmaniosaurus

==== Skull roof ====
Several bones of the skull roof were also preserved connected to each other in the holotype. Camp & Banks considered these to be frontals, parietals, an interparietal and postfrontals, all bones of the rear of the skull. Thulborn instead interpreted them as frontals, nasals and postorbitals, on the upper side of the snout. Most recently, Ezcurra discussed both of these interpretations and concluded that Camp & Banks were correct in their identification of the bones. The frontals are long and unfused, and possess thin "finger-like" extensions which would have connected to the nasals. Each postfrontal, which formed the upper rear edge of the orbit, is similar to that of Archosaurus but the extent of its contact with the other bones is unclear. The parietals are unfused and have wide and concave outer edges, forming the inner edge of the upper temporal fenestrae (a pair of large holes on each side of the back of the head). The back of each parietal has a long bony rod which extends backwards and curves outwards (a posterolateral process), forming an angle of about 20 degrees with the midline of the skull. A large crescent shape interparietal lies at the back of the skull roof, between the posterolateral processes of the parietals, similar to proterosuchids. Two smaller bone fragments were also found near the skull roof and may have been a supraoccipital and epipterygoid (both bones of the braincase), although such an assignment is uncertain.

==== Lower jaw ====
The dentaries (the main tooth-bearing bones of the lower jaw) are long, thin and straight, similar to those of Prolacerta and Protorosaurus but contrasting with the robust and/or upwards-curving jaws of most basal archosauriforms. In fact, the tooth row at the very tip of the jaw slightly curves downward, forcing the first few teeth to project a bit forwards as well as upwards. The rear edge of each dentary has two tapering bony extensions, a short (but partially broken) 'posterodorsal process' on top and a much more prominent 'central posterior process' on the bottom. The dentaries are long enough that the front tip extends almost as far forward as the snout tip while the tooth row would extend almost as far back as the tooth row of the maxilla, both features unlike Prolacerta and Proterosuchus. Only five teeth are preserved in the left dentary, but more than 22 were likely present in life. A thick left splenial (a bone of the inside and lower edge of the lower jaw), similar to that of Proterosuchus, is also preserved.

==== Teeth ====
The teeth of Tasmaniosaurus are ankylothecodont, meaning that they are both fused to the skull and jaw bones by thin ridges (ankylodont) as well as placed in deep sockets (thecodont). They are also serrated, similar to those of archosauriforms but unlike practically every other archosauromorph. Although not all of the teeth are preserved in good condition, those that are, have a curved shape and are compressed from the side, making them knife-like, similar to most carnivorous archosauromorphs.

=== Spine and ribs ===
==== Vertebrae ====
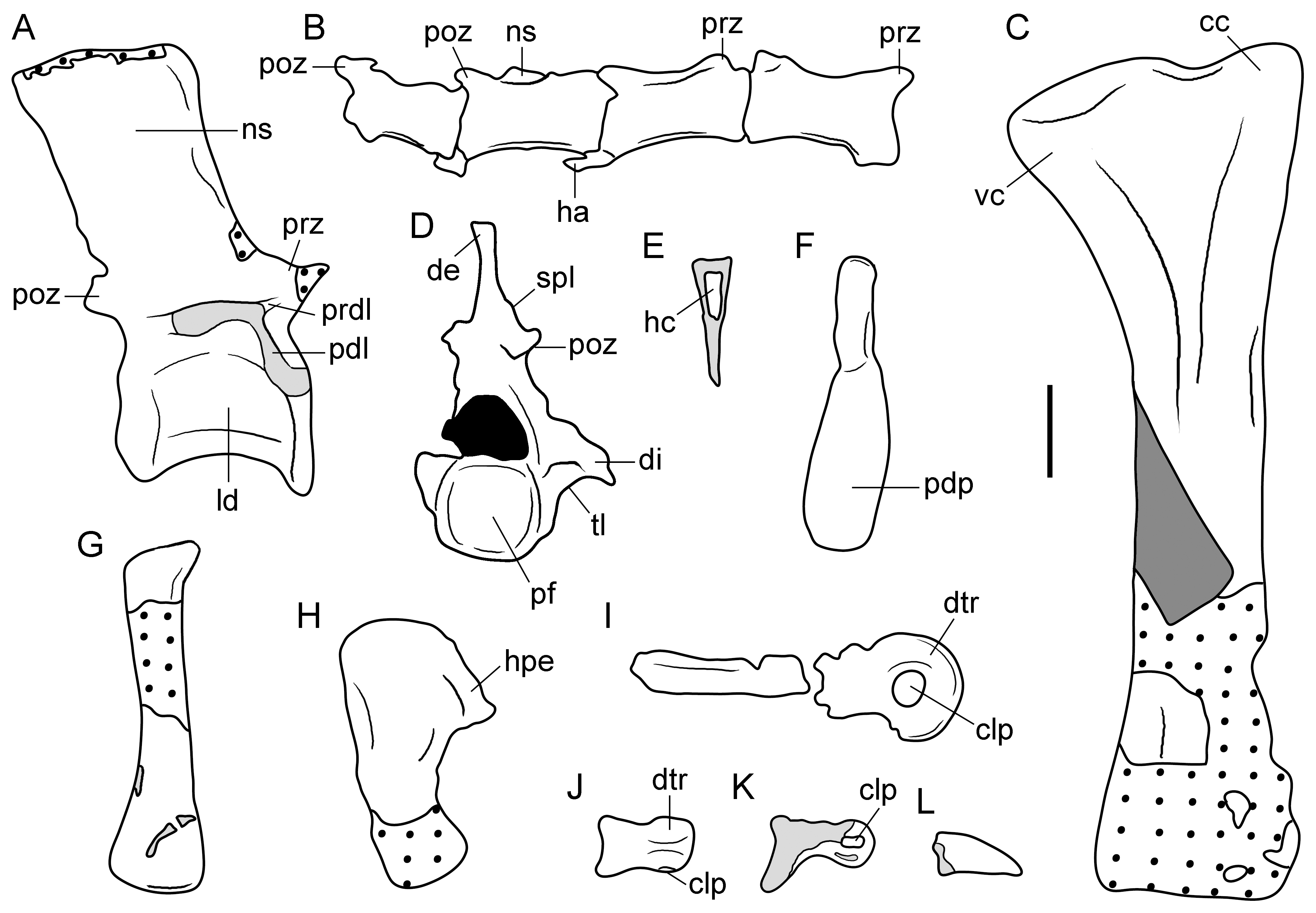
Illustrations of various vertebrae and limb bones of Tasmaniosaurus

The Tasmaniosaurus holotype preserves two presacral (pre-hip) vertebrae, one probably from near the transition between the neck and back and the other probably from mid-way down the back. The cervico-dorsal (neck-back) vertebra is slightly compressed with a shallow depression each side, and does not possess an opening for the spinal cord. Both the neural arch (the portion of the vertebra typically above the spinal cord) and neural spine (a plate-like extension on the top of the vertebra) are tall. The second preserved vertebra, a dorsal, is incomplete but similar to the cervico-dorsal. A curving table-like ridge (lamina) on the side of the vertebra extends forward (as a 'prezygodiapophyseal lamina') and then dips downwards (as a 'paradiapophyseal lamina') towards the front of the vertebra. Various other archosauromorphs also have prezygodiapophyseal laminae, but they are notably lacking in Proterosuchus. On the other hand, the tip of the neural spine does not expand outwards in this vertebra, similar to the condition in Proterosuchus. A few putative intercentra (small bones wedged between the lower part of the vertebrae) have also been reported in Tasmaniosaurus.

Various caudal (tail) vertebrae from different parts of the tail have been preserved, some articulating with each other. Vertebrae believed to have been at the front of the tail are more simple than the dorsal vertebrae, but seem to retain neural spines. On the other hand, vertebrae towards the rear of the tail are very simple, lacking any distinguishable neural spines, articulating plates, or laminae. There are also several haemal arches (arch-like projections from the bottom of the tail vertebrae) which expand into plate-like structures, similar to those of Proterosuchus.

==== Ribs and gastralia ====
Various ribs have been preserved in the specimen, with some being incorrectly interpreted as other bones. The most complete rib gradually curves inwards, but it is unknown whether any of the ribs are holocephalous (connecting to the vertebrae with one joint) or dichocephalous (with two joints). Gastralia (belly ribs) are present, and correspond to three different forms which broaden towards the back of the body, similar to those of Proterosuchus.

=== Other bones ===
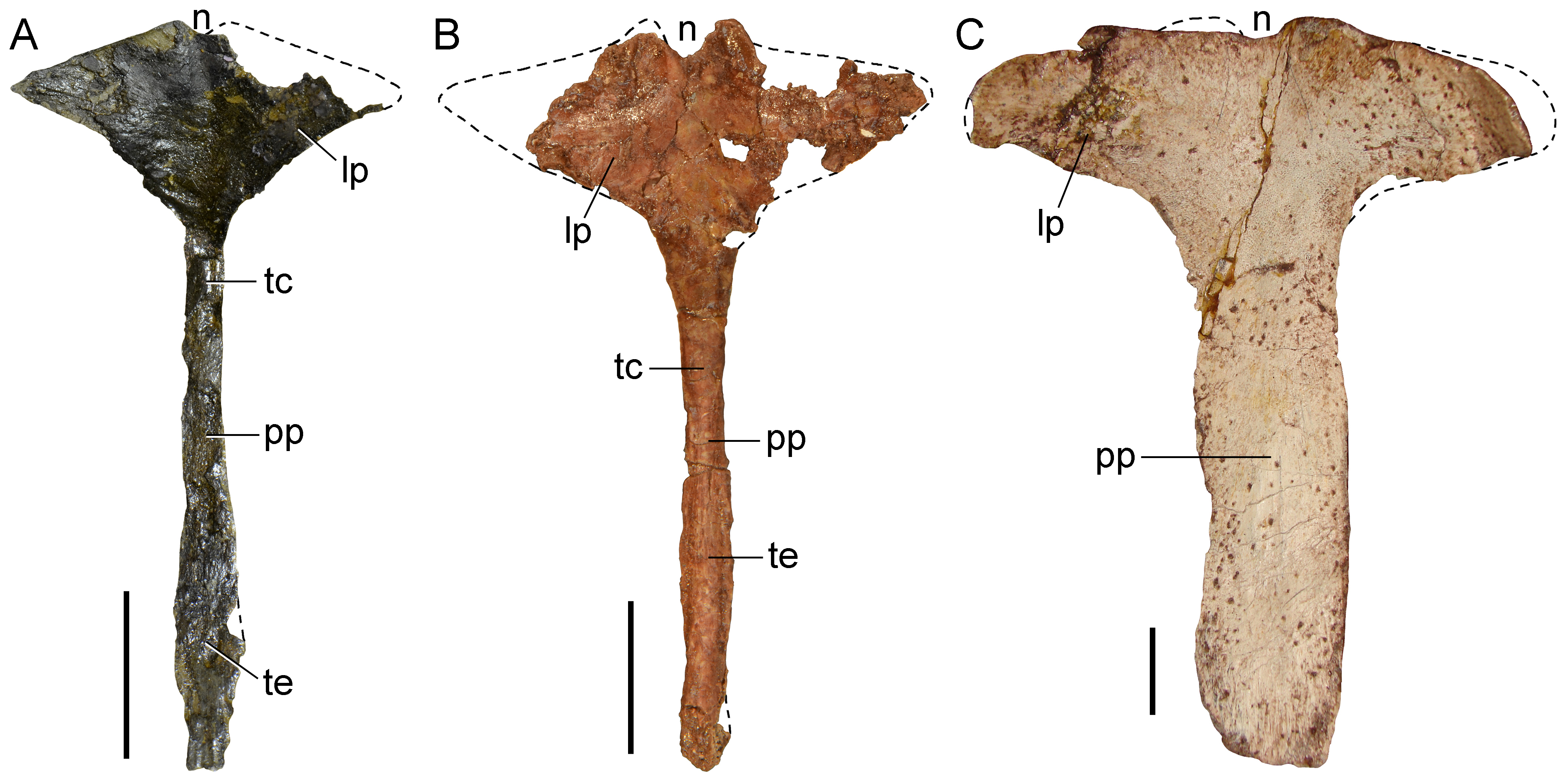
The interclavicle of Tasmaniosaurus (A) compared to that of Prolacerta (B) and Proterosuchus (C)

==== Interclavicle ====
The only preserved portion of the front appendages in the Tasmaniosaurus holotype is the interclavicle, a large and thin bone which runs down the center of shoulder girdle. This bone is characteristic, as the front part ends in a wide, diamond-shaped structure, which smoothly transitions to the main shaft of the bone. This resembles the condition in some archosauromorphs (like Prolacerta) but contrasts with most others (including Proterosuchus), which have a "T-shaped" interclavicle with a boxy front tip that abruptly transitions to the main shaft. Nevertheless, the front tip of this structure possesses a notch which is shallower than that of Prolacerta, more similar to that of Proterosuchus. The main shaft is very long and thin, with the thinnest section right behind the front structure.

==== Leg and foot bones ====
The specimen preserves several bones of the back legs, including a poorly preserved bone which has sometimes been identified as either a fibula or a femur. On the one hand, it is seemingly thinner than the preserved tibiae, supporting its identification as a fibula. On the other hand, this quality may be due to crushing, and the fact that it is longer in length than the tibia supports its identification as a femur. The other two leg bones are more easily identifiable as both tibiae. They are more robust than those of Proterosuchus and have wide proximal (near) ends. There is a depression in the middle of the proximal end of each tibia, dividing that end into two low ridges: a cnemial crest and a ventral condyle. This is similar to the state of the tibiae of Prolacerta.

Both back feet are preserved in the specimen, although jumbled and missing some bones. Each metatarsal V (the outermost main foot bone) has a hook-shaped proximal end. However, most of the other bones of the foot are difficult to evaluate. Some stout phalanges (toe bones) can be identified, as well as unguals (claws) which are dull and only slightly curved.

== Paleobiology ==
=== Brain ===
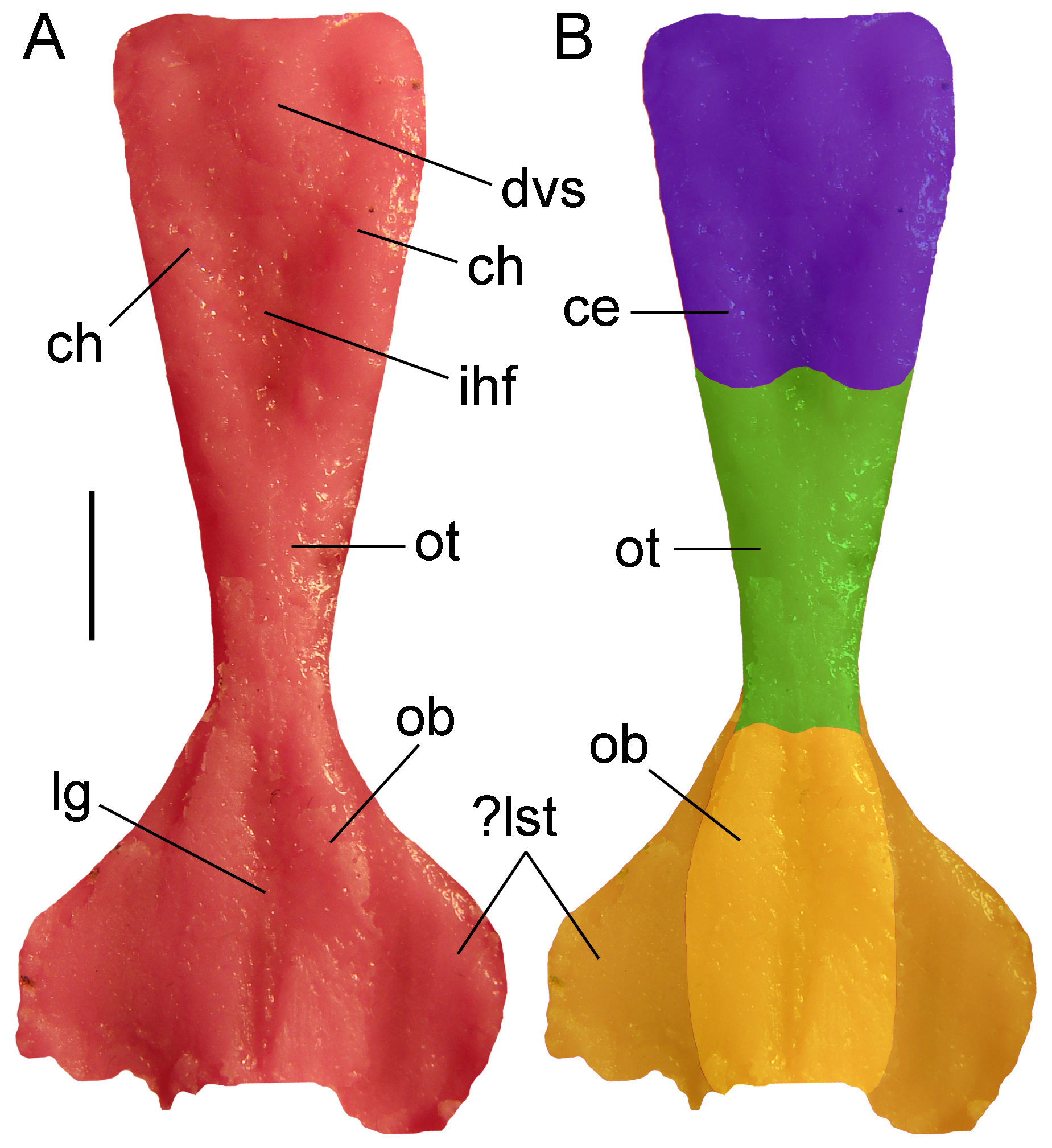
A latex endocast of the front part of the specimen's brain

The well-preserved skull roof of Tasmaniosaurus allowed for Ezcurra to reconstruct part of the creature's brain by means of a latex endocast. This endocast showed that the specimen's brain had large olfactory bulbs at the front, which lead into a thin olfactory tract in the middle and a somewhat wider cerebellum in the back. There are also wide and flat extensions at the front of the brain which are separated from the olfactory bulbs by a small groove. These extensions may have been the edge of additional non-brain organs (such as a Jacobson's organ) or alternatively another component of the olfactory bulbs, which would indicate that those parts of the brain were unusually large. Both of these interpretation have significant ramifications on the biology of this animal.

If they are a Jacobson's organ, then the notion that such an organ was not present in archosauromorphs can be proven false. This notion was originally formed due to the fact that neither crocodilians nor birds (the two extant groups of archosauromorphs) possess such an organ. However, Ezcurra notes that both of these groups have specialized modes of life which may have caused the organ to have been lost.

If they are parts of the olfactory bulbs, then Tasmaniosaurus would have had a superb sense of smell. It has been noted that aquatic animals have generally diminished olfactory capabilities compared to their terrestrial counterparts. Thus, this interpretation significantly lowers the likelihood that Tasmaniosaurus or its relatives (such as proterosuchids) were mainly aquatic. Other sources have also supported the idea that proterosuchids were terrestrial rather than aquatic or semiaquatic.

=== Diet ===
The specimen of Tasmaniosaurus also preserved a bone from another animal: a maxilla complete with teeth. This maxilla was originally interpreted as belonging to a temnospondyl amphibian. It was believed to have been a piece of gut content, the only known example of such preserved in a "proterosuchid". However, Ezcurra noted that several aspects of the specimen's preservation makes this assignment uncertain at best. In addition, he noted that the maxilla had a relatively low number of teeth compared to temnospondyls, and that it also had an ascending process which may have been the front edge of an antorbital fenestra. These factors made it much more likely that the maxilla belonged to a small archosauriform or potentially even a juvenile specimen of Tasmaniosaurus itself. Identification to any particular group is uncertain, but according to Ezcurra it is unlikely that the creature which the bone belonged to was a meal of Tasmaniosaurus. Nevertheless, the curved and serrated teeth of Tasmaniosaurus means that it is practically certain that it was a carnivore of some sort.
