= Capulomala =

Capulomala Temporal range: Mid-Late Triassic (Ladinian–Carnian) 239–233 Ma

Scientific classification
- Kingdom: Animalia
- Phylum: Chordata
- Clade: Tetrapoda
- Order: †Temnospondyli
- Suborder: †Stereospondyli
- Family: †Plagiosauridae
- Genus: †Capulomala; Warren et al., 2009

Type species
- †C. panchetensis Warren et al., 2009

Extinct genus of amphibians

Capulomala is an extinct genus of stereospondyl temnospondyl known from the Triassic. Separate species are recognised, C. panchetensis found in the Panchet Formation of India and C. arcadiaensis from the Tank locality of the Arcadia Formation, Australia.

== Description ==
Capulomala is described on the basis of postglenoid areas of the mandible, which possess a uniquely hypertrophied postglenoid process. Capulomala cannot be reliably associated with any known cranial material.
