= Panchetocynodon =

Panchetocynodon Temporal range: Induan ~252.3–247.2 Ma

Scientific classification
- Domain: Eukaryota
- Kingdom: Animalia
- Phylum: Chordata
- Clade: Synapsida
- Clade: Therapsida
- Clade: Cynodontia
- Family: incertae sedis
- Genus: †Panchetocynodon; Das & Gupta 2012
- Species: †P. damodarensis

Binomial name
- †Panchetocynodon damodarensis Das & Gupta 2012

Extinct genus of cynodonts

Panchetocynodon is an extinct genus of cynodonts from and named after the Early Triassic (Induan) Panchet Formation of India.
