= Indobenthosuchus =

Scientific classification
- Domain: Eukaryota
- Kingdom: Animalia
- Phylum: Chordata
- Order: †Temnospondyli
- Suborder: †Stereospondyli
- Family: †Lydekkerinidae
- Genus: †Indobenthosuchus; Tripathi, 1969

Extinct genus of temnospondyls

Indobenthosuchus is an extinct genus of stereospondyl temnospondyl.

== See also ==
- Prehistoric amphibian
- List of prehistoric amphibians
