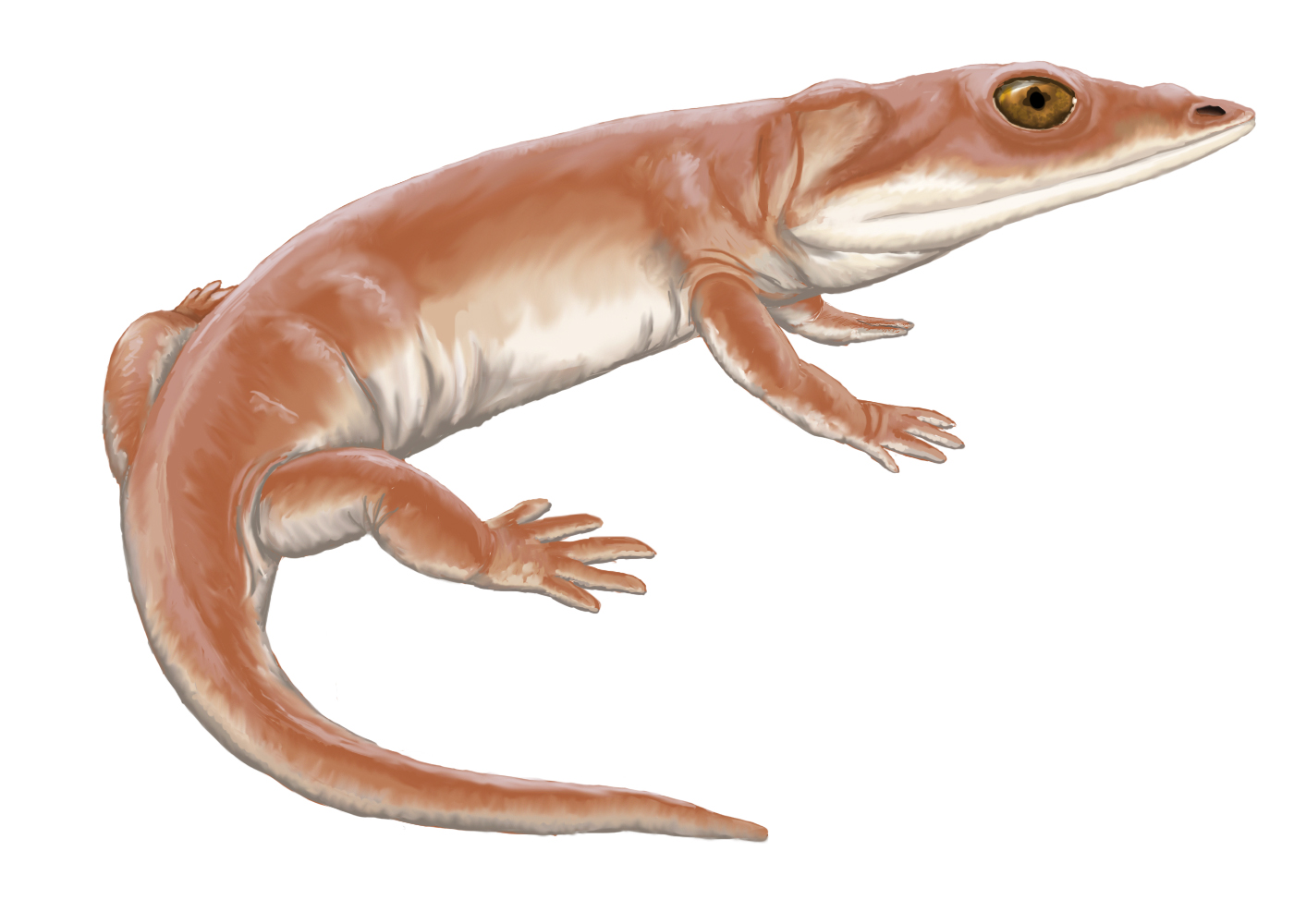
- Restoration of Lapillopsis nana

Scientific classification
- Kingdom: Animalia
- Phylum: Chordata
- Clade: Tetrapoda
- Order: †Temnospondyli
- Suborder: †Stereospondyli
- Family: †Lapillopsidae
- Genus: †Lapillopsis; Warren and Hutchinson, 1990

Type species
- †Lapillopsis nana Warren and Hutchinson, 1990

= Lapillopsis =

Lapillopsis Temporal range: Middle Triassic, (Ladinian) ~239 Ma

Extinct genus of temnospondyls

Lapillopsis is an extinct genus of stereospondyl temnospondyl within the family Lapillopsidae. Fossils belonging to the genus have been found in The Crater locality of the Middle to Late Triassic Arcadia Formation in Queensland, Australia.

== History of study ==
The type species and only known species is Lapillopsis nana, named in 1990 by Australian scientists Anne Warren and Mark Hutchinson. The name is derived from the Latin lapillus (pebble) and Greek -opsis (appearance) in reference to the material of this species being collected from within small rocky nodules. There are two known specimens, both nearly complete skulls with associated mandibles and associated postcranial elements. An additional fourteen specimens from the same locality were described by Australian paleontologist Adam Yates in 1999.

== Anatomy ==
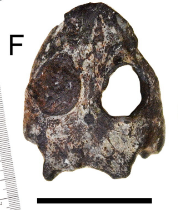
Holotype skull of L. nana (specimen QM F12284)

Lapillopsis was differentiated from the closely related Rotaurisaurus from Australia by several features: (1) a deep, semi-elliptical otic notch; (2) an abbreviated posterior skull table; (3) a broad shallow sulcus extending from the posterolateral corner of the quadratojugal to the posterior orbital margin; (4) a broadly flared anterior end of the cultriform process; (5) pterygoid-palatine separation, resulting in an ectopterygoid framing the interpterygoid vacuity; (6) jugal terminating at anterior orbital margin. The skull and mandible are particularly well-known, permitting a more or less complete reconstruction. Postcranial material consists largely of the pectoral and forelimb regions and a few vertebrae.

== Phylogenetic relationships ==
When it was named, Lapillopsis was identified as a micropholid dissorophoid; dissorophoids are almost exclusively Paleozoic in occurrence with the exception of Micropholis from the Early Triassic Karoo Basin of South Africa. Because computer-assisted phylogenetics were not widely available at the time, the authors made comparisons of distinctive features with those known in other clades and found many similarities with dissorophoids. At the time, dissorophoid systematics remained partially in flux, particularly as it related to several small-bodied terrestrial forms, and Warren and Hutchinson revived Micropholidae, originally created by Watson (1919), to encompass both Micropholis and Lapillopsis, while noting that the latter lacked several apomorphies of Dissorophoidea.

Yates' (1999) description of additional material of Lapillopsis and the new taxon Rotaurisaurus led him to create the family Lapillopsidae for this unusual group of small-bodied stereospondyls. Yates' phylogenetic analysis, as well as that of Yates & Warren (2000), recovered lapillopsids at the base of Stereospondyli. A supertree analysis by Ruta et al. (2003) recovered them in a vastly different position, as the sister group to eryopoids, dissorophoids (inclusive of modern amphibians), and zatracheidids.

Lapillopsis was found as the sister to Rotaurisaurus in a 1999 analysis that found the Lapillopsidae as basal stereospondyls. The most recent analysis of stereospondylomorphs by Eltink et al. (2019) recovered Lapillopsis within Lydekkerinidae, another small-bodied Early Triassic group, as the sister taxon of Lydekkerina, somewhat similar to the results of McHugh's 2012 dissertation. This is in contradiction to previous studies in which Lapillopsis has been recovered: outside of Lydekkerinidae but as its sister group, with dissorophoids, as the sister taxon of short-snouted stereospondyl clades like lydekkerinids and metoposaurids, or closely related to brachyopoids. There is a general consensus that lapillopsids are at least stereospondylomorphs if not stereospondyls proper, but there is no clear agreement beyond that. Previous workers have highlighted the potential that specimens may not represent adults or that diminished body size may cause attraction with other small-bodied taxa, like lydekkerinids, in an analysis.

== See also ==
- List of prehistoric amphibians
