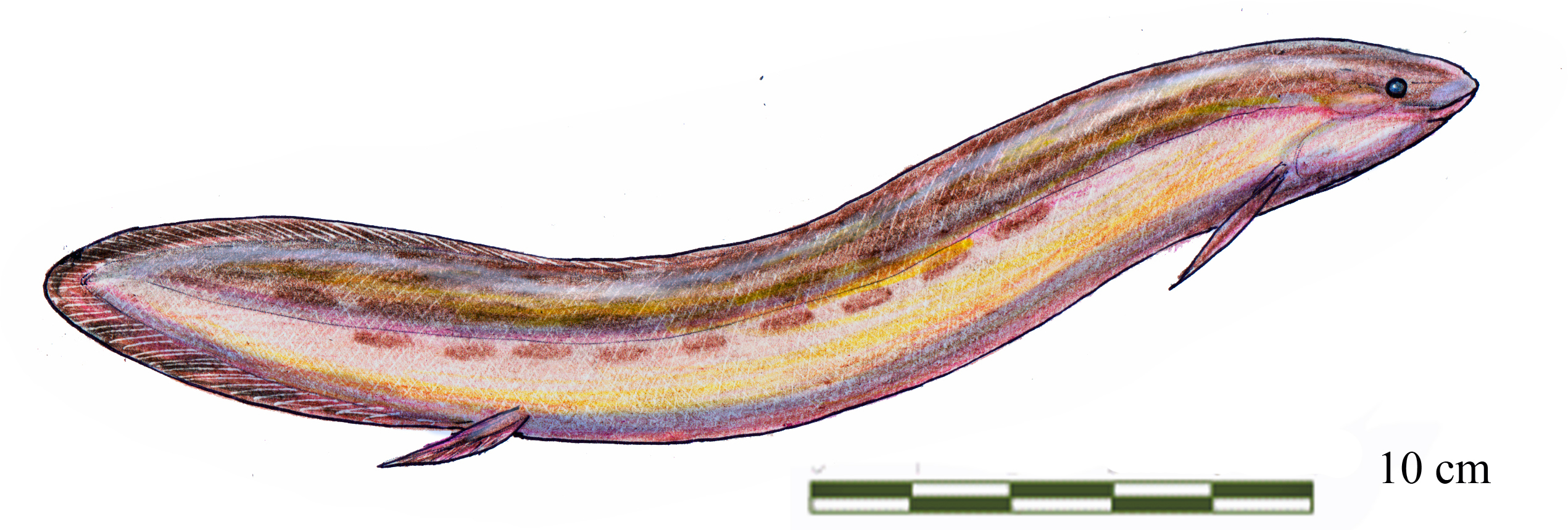
- Gnathorhiza

Scientific classification
- Kingdom: Animalia
- Phylum: Chordata
- Class: Dipnoi
- Order: Ceratodontiformes
- Family: †Gnathorhizidae; Miles, 1977

Genera
- †Gnathorhiza; †Monongahela; †Beltanodus; ? †Microceratodus; †Namatozodia; †Persephonichthys

= Gnathorhizidae =

Gnathorhizidae Temporal range: 323–237 Ma Carboniferous - Middle Triassic

Extinct family of fishes

The Gnathorhizidae are an extinct family of lungfish that lived from the late Carboniferous until the middle Triassic. Gnathorhizid fossils have been found in North America, Madagascar, Australia, and possibly Eastern Europe and South Africa. They are characterized by high-ridged toothplates that form cutting blades and a reduction in cranial bones.

== Taxonomy ==
Previously, based on morphological evidence, it was assumed that Gnathorhizidae was the sister group to the extant families Lepidosirenidae and Protopteridae, which still live in South America and Africa. However, phylogenetic evidence indicates that Gnathorhizidae is a basal group of freshwater lungfish with no close extant relatives, and African and South American lungfish are most closely related to Australian lungfish in Neoceratodontidae.

== Distribution ==
Gnathorhizids are found in North America, Eastern Europe, Australia, and Africa. Gnathorhizids from North America range from the Gzhelian through the Roadian. In Africa, gnathorhizids are found in Olenekian of Madagascar and possibly South Africa. Lungfish teeth attributed to gnathorhizids have been reported from the Lopingian to the Olenekian in Poland and Western Russia. It is likely, then, that gnathorhizids had a Pangean distribution throughout the late Paleozoic and early Mesozoic.

== Paleoecology and behavior ==
Gnathorhizids are found primarily in paleosols representing ephemeral wetlands. Additionally, gnathorhizids, unlike most groups of fossil lungfish, are often found in association with regular burrow structures, suggesting this group of lungfish may have estivated during the dry season, much like modern African and South American lungfish.

Unlike most fossil lungfish, but again, like modern South American and African lungfish, gnathorhizids have bladelike toothplates. This suggests gnathorhizids were active predators unlike most lungfish, which feed primarily on benthic invertebrates.

== Sources ==
- Berman, D. S., 1976, Cranial morphology of the Lower Permian lungfish Gnathorhiza (Osteichthyes: Dipnoi): Journal of Paleontology, v. 50(6), p. 1020-1033.
- Cunningham, C. R. and Dickson, E. D III, 1996, Distributions of Kansas Permo-Carboniferous vertebrate assemblages as a function of wet and dry seasons: Transactions of the Kansas Academy of Science, v. 99(1-2), p. 16-28.
- Huttenlocker, A.K. et al., 2005, An earliest Permian nonmarine vertebrate assemblage from the Eskridge Formation, Nebraska.
- Lucas, S.G. and Zeigler, K.E., eds., 2005, The Nonmarine Permian, New Mexico Museum of Natural History and Science Bulletin No. 30., pp. 133–143.
