= Pachygonia =

Pachygonia Temporal range: Induan

Scientific classification
- Kingdom: Animalia
- Phylum: Chordata
- Clade: Tetrapoda
- Order: †Temnospondyli
- Suborder: †Stereospondyli
- Family: †Brachyopidae
- Genus: †Pachygonia; Huxley, 1865
- Species: †P. incurvata

Binomial name
- †Pachygonia incurvata Huxley, 1865

Extinct genus of amphibians

Pachygonia is an extinct genus of temnospondyl amphibian from the Early Triassic Panchet Formation of India. It contains a single species, P. incurvata. It may potentially be a member of the family Brachyopidae.
