= Gonioglyptus =

Gonioglyptus Temporal range: Induan

Scientific classification
- Kingdom: Animalia
- Phylum: Chordata
- Clade: Tetrapoda
- Order: †Temnospondyli
- Suborder: †Stereospondyli
- Family: †Trematosauridae
- Genus: †Gonioglyptus; Huxley, 1865

Species
- G. longirostris Huxley, 1865; G. fragilis (Huxley, 1865)

Synonyms
- Glyptognathus Huxley, 1865; Panchetosaurus Tripathi, 1969

Extinct genus of amphibians

Gonioglyptus is an extinct genus of trematosaurian temnospondyl within the family Trematosauridae. It is known from the Early Triassic Panchet Formation of India. It contains two species: G. longirostris (sometimes classified in the genus Panchetosaurus) and G. fragilis (previously classified in the genus Glyptognathus). The species G. kokeni from Pakistan has since been reclassified into Aphaneramma.
