= Chomatobatrachus =

Chomatobatrachus Temporal range: Early Triassic, 252.3–251.3 Ma

Scientific classification
- Domain: Eukaryota
- Kingdom: Animalia
- Phylum: Chordata
- Order: †Temnospondyli
- Suborder: †Stereospondyli
- Family: †Lydekkerinidae
- Genus: †Chomatobatrachus
- Species: †C. halei

Binomial name
- †Chomatobatrachus halei Cosgriff, 1974

Extinct genus of temnospondyls

Chomatobatrachus is a genus of prehistoric temnospondyl from the Triassic.

== Taxonomy ==
A temnospondyl species placed in a monotypic genus Chomatobatrachus and allied to the Lydekkerinidae family. The description was published in 1974 by the palaeontologist John W. Cosgriff. The type locality is Meadowbank, a site associated with the Knocklofty Formation, where a skull was discovered in Induan terrestrial mudstone.

== See also ==
- Prehistoric amphibian
- List of prehistoric amphibians
