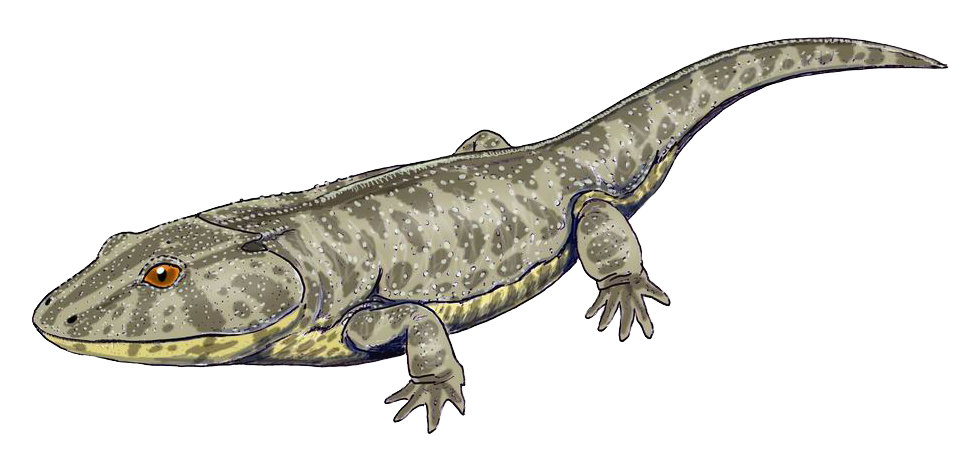
- Life restoration of Lyddekerina huxleyi

Scientific classification
- Kingdom: Animalia
- Phylum: Chordata
- Clade: Tetrapoda
- Order: †Temnospondyli
- Suborder: †Stereospondyli
- Family: †Lydekkerinidae; Watson, 1919

Synonyms
- Deltacephalidae Maryánska and Shishkin, 1996

= Lydekkerinidae =

Lydekkerinidae Temporal range: Triassic, 252.3–247.2 Ma

Extinct family of temnospondyls

Lydekkerinidae is a family of stereospondyl temnospondyls that lived in the Early Triassic period. During this time period, lydekkerinids were widely distributed, with putative remains reported from Russia, Greenland, India, South Africa, Madagascar, Australia, and Antarctica. In contrast to most other stereospondyls, lydekkerinids were relatively small-bodied (most with skulls less than 10 cm in length). The type genus is Lydekkerina, the namesake of the family and the best-known lydekkerinid.

== Description ==
The identification of features shared among lydekkerinids (synapomorphies) necessarily varies depending on which taxa are considered to belong to this group (see further in next section). In the most expansive concept, the family includes the eponymous Lydekkerina (and junior synonyms like 'Broomulus' and 'Limnoiketes'), Eolydekkerina from South Africa, Deltacephalus from Madagascar, Luzocephalus from Russia and Greenland (which includes the 'Aquiloniferus' of Bjerring (1999), which is largely refuted by other workers), Chomatobatrachus from Australia, and indeterminate records from Antarctica and India ('Indobenthosuchus' and 'Cryobatrachus'). However, most previous workers have not considered all of these taxa to be true lydekkerinds; in particular, the affinities of non-South African taxa have been challenged.

For example, Schoch & Milner (2000) considered all nominal lydekkerinids to belong to this family and listed featured like longitudinally oval, unpaired anterior palatal openings, with a pointed posterior end; and a broad and laterally extensive postorbital and prefrontal as synapomorphies. Jeannot et al. (2006) considered most nominal lydekkerinids to indeed be lydekkerinids except for Deltacephalus and the indeterminate records. They list features like a step-shaped contact between the nasal and prefrontal; indentation of anterolateral margin of interpterygoid vacuity; and a straight cheek margin when viewed in occipital view as synapomorphies. Conversely, Hewison (2007) did not consider Chomatobatrachus or Luzocephalus to be lydekkerinids and therefore listed a different set of features, such as palatine lacking denticles, but having an elongated postero-mesial process extending behind the most anterior ectopterygoid tooth; ectopterygoid lacking denticles; and septomaxillary with an ornamented roofing portion and an unornamented, plate- like intranarial portion. Many of Hewison's features (of which there are more than two dozen) are not synapomorphies but rather are part of a unique combination of features or are symplesiomorphies, and they are not mutually exclusive with the autapomorphies of other workers.

Most recently, it has also been suggested that another small-bodied Early Triassic clade, Lapillopsidae, might nest within Lydekkerinidae, rendering the latter paraphyletic. If so, this would introduce further uncertainty regarding diagnostic features of Lydekkerinidae.

== Classification ==
Lydekkerinids are usually classified as basal stereospondyls. Schoch and Milner (2000) placed them in the clade Rhytidostea along with brachyopoids and rhytidosteids, but this broader grouping is not widely employed today given the higher nesting position of brachyopoids and the uncertain position and monophyly of rhytidosteids. Lydekkerinidae was also sometimes historically placed within the largely defunct Rhinesuchoidea or within the still valid Capitosauroidea or Capitosauria, but this too has not been supported by more recent work. Most phylogenetic studies that sampled only certain nominal lydekkerinids within a larger temnospondyl sample have found lydekkerinids to be paraphyletic or polyphyletic. Furthermore, no complete phylogenetic analysis of all nominal lydekkerinids that would support monophyly in at least a restricted framework has been formally published. Luzocephalus, which would be the largest of the lydekkerinids with a skull length over 15 cm, has often been found to be more closely related to a family called Trematosauridae, such as in the study by Yates and Warren (2000). Chomatobatrachus has also been frequently dissociated from other nominal lydekkerinids. Below is a cladogram from Yates and Warren (2000) showing the polyphyly:

- Stereospondyli
  - Peltobatrachus
  - - Lapillopsis
    - - Rhinesuchidae
      - - Capitosauria
          - Lydekkerina
          - - Mastodonsaurus
            - - Benthosuchus
              - Capitosauridae
        - Trematosauria
          - - Luzocephalus
            - - Thoosuchus
              - Trematosauridae
          - - - Almasaurus
              - Buettneria
            - - - Laidleria
                - Plagiosauridae
              - - Rhytidosteidae
                - - Keratobrachyops
                  - - - Pelorocephalus
                      - Siderops
                    - - Xenobrachyops
                      - Batrachosuchus

The phylogenetic analysis of Damiani (2001) resulted in a monophyletic Lydekkerinidae, although it was only weakly supported and included what is now recognized as the small-bodied Early Triassic capitosaur Edingerella madagascariensis. Below is a cladogram from that analysis:

- Stereospondyli
  - Rhinesuchidae
    - Uranocentrodon
    - - Rhinesuchus
      - Rhineceps
  - - Lydekkerinidae
      - Chomatobatrachus
      - Lydekkerina
      - - Deltacephalus
        - "Parotosuchus" madagascarensis
    - - Mastodonsauroidea
      - Trematosauroidea

== Gallery ==
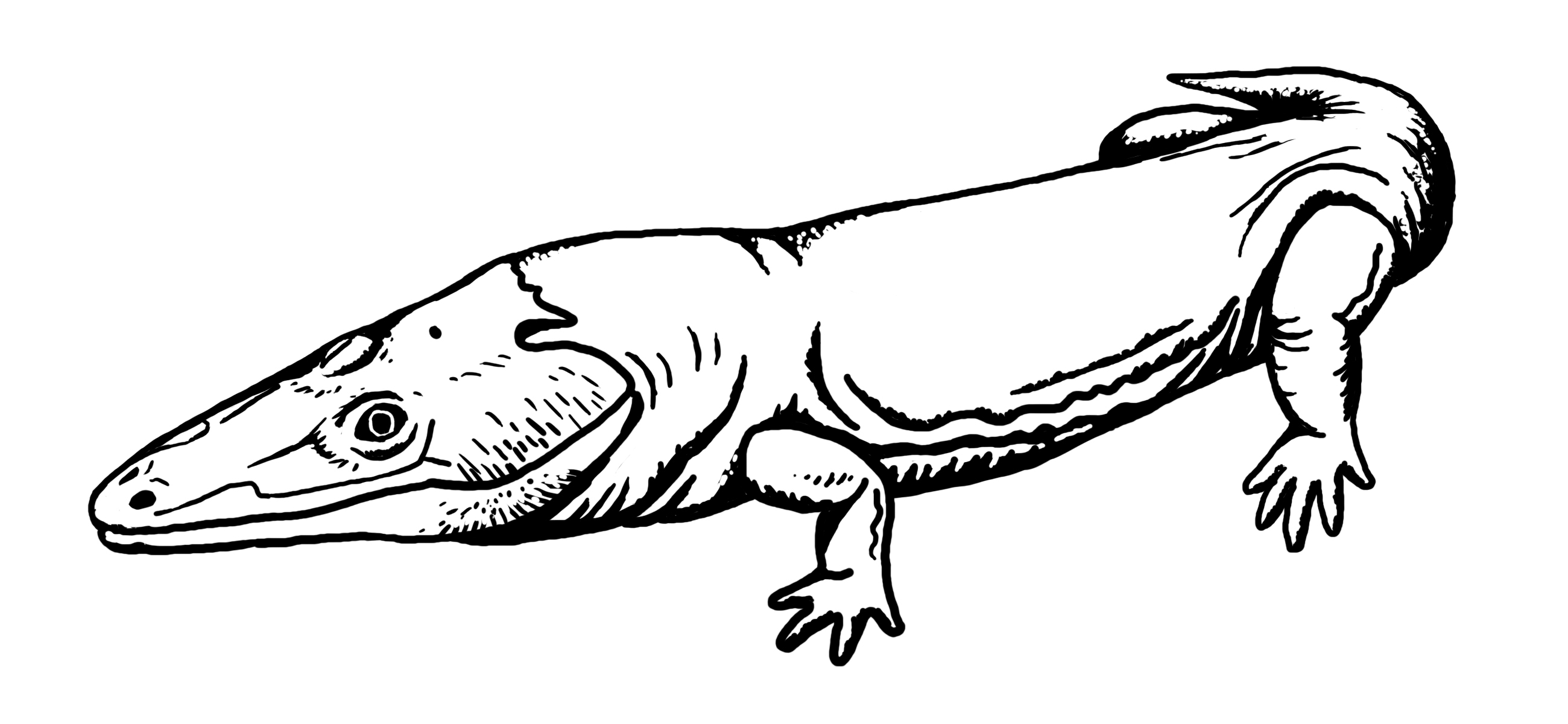
Eolydekkerina magna, of the early Triassic of South Africa

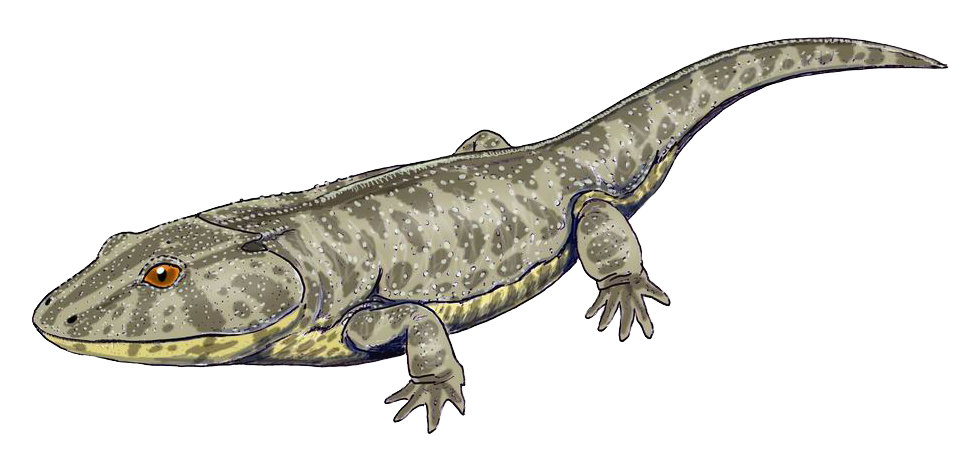
Lyddekerina huxleyi, of the early Triassic of South Africa and Australia

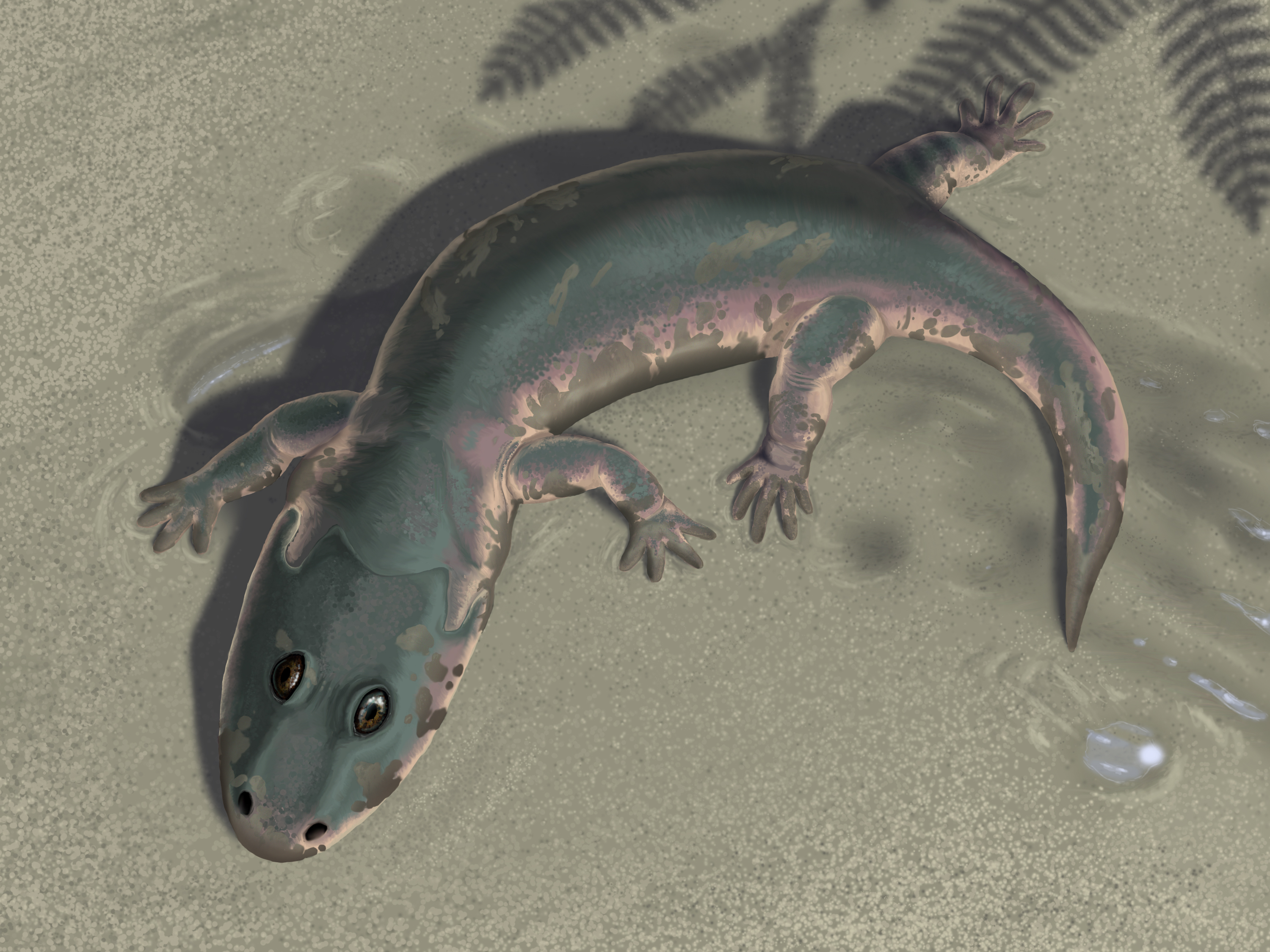
Cryobatrachus kitchingi, of the early Triassic of Antarctica
