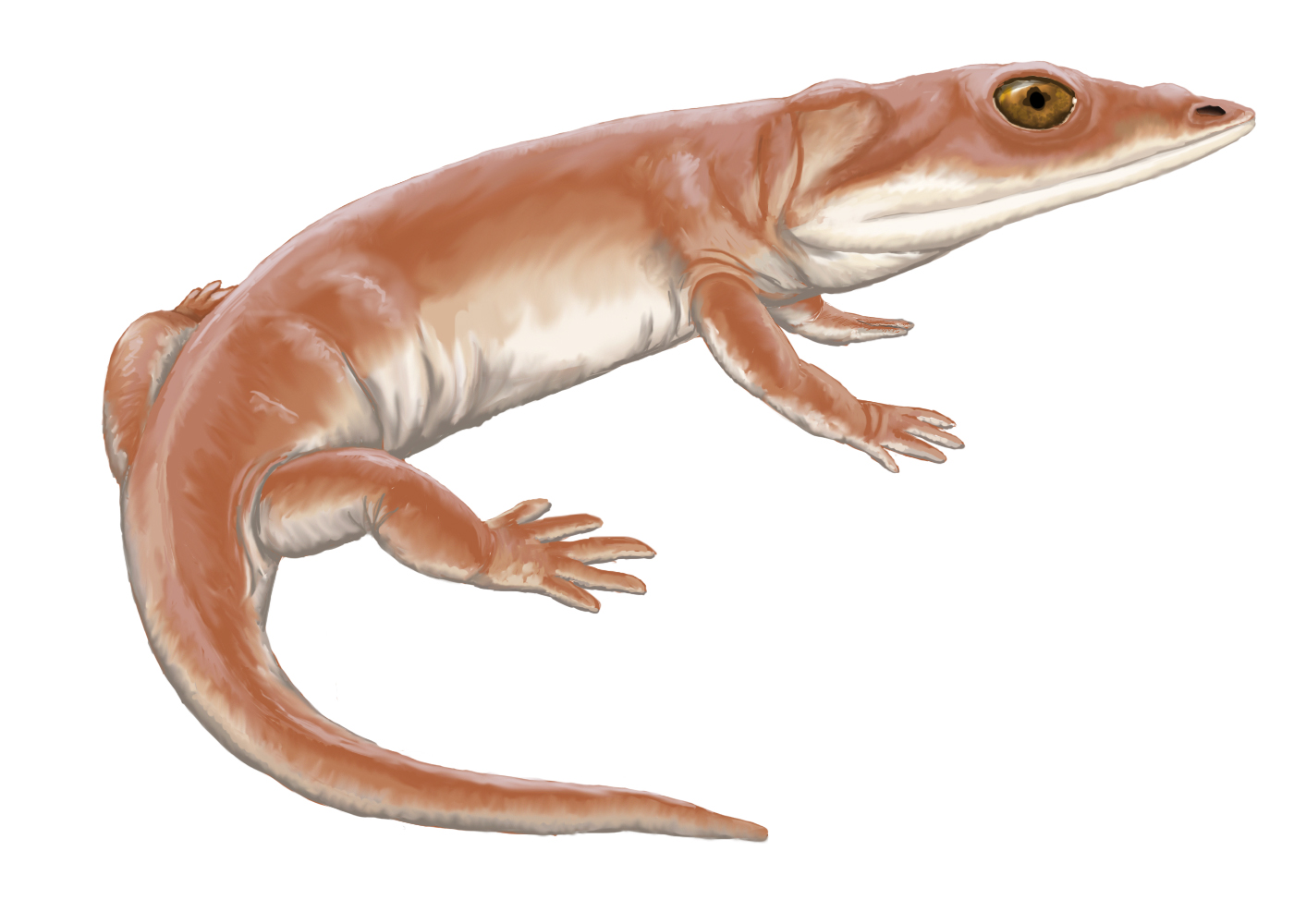
- Restoration of Lapillopsis nana

Scientific classification
- Domain: Eukaryota
- Kingdom: Animalia
- Phylum: Chordata
- Order: †Temnospondyli
- Suborder: †Stereospondyli
- Family: †Lapillopsidae

Genera
- Lapillopsis; Manubrantlia; Rhigerpeton; Rotaurisaurus

= Lapillopsidae =

Lapillopsidae Temporal range: Early Triassic

Extinct family of temnospondyls

Lapillopsidae is an extinct family of temnospondyls.

Lapillopsis was found as the sister to Rotaurisaurus in a 1999 analysis that found the Lapillopsidae as basal stereospondyls. Lapillopsis was found as a sister to Dissorophoidea by a 2017 analysis. Another relative of Lapillopsis, Manubrantlia was described from the Early Triassic of India, and Rhigerpeton was found in Antarctica.
