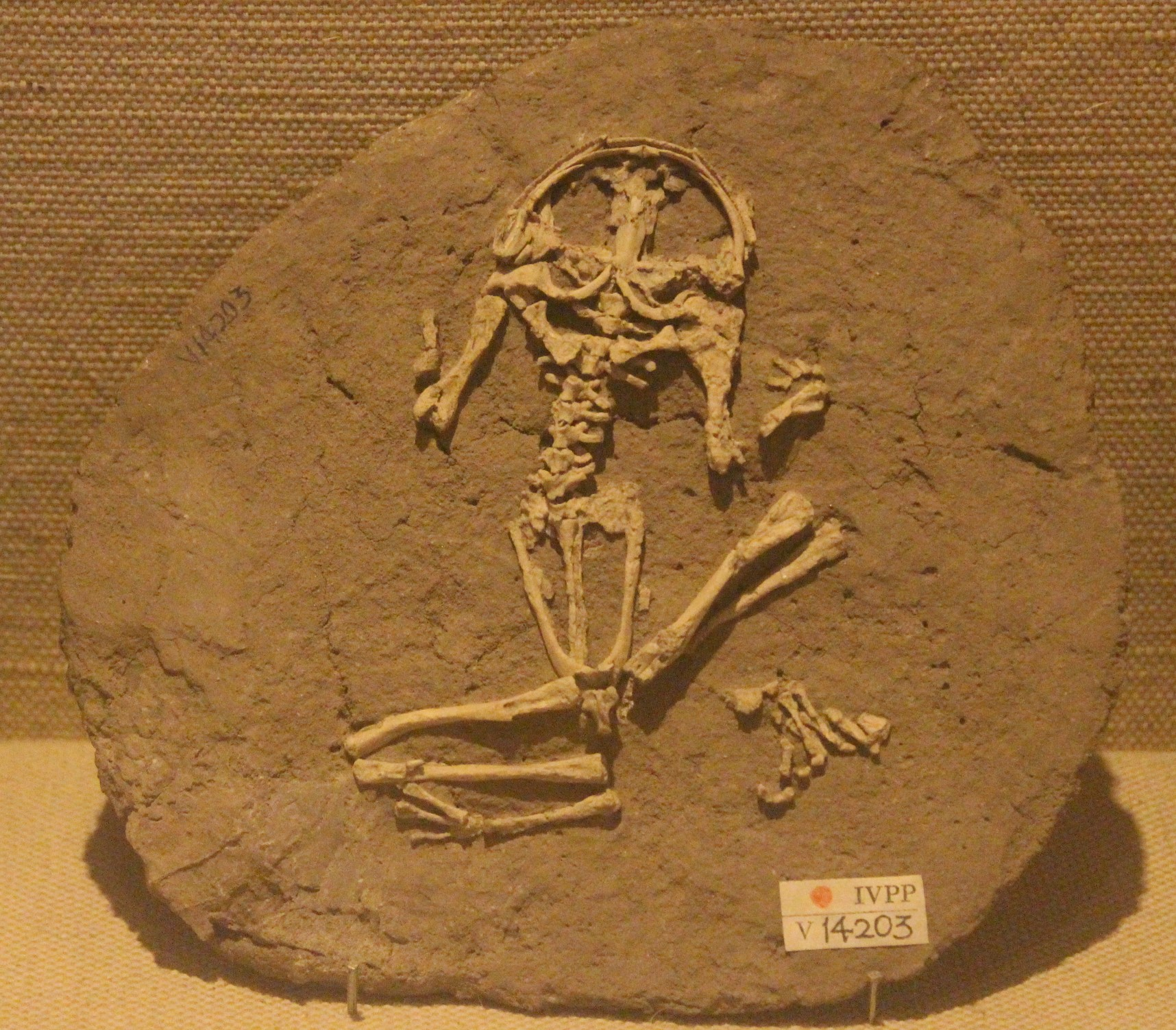
- Paratype specimen (IVPP V14203) of L. zhaoi, Paleozoological Museum of China

Scientific classification
- Kingdom: Animalia
- Phylum: Chordata
- Class: Amphibia
- Order: Anura
- Family: Pelobatidae
- Genus: †Liaobatrachus; Ji & Ji, 1998

Type species
- Liaobatrachus grabaui Ji & Ji, 1998

Other species
- ?Liaobatrachus zhaoi Dong et al., 2013; ?Liaobatrachus beipiaoensis (Gao & Wang, 2001)

Synonyms
- ?Callobatrachus Wang & Gao, 1999; ? Mesophryne Gao & Wang, 2001; ?Yizhoubatrachus Gao and Chen, 2004

= Liaobatrachus =

Liaobatrachus Temporal range: Early Cretaceous, 125–124.6 Ma

Extinct genus of amphibians

Liaobatrachus (meaning "Liaoning frog") is a genus of prehistoric frog, the first fossil specimen of which was recovered from the Yixian Formation of Liaoning Province, China. It was the first Mesozoic era frog ever found in China. The species Callobatrachus sanyanensis, Mesophryne beipiaoensis and Yizhoubatrachus macilentus were classified as species of Liaobatrachus in one study, but this has been rejected by other authors. The genus has been considered a nomen dubium by some authors due to the poor preservation of the holotype specimen. Fossils were found in the Sihetun locality of the western part of Liaoning province, in the lower part of the Yixian Formation, and date to approximately 124.6 Ma. Another specimen was collected near Heitizigou, 25 kilometres (16 mi) south of Beipiao. The specimen has a snout–vent length of 69 millimetres (2.7 in). Liaobatrachus is considered to be the most basal member of Discoglossidae based on phylogenetic analysis.

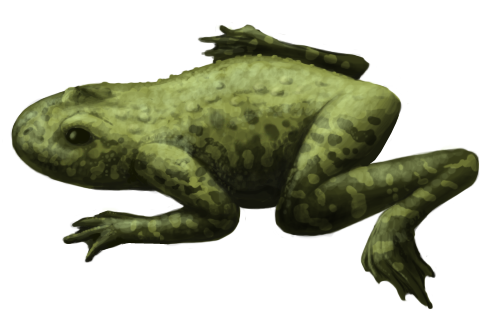
Life reconstruction

Fossil frogs are rarely found as multiple articulated skeletons, therefore the discovery of this taxon has provided important insight into anuran evolution.

The holotype, IVPP V11525, is known from a nearly complete skeleton exposed in a dorsal view on a shale slab. Its total body length (from snout to vent) is estimated at approximately 94 mm. It differs morphologically in many respects from all other discoglossoids, including the number of presacral vertebrae (9 instead of the usual 8) and other primitive characters. Although it had a mosaic of primitive and derived characters, it can be unequivocally placed as the most basal taxon of the clade. This shows that the taxon diverged early from the stem and evolved separately as a distinct lineage by the Early Cretaceous in East Asia.

The skull is described as being short and wide and is well preserved. The maxillary region is less well-preserved but it can be determined that each premaxilla bears 18–20 slender and conical teeth, and the maxilla bears approximately 40–50 fine pedicellate teeth. The vertebral column consists of nine presacral vertebrae, a single sacral vertebra, and a free urostyle. Three pairs of ribs were found associated with presacrals II–IV. The hind limbs are remarkably well-preserved and are slenderly built, with an approximate total length of 116 millimetres (4.6 in). Its hind feet have the phalangeal formula 2-2-3-4-3, with its fourth digit being the longest at 27 millimetres (1.1 in).

== See also ==
- Prehistoric amphibian
- List of prehistoric amphibians
