= Xestorrhytias =

Scientific classification
- Kingdom: Animalia
- Phylum: Chordata
- Clade: Tetrapoda
- Order: †Temnospondyli
- Suborder: †Stereospondyli
- Clade: †Capitosauria
- Family: †Mastodonsauridae
- Genus: †Xestorrhytias; Meyer, 1855

Species
- Xestorrhytias perrini Meyer, 1855

Extinct genus of amphibians

Xestorrhytias is an extinct genus of mastodonsauroid temnospondyl within the family Mastodonsauridae. The holotype was collected from the Lower Muschekalk in Meurthe-et-Moselle, France. It is generally regarded as either a junior synonym of Mastodonsaurus or as a nomen dubium.

== History of study ==
The type and only species, X. perrini, is based on a partial skull table from Luneville. Although the taxonomic authority for the official description is Meyer (1855), the name did appear in earlier literature like Meyer (1844), in which it would be considered a nomen nudum. It has generally been regarded as either a junior synonym of Mastodonsaurus or as a Mastodonsaurus-like but indeterminate mastodonsaurid. Schoch & Moreno (2024) list the species as a junior synonym, in partim, of Mastodonsaurus giganteus.

There has been some confusion over whether Meyer (1855) intended to refer all figured material to X. perrini or only the holotype; either way, most of the figured specimens are plagiosaurid, not capitosaur. Schoch et al. (2025) list it as a junior synonym in partim for the plagiosaurid Plagiosternum granulosum.

== See also ==
- Prehistoric amphibian
- List of prehistoric amphibians
