= Procerobatrachus =

Procerobatrachus Temporal range: Late Cretaceous, 94.3–89.3 Ma

Scientific classification
- Domain: Eukaryota
- Kingdom: Animalia
- Phylum: Chordata
- Class: Amphibia
- Order: Anura
- Family: Discoglossidae
- Genus: †Procerobatrachus; Roček and Nessov, 1993

Type species
- †Procerobatrachus paulus Roček and Nessov, 1993

Extinct genus of amphibians

Procerobatrachus is an extinct genus of prehistoric amphibian. It was described based on material from Uzbekistan.

== See also ==
- Prehistoric amphibian
- List of prehistoric amphibians
