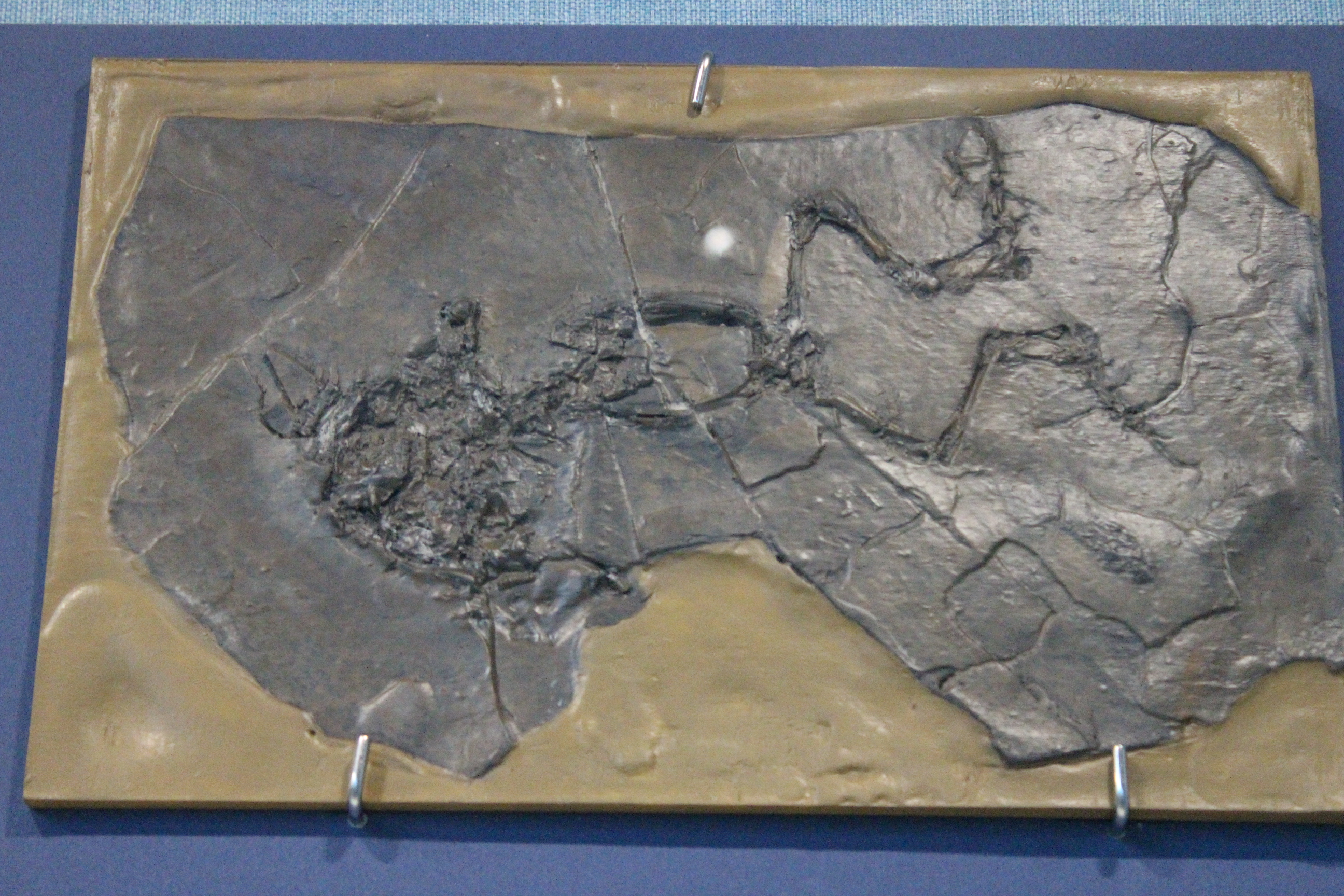
- M. linquensis specimen at the Baoding Natural History Museum

Scientific classification
- Kingdom: Animalia
- Phylum: Chordata
- Class: Amphibia
- Order: Anura
- Superfamily: Pelobatoidea
- Genus: †Macropelobates; Noble, 1924

Type species
- † Macropelobates osborni Noble, 1924

Species
- M. linquensis (J. Yang, 1977); Bufo linquensis J. Yang, 1977; M. cratus Gao, 1986 – synonym; M. osborni Noble, 1924

= Macropelobates =

Macropelobates Temporal range: Early Oligocene to Middle Miocene, 33.90–11.61 Ma

Extinct genus of amphibians

Macropelobates is an extinct genus of prehistoric frogs. It was described by Gladwyn Kingsley Noble based on material from Oligocene of Mongolia.

== Species ==
The genus contains two species:

- Macropelobates linquensis (J. Yang, 1977) — Shandong, China
- Macropelobates osborni Noble, 1924 — Tsagan Nor Basin, Mongolia

The two species are similar, however, and might be synonymous.

== See also ==
- Prehistoric amphibian
- List of prehistoric amphibians
