= Estesina =

Scientific classification
- Domain: Eukaryota
- Kingdom: Animalia
- Phylum: Chordata
- Class: Amphibia
- Order: Anura
- Family: Alytidae
- Genus: †Estesina; Rocek & Nessov, 1993

Type species
- †Estesina elegans Rocek & Nessov, 1993

Extinct genus of frogs

Estesina is an extinct genus of frogs. The genus was named in honour of Richard Estes, who died in 1990.

== See also ==
- Prehistoric amphibian
- List of prehistoric amphibians
