= Gobiatoides =

Gobiatoides Temporal range: Late Cretaceous, 89.3–85.8 Ma

Scientific classification
- Kingdom: Animalia
- Phylum: Chordata
- Class: Amphibia
- Order: Anura
- Family: †Gobiatidae
- Genus: †Gobiatoides; Roček and Nessov, 1993

Type species
- †Gobiatoides parvus Roček and Nessov, 1993

Extinct genus of amphibians

Gobiatoides is an extinct genus of prehistoric gobiatid frog from Uzbekistan. The only known species is Gobiatoides parvus.

== See also ==
- Prehistoric amphibian
- List of prehistoric amphibians
