= Theatonius =

Theatonius Temporal range: Upper Cretaceous, 70.6–66.043 Ma

Scientific classification
- Kingdom: Animalia
- Phylum: Chordata
- Class: Amphibia
- Order: Anura
- Genus: †Theatonius; Fox, 1976

Type species
- †Theatonius lancensis Fox, 1976

Extinct genus of amphibians

Theatonius is an extinct genus of Cretaceous amphibians known from North America. Originally described from the Lance Formation, Wyoming, it is now also known from Utah, Montana, and New Jersey.

== See also ==
- Prehistoric amphibian
- List of prehistoric amphibians
