= Horezmia =

Scientific classification
- Domain: Eukaryota
- Kingdom: Animalia
- Phylum: Chordata
- Class: Amphibia
- Clade: Caudata
- Genus: †Horezmia; Nessov, 1981

Extinct genus of amphibians

Horezmia is an extinct genus of Mesozoic salamanders. The fossils have been found in Russia. It is comparable to modern advanced salamanders, though its phylogenetic placement within Salamandroidea is uncertain.

== See also ==
- Prehistoric amphibian
- List of prehistoric amphibians
