= Cretasalia =

Cretasalia Temporal range: Late Cretaceous, 84.9–66.043 Ma

Scientific classification
- Domain: Eukaryota
- Kingdom: Animalia
- Phylum: Chordata
- Class: Amphibia
- Order: Anura
- Family: †Gobiatidae
- Genus: †Cretasalia; Gubin, 1999

Type species
- †Cretasalia tsybini Gubin, 1999

Extinct genus of amphibians

Cretasalia is an extinct genus of prehistoric frogs from Mongolia.

== See also ==
- Prehistoric amphibian
- List of prehistoric amphibians
