= Kizylkuma =

Kizylkuma Temporal range: Early Cretaceous, 94.3–89.3 Ma

Scientific classification
- Kingdom: Animalia
- Phylum: Chordata
- Class: Amphibia
- Order: Anura
- Family: Alytidae
- Genus: †Kizylkuma; Nessov, 1981

Type species
- † Kizylkuma antiqua Nessov, 1981

Extinct genus of frogs

Kizylkuma is an extinct genus of frog in the family Alytidae (=Discoglossidae). Its fossils have been found in the Bissekty Formation (Uzbekistan).

== See also ==
- Prehistoric amphibian
- List of prehistoric amphibians
