= Proamphiuma =

Proamphiuma Temporal range: Maastrichtian-Lancian ~70–63 Ma

Scientific classification
- Kingdom: Animalia
- Phylum: Chordata
- Class: Amphibia
- Order: Urodela
- Family: Amphiumidae
- Genus: †Proamphiuma; Estes, 1969
- Species: †P. cretacea

Binomial name
- †Proamphiuma cretacea Estes, 1969

Extinct genus of salamanders

Proamphiuma is an extinct genus of prehistoric amphibian found in the Bug Creek Anthills in the Hell Creek Formation.

== See also ==
- Prehistoric amphibian
- List of prehistoric amphibians
