= Altanulia =

Altanulia Temporal range: Early Cretaceous, 99.6–65.5 Ma

Scientific classification
- Kingdom: Animalia
- Phylum: Chordata
- Class: Amphibia
- Order: Anura
- Genus: †Altanulia; Gubin, 1993

Type species
- † Altanulia alifanovi Gubin, 1993

Extinct genus of frogs

Altanulia is an extinct genus of frogs.

== Description ==
The holotype of Altanulia - PIN 553/300 -, consisting of an isolated 20 mm long maxilla bearing 45-47 teeth, was found by the Soviet-Mongolian Paleontological Expedition in the southern Gobi Desert, Nemegt Formation, and dates from the Upper Cretaceous (Upper Campanian-Lower Maastrichtian). Altanulia was diagnosed on the basis in the "Posterior part of maxilla deep, with longitudinal wedge-shaped labial depression; pterygoid tubercle of maxilla well expressed; frontal process in anterior part of bone."

== Classification ==
Altanulia belongs to the Discoglossidae, due to the shape and structure of the lingual surface of its maxilla.

== See also ==
- Prehistoric amphibian
- List of prehistoric amphibians
