= Spondylophryne =

Scientific classification
- Kingdom: Animalia
- Phylum: Chordata
- Class: Amphibia
- Order: Anura
- Family: Alytidae?
- Genus: Spondylophryne Kretzoi, 1956

Synonyms
- Spondylophrys villanyensis – Jánossy, 2011

Genus of amphibians

Spondylophryne villanyensis is a name given to a prehistoric amphibian placed in the family Discoglossidae (=Alytidae). It was described based on material from Villány, Hungary. Later studies have criticized the extreme brevity of the description and lack of illustration; the name could be considered a nomen nudum.

== Description ==
The species description appears to comprise one sentence:

"Spondylophryne villanyensis n. g., n. sp.– Altertümlicher Typus von Baranophrys-Grösse, mit im Neuralbogen isoliertem erstem Wirbel im Urostyl".

== See also ==
- Prehistoric amphibian
- List of prehistoric amphibians
