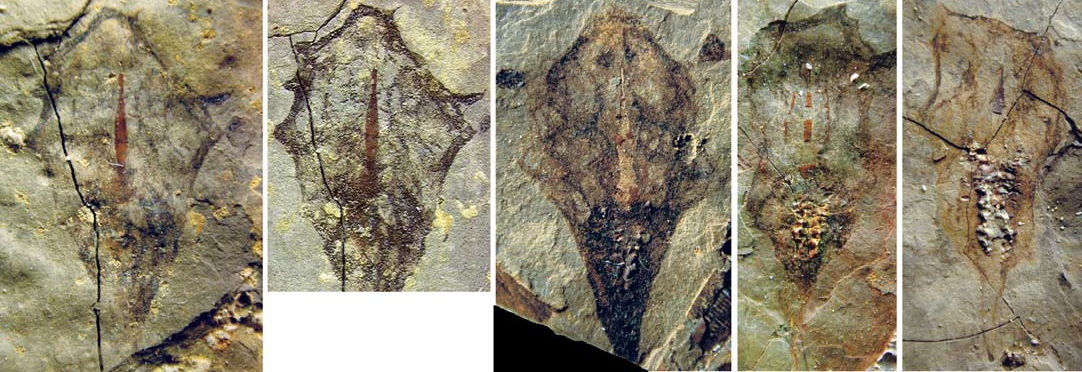

Scientific classification
- Domain: Eukaryota
- Kingdom: Animalia
- Phylum: Chordata
- Class: Amphibia
- Order: Anura
- Clade: Pipimorpha
- Genus: †Shomronella; Estes et al., 1978
- Species: †S. jordanica

Binomial name
- †Shomronella jordanica Estes et al., 1978

= Shomronella =

Shomronella Temporal range: Lower Cretaceous, 136.4–125.0 Ma

Extinct genus of amphibians

Shomronella jordanica is the only species in the extinct genus Shomronella, a genus of prehistoric frogs. According to findings from fossils of S. jordanica, that were found in Jordan and Israel, the frog lived during the Lower Cretaceous, specifically in the Hauterivian to Barremian.

== See also ==
- Pipimorpha
- List of prehistoric amphibians
