= Eoxenopoides =

Eoxenopoides Temporal range: Maastrichtian–Selandian, 70.6–58.7 Ma

Scientific classification
- Domain: Eukaryota
- Kingdom: Animalia
- Phylum: Chordata
- Class: Amphibia
- Order: Anura
- Family: Pipidae
- Genus: †Eoxenopoides; Haughton, 1931

Type species
- † Eoxenopoides reuningi Haughton, 1931

Extinct genus of amphibians

Eoxenopoides is an extinct genus of prehistoric frogs. It is known from Banke, a Maastrichtian/Selandian crater lake mudstone in South Africa.

== See also ==
- Prehistoric amphibian
- List of prehistoric amphibians
