= Lithobatrachus =

Lithobatrachus Temporal range: Oligocene, 28.4–23.03 Ma

Scientific classification
- Kingdom: Animalia
- Phylum: Chordata
- Class: Amphibia
- Order: Anura
- Genus: †Lithobatrachus; Parker, 1929

Type species
- †Hyla europaea Noble, 1928

Extinct genus of amphibians

Lithobatrachus is an extinct genus of prehistoric amphibian. It was described in 1929 by Hampton Wildman Parker based on a poorly preserved specimen that was first described as Hyla europaea by Gladwyn Kingsley Noble the year before. The two engaged in a debate whether the new genus was warranted. It might belong to the family Palaeobatrachidae, but this remains ambiguous.

== See also ==
- Prehistoric amphibian
- List of prehistoric amphibians
