= Scotiophryne =

Scotiophryne Temporal range: Early Cretaceous–Early Paleocene ~125–60.5 Ma

Scientific classification
- Domain: Eukaryota
- Kingdom: Animalia
- Phylum: Chordata
- Class: Amphibia
- Order: Anura
- Genus: †Scotiophryne; Estes, 1969

Type species
- † Scotiophryne pustulosa Estes 1969

Synonyms
- Scotiphryne (lapsus)

Genus of prehistoric amphibians

Scotiophryne is an extinct genus of prehistoric amphibian.

== See also ==
- Prehistoric amphibian
- List of prehistoric amphibians
