= Komatosuchus =

Komatosuchus Temporal range: Triassic, 251.3–247.2 Ma

Scientific classification
- Kingdom: Animalia
- Phylum: Chordata
- Clade: Tetrapoda
- Order: †Temnospondyli
- Family: †Micromelerpetontidae
- Genus: †Komatosuchus; Novikov and Shishkin, 1992

Extinct genus of amphibians

Komatosuchus is an extinct genus of temnospondyl within the family Micromelerpetontidae.

== See also ==
- Prehistoric amphibian
- List of prehistoric amphibians
