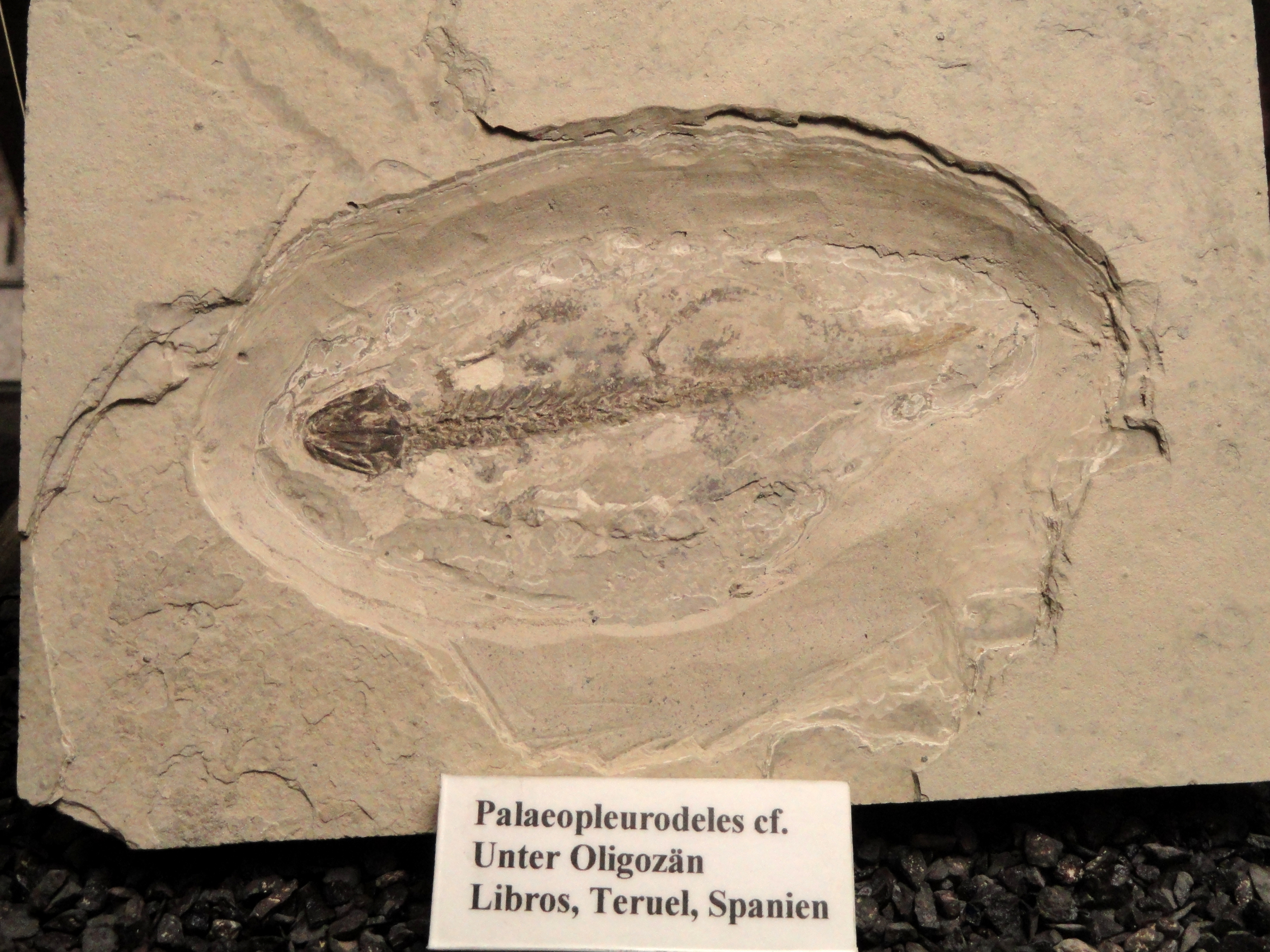

Scientific classification
- Domain: Eukaryota
- Kingdom: Animalia
- Phylum: Chordata
- Class: Amphibia
- Order: Urodela
- Family: Salamandridae
- Subfamily: Pleurodelinae
- Genus: †Palaeopleurodeles; Herre, 1941

Type species
- Palaeopleurodeles hauffi Herre, 1941

= Palaeopleurodeles =

Palaeopleurodeles Temporal range: Middle Miocene, 17–15 Ma

Extinct genus of amphibians

Palaeopleurodeles is an extinct genus of prehistoric amphibian.

== See also ==
- Prehistoric amphibian
- List of prehistoric amphibians
