= Miopelobates =

Scientific classification
- Domain: Eukaryota
- Kingdom: Animalia
- Phylum: Chordata
- Class: Amphibia
- Order: Anura
- Family: Pelobatidae
- Genus: †Miopelobates; Wettstein-Westersheimb, 1955

Extinct genus of amphibians

Miopelobates is an extinct genus of prehistoric frogs in the family Pelobatidae.

== See also ==
- Prehistoric amphibian
- List of prehistoric amphibians
