= Oligosemia =

Oligosemia Temporal range: Miocene, 11.1–8.7 Ma

Scientific classification
- Domain: Eukaryota
- Kingdom: Animalia
- Phylum: Chordata
- Class: Amphibia
- Order: Urodela
- Family: Salamandridae
- Genus: †Oligosemia; Longinos Navás, 1922

Type species
- Oligosemia spinosa Longinos Navás, 1922

Extinct genus of amphibians

Oligosemia is an extinct genus of prehistoric salamanders. Only one species is known, Oligosemia spinosa from Libros, Spain.

== See also ==
- Prehistoric amphibian
- List of prehistoric amphibians
