= Baranophrys =

Baranophrys Temporal range: Pleistocene, 2.588–0.781 Ma

Scientific classification (disputed)
- Kingdom: Animalia
- Phylum: Chordata
- Class: Amphibia
- Genus: †Baranophrys; Kretzoi, 1956

Type species
- † Baranophrys discoglossoides Kretzoi, 1956

Extinct genus of frogs

Baranophrys is an extinct genus of frogs of questionable taxonomic status. It is known from Villány, Hungary.

== See also ==
- Prehistoric amphibian
- List of prehistoric amphibians
