= Richard Estes (paleoherpetologist) =

American paleontologist (1932–1990)

Richard Dean Estes (1932-1990) was a paleoherpetologist, specializing in the evolution of extinct salamanders.

He was awarded the Romer-Simpson Medal in 1990 by the Society of Vertebrate Paleontology and served as an editor for the Journal of Vertebrate Paleontology.

== Legacy ==
The taxa Estesia, Estesina, and Richardoestesia are all named in honour of Estes.
