= Paradiscoglossus =

Paradiscoglossus Temporal range: Late Cretaceous, 70.6–66.043 Ma

Scientific classification
- Domain: Eukaryota
- Kingdom: Animalia
- Phylum: Chordata
- Class: Amphibia
- Order: Anura
- Genus: †Paradiscoglossus; Estes & Sanchíz, 1982

Type species
- †Paradiscoglossus americanus Estes & Sanchíz, 1982

Extinct genus of amphibians

Paradiscoglossus is an extinct genus of prehistoric amphibian. It is known from fossils from the United States (Wyoming), Romania, and Spain.

== See also ==
- Prehistoric amphibian
- List of prehistoric amphibians
