= Wealdenbatrachus =

Wealdenbatrachus Temporal range: Early Cretaceous, 130.0–125.45 Ma

Scientific classification
- Kingdom: Animalia
- Phylum: Chordata
- Class: Amphibia
- Order: Anura
- Genus: †Wealdenbatrachus; Fey, 1988

Extinct genus of amphibians

Wealdenbatrachus is an extinct genus of prehistoric frog known from the Lower Cretaceous of Uña, Spain, which is part of the La Huérguina Formation Its anatomy and relationships have recently been revisited, finding that this frog might be a proficient jumper, and that it was a primitive frog close to the ancestry of all modern frogs.

== See also ==
- Prehistoric amphibian
- List of prehistoric amphibians
