= Icanosaurus =

Scientific classification
- Kingdom: Animalia
- Phylum: Chordata
- Clade: Tetrapoda
- Order: †Temnospondyli
- Suborder: †Stereospondyli
- Family: †Trematosauridae
- Genus: †Icanosaurus; Rusconi, 1951

Type species
- †I. rectifrons Rusconi, 1951

Extinct genus of amphibians

Icanosaurus is an extinct genus of trematosaurian temnospondyl within the family Trematosauridae.

== Bibliography ==
- Rusconi, C. 1951. Laberintodontes triásicos y pérmicos de Mendoza. Revista del Museo de Historia Natural de Mendoza 5:33-158.

== See also ==
- Prehistoric amphibian
- List of prehistoric amphibians
