= Saevesoederberghia =

Scientific classification
- Kingdom: Animalia
- Phylum: Chordata
- Class: Amphibia
- Genus: †Saevesoederberghia; Ročec & Nessov, 1993

Type species
- †Saevesoederberghia egredia Ročec & Nessov, 1993

Extinct genus of frogs

Saevesoederberghia is an extinct genus of frogs.

== See also ==
- Prehistoric amphibian
- List of prehistoric amphibians
