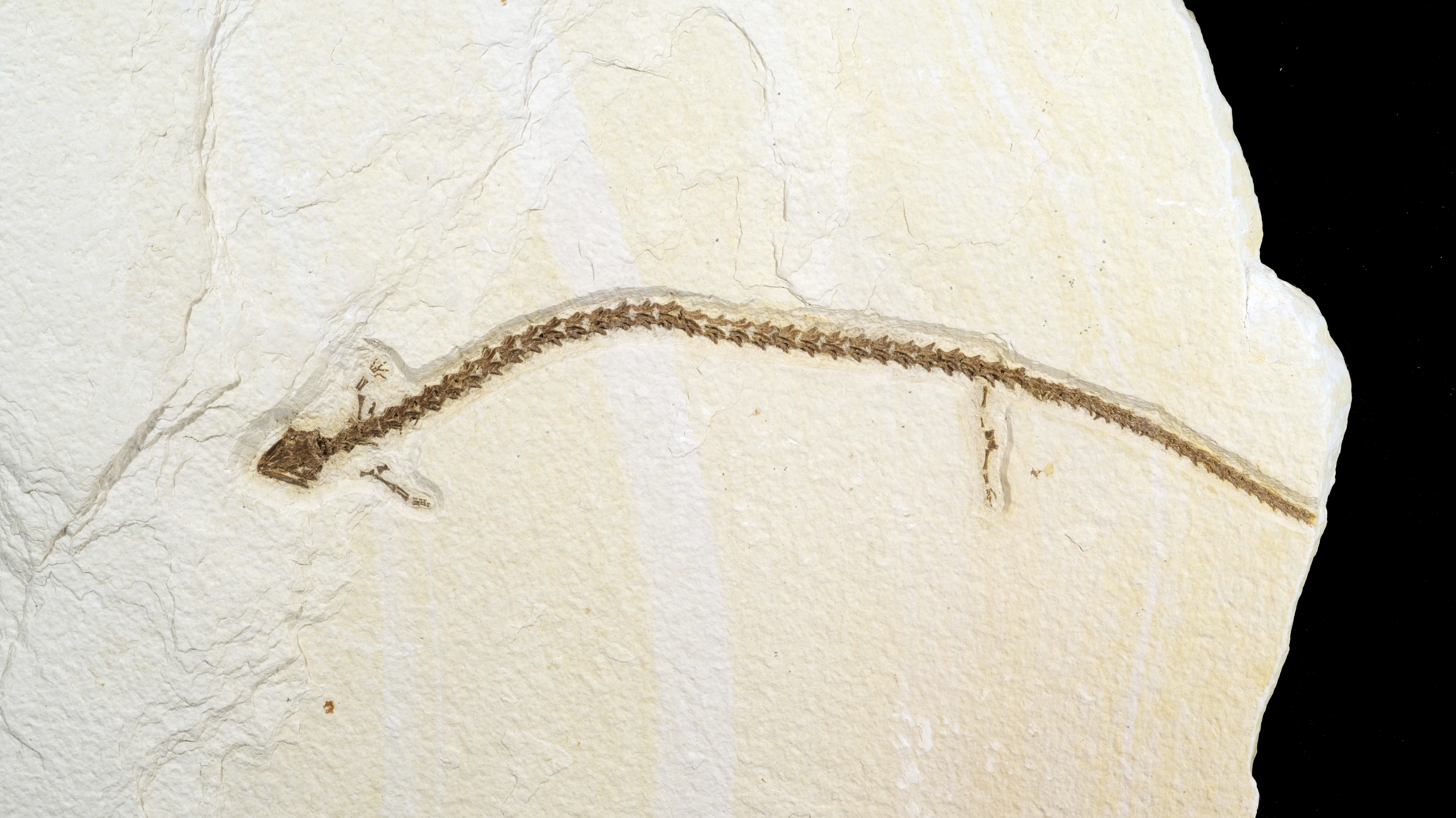

Scientific classification
- Kingdom: Animalia
- Phylum: Chordata
- Class: Amphibia
- Order: Urodela
- Genus: †Paleoamphiuma; Rieppel and Grande, 1998

Type species
- †Paleoamphiuma tetradactylum Rieppel and Grande, 1998

= Paleoamphiuma =

Paleoamphiuma Temporal range: Early Eocene, 55.5–50.5 Ma

Extinct genus of salamanders

Paleoamphiuma is an extinct genus of prehistoric salamanders known from the Green River Formation in Wyoming, the United States. It was initially classified within the family Amphiumidae, but Gardner (2003) suggested that it be better placed within the family Sirenidae. The single known specimen measures 39 cm in length. It was named in reference to the extant salamander Amphiuma.

== See also ==
- Prehistoric amphibian
- List of prehistoric amphibians
