= Procynops =

Procynops Temporal range: Middle Miocene, 15.97–11.61 Ma
- Fossil specimen of P. miocenicus, Shanghai Natural History Museum

Scientific classification
- Kingdom: Animalia
- Phylum: Chordata
- Class: Amphibia
- Order: Urodela
- Family: Salamandridae
- Subfamily: Pleurodelinae
- Genus: †Procynops; Young, 1965

Type species
- † Procynops miocenicus Young, 1965

Extinct genus of amphibians

Procynops is an extinct genus of prehistoric amphibian.

== See also ==
- Prehistoric amphibian
- List of prehistoric amphibians
