= Itemirella =

Itemirella Temporal range: Late Cretaceous, 94.3–89.3 Ma

Scientific classification
- Kingdom: Animalia
- Phylum: Chordata
- Class: Amphibia
- Order: Anura
- Genus: †Itemirella; Nessov, 1981

Type species
- Itemirella cretacea Nessov, 1981

Extinct genus of amphibians

Itemirella is an extinct genus of prehistoric anuran of the Bissekty Formation, Uzbekistan.

== See also ==
- Prehistoric amphibian
- List of prehistoric amphibians
