= Callobatrachus =

Callobatrachus Temporal range: Early Cretaceous, 125 Ma
- C. sanyanensis, Chaoyang Paleontological Museum

Scientific classification
- Kingdom: Animalia
- Phylum: Chordata
- Class: Amphibia
- Order: Anura
- Family: Discoglossidae
- Genus: †Callobatrachus; Wang & Gao, 1999
- Species: †C. sanyanensis

Binomial name
- †Callobatrachus sanyanensis Wang & Gao, 1999

Extinct genus of frogs

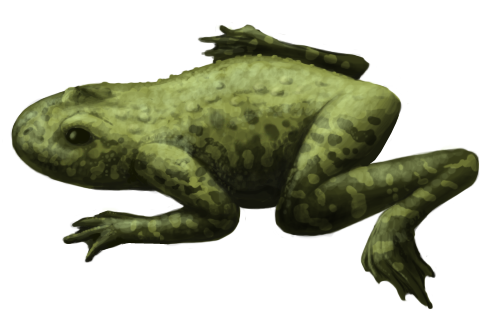
Life restoration

Callobatrachus is an extinct genus of frog from the Early Cretaceous-age Yixian Formation of Liaoning, China. It was described in 1999 by K. Gao of the American Museum of Natural History and Y. Wang of the Chinese Academy of Sciences. It was discovered in the Sihetun locality of the western part of Liaoning province.

As frogs are rarely found as articulated skeletons in the fossil record, the discovery of this new taxon has provided important insight into anuran evolution.

The holotype, IVPP V11525, is known from a nearly complete skeleton exposed in a dorsal view on a shale slab. Its total body length (from snout to vent) is estimated at 94 mm. It differs morphologically in many respects from all other discoglossids, including the number of presacral vertebrae (9 instead of the usual 8) and other primitive characters. Although it had a mosaic of primitive and derived characters, it can be unequivocally placed as the most basal taxon of the clade. This shows that the taxon diverged early from the stem and evolved separately as a distinct lineage by the Early Cretaceous in East Asia.

The skull is described as being short and wide and is well preserved. The maxillary region is less well-preserved but it can be determined that each premaxilla bears 18-20 slender and conical teeth, and the maxilla bears approximately 40-50 fine pedicellate teeth. The vertebral column consists of nine presacral vertebrae, a single sacral vertebra, and a free urostyle. Three pairs of ribs were found associated with presacrals II-IV. The hind limbs are remarkably well-preserved and are slenderly built, with an approximate total length of 116 mm. Its hind feet have the phalangeal formula 2-2-3-4-3, with its fourth digit being the longest at 27 mm.

Before its description, Callobatrachus was announced in Chinese media as "sanyanlichan".

While some authors have suggested Callobatrachus is a synonym of Liaobatrachus, this has been rejected by other authors. While originally suggested to be a "discoglossid", in a 2017 phylogenetic analysis it was found to be a crown group frog which was more derived than Ascaphus and Leiopelma, but less so than alytids and more advanced frogs.

== See also ==
- List of prehistoric amphibians
