= Monsechobatrachus =

Monsechobatrachus Temporal range: Barremian 130.0–125.45 Ma

Scientific classification
- Domain: Eukaryota
- Kingdom: Animalia
- Phylum: Chordata
- Class: Amphibia
- Order: Anura
- Suborder: Neobatrachia
- Genus: †Monsechobatrachus; Fejérváry, 1921

Synonyms
- Montsechobatrachus – unjustified emendation

Extinct genus of amphibians

Monsechobatrachus is an extinct genus of prehistoric frogs. It is known from a complete but very poorly preserved skeleton from Monsech in Spain.

== See also ==
- Prehistoric amphibian
- List of prehistoric amphibians
