= Prosiren =

Prosiren Temporal range: Cretaceous, 112.6–99.6 Ma

Scientific classification
- Kingdom: Animalia
- Phylum: Chordata
- Class: Amphibia
- Family: †Prosirenidae; Estes, 1969
- Genus: †Prosiren; Goin & Auffenberg, 1958

Type species
- Prosiren elinorae Goin & Auffenberg, 1958

Extinct genus of salamanders

Prosiren is an extinct genus of salamanders in the family Prosirenidae. It was originally placed in the family Sirenidae.

== See also ==
- Prehistoric amphibian
- List of prehistoric amphibians
