= Koalliella =

Koalliella Temporal range: Late Cretaceous-Paleocene, 78.9–55.8 Ma

Scientific classification
- Kingdom: Animalia
- Phylum: Chordata
- Class: Amphibia
- Order: Urodela
- Family: Salamandridae
- Genus: †Koalliella; Herre, 1950

Type species
- Koalliella genzeli Herre, 1950

Extinct genus of amphibians

Koalliella is an extinct genus of prehistoric salamander. It is the oldest known salamandrid.

== See also ==
- Prehistoric amphibian
- List of prehistoric amphibians
