= Zaphrissa =

Zaphrissa Temporal range: Oligocene, 28.4–23.0 Ma

Scientific classification
- Kingdom: Animalia
- Phylum: Chordata
- Class: Amphibia
- Order: Anura
- Family: Alytidae
- Genus: †Zaphrissa; Cope, 1866

Type species
- Zaphrissa eurypelis Cope, 1866

Extinct genus of amphibians

Zaphrissa is an extinct genus of prehistoric amphibian which contains one species, Zaphrissa eurypelis, known from the Oligocene of Rott in Siebengebirge, Germany.

== See also ==
- Prehistoric amphibian
- List of prehistoric amphibians
