= Gobiops =

Gobiops Temporal range: Middle Jurassic–Upper Jurassic

Scientific classification
- Domain: Eukaryota
- Kingdom: Animalia
- Phylum: Chordata
- Order: †Temnospondyli
- Suborder: †Stereospondyli
- Family: †Brachyopidae
- Genus: †Gobiops; Shishkin, 1991

Type species
- †Gobiops desertus Shishkin, 1991

Synonyms
- Ferganobatrachus riabinini Nesov, 1990

Extinct genus of amphibians

Gobiops is an extinct genus of temnospondyl from the Jurassic of Mongolia, China, and possibly Kyrgyzstan. The genus is represented by a single species, Gobiops desertus. It was named in 1991 from the Late Jurassic Shar Teeg Beds of Mongolia. Additional material was described in 2005 from the Middle Jurassic Toutunhe Formation in the Junggar Basin of China. Gobiops belongs to the family Brachyopidae. The poorly known genus Ferganobatrachus, named in 1990 from Shar Teeg, is probably synonymous with Gobiops.
