= Syphonodon =

Scientific classification
- Domain: Eukaryota
- Kingdom: Animalia
- Phylum: Chordata
- Class: Amphibia
- Genus: †Syphonodon; Seeley, 1908

Type species
- †Syphonodon thecomastodon Seeley, 1908

Extinct genus of temnospondyls

Syphonodon is an extinct genus of temnospondyls.
