= Dictyocephalus =

Dictyocephalus Temporal range: Late Triassic

Scientific classification
- Kingdom: Animalia
- Phylum: Chordata
- Class: Amphibia
- Order: †Temnospondyli
- Genus: †Dictyocephalus Leidy, 1857
- Species: †D. elegans

Binomial name
- †Dictyocephalus elegans

Extinct genus of amphibians

Dictyocephalus is an extinct genus of prehistoric temnospondyls; the only species is Dictyocephalus elegans. This taxon was one of the first metoposaurids to be discovered in North America, being discovered by Ebenezer Emmons and briefly described by Joseph Leidy in 1856 in the Newark supergroup exposures of Chatham County, North Carolina. At the time, Leidy was uncertain of much of the anatomy of D. elegans, which is represented only by a small partial skull (now housed at the American Museum of Natural History) and made only brief descriptions and measurements of a few elements, with an estimated size based on the long-snouted trematosaur Trematosaurus. Emmons provided the first figures of the specimen the following year. Romer (1947) briefly mentioned that the specimen was indistinguishable from "Buettneria" (Koskinonodon).

The taxon was not revisited in much detail until the revision of the Metoposauridae by Ned Colbert and John Imbrie in 1956. These authors said that many of the features listed by Leidy to be diagnostic for D. elegans (e.g., parietals comparatively short) were too generic to either make comparisons or to prove its specific affinities. Chowdhury (1965) did not formally place D. elegans within the Metoposauridae. Subsequent authors proposed that D. elegans might represent a juvenile of a specific taxon, but uncertainty resulted from interpretations of the absence an otic notch and a tabular horn, features seen in larger metoposaurids. Joseph Gregory suggested that it specifically represented a juvenile of Metoposaurus but indicated a preference to maintain the name in a form restricted to the holotype and to designate it as a nomen vanum. Beth Davidow-Henry re-appraised the holotype in light of new material of small metoposaurids. She said that if the absence of otic notches was considered to be a defining feature, then D. elegans would probably be synonymous with Anaschisma from Wyoming, but refrained from formalizing this in the absence of information regarding changes to the otic notch during development. Dictyocephalus was thus maintained as a valid genus of metoposaurids with shallow otic notches. The most recent revision of the metoposaurids by Adrian Hunt stated that the holotype was too fragmentary to be diagnostic and designated D. elegans as a nomen dubium within Temnospondyli
