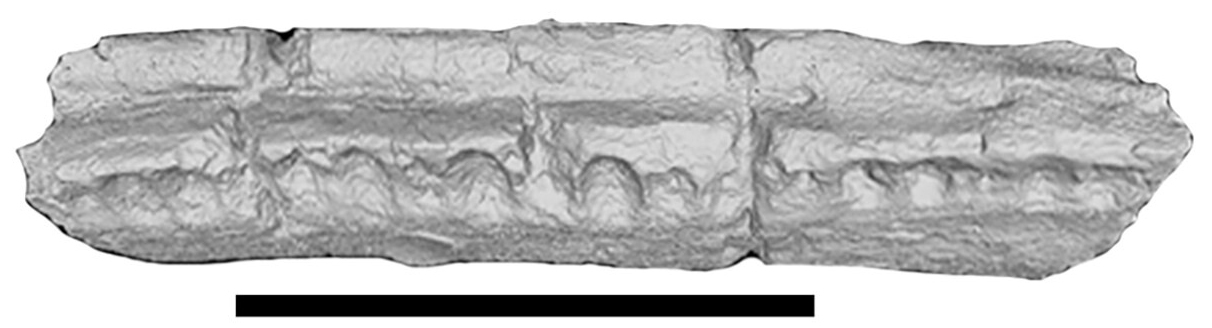
- Holotype dentary

Scientific classification
- Kingdom: Animalia
- Phylum: Chordata
- Clade: Tetrapoda
- Order: †Temnospondyli
- Family: †Brachiopoidea
- Genus: †Austropelor; Longman, 1941

Type species
- †Austropelor wadleyi Longman, 1941

= Austropelor =

Austropelor Temporal range: Late Triassic (Norian) ~227.3–205.7 Ma

Extinct genus of amphibians

Austropelor is an extinct genus of possible chigutisaurid temnospondyl from the Late Triassic (Norian stage) of Australia. Fossil remains were found in the Marburg Sandstone Formation.

== Description ==
The Austropelor holotype consists of three conjoined pieces (-100 mm) with alveoli lacking teeth, representing a segment of a left mandibular ramus with clear amphibian characters. Affinities of the genus indicate a relationship with brachyopoids as well as, possibly, with Metoposaurs.

== History ==
Austropelor was originally described from part of a right maxilla, yet the holotype, No. F2628, seems more likely to be a left amphibian mandible. This genus was controversial at the time of the original description, as it was the only Jurassic labyrinthodont known until the description of Siderops. After the original paper, the Marburg Sandstone Formation was regarded as of Late Triassic age, with the overlying Walloon Coal Measures of possible lower Jurassic age. Yet was later interpreted as Lower Jurassic in age, likely "Middle Liassic" (=Pliensbachian).
