= Arkanserpeton =

Arkanserpeton Temporal range: Pennsylvanian

Scientific classification
- Kingdom: Animalia
- Phylum: Chordata
- Clade: Tetrapoda
- Order: †Temnospondyli
- Family: †Dissorophidae
- Genus: †Arkanserpeton; Lane, 1932

Type species
- †Arkanserpeton arcuatum Lane, 1932

Extinct genus of amphibians

Arkanserpeton is an extinct genus of dissorophoid temnospondyl represented by a fragmentary isolated femur and an isolated neural arch. The specimens were reported from a semianthracite coal bed from the Paris Shale. The names Paris Shale and Fort Smith Formation were abandoned, and the rocks that make up this section were placed in the Savanna Formation. It is not considered to be sufficiently diagnostic and was designated as a nomen dubium by Schoch & Milner (2014).

== History of study ==
The holotype, a partial femur, was reported from the Eureka Mine near Paris, Arkansas by Lane (1932), who compared it favorably to the dissorophid Aspidosaurus but who ultimately favored an embolomere affinity based on the known temporal ranges of various early tetrapod clades at the time. The approximately 6 cm-long femur was originally reported as number 1430 but is now registered as KUVP 5962. The taxon has been cursorily referenced in various studies and identified as a dissorophid in some, but it is presently regarded as a nomen dubium due to its poor preservation. Although Schoch & Milner (2014) reference a referred specimen (a neural arch from the type locality, KUVP 9973), this specimen was not referenced by previous workers, including Lane's original description.

== Anatomy ==
Lane's (1932) original description lists only a few features of the holotype. It measured 60 mm with the proximal end being missing (Schoch & Milner estimated a complete length of 65 mm), a maximum width of 19 mm across the distal end, and a slender shaft, bowed in one direction, with a triangular cross-section formed by a tall adductor crest that reaches its greatest height near the proximal end.
