= Prodiscoglossus =

Prodiscoglossus Temporal range: Oligocene, 33.9–28.4 Ma

Scientific classification
- Kingdom: Animalia
- Phylum: Chordata
- Class: Amphibia
- Order: Anura
- Family: Alytidae
- Genus: †Prodiscoglossus; Friant, 1944

Extinct genus of amphibians

Prodiscoglossus is an extinct genus of prehistoric frog in the family Alytidae, the painted frogs.
