= Ptychosphenodon =

Scientific classification
- Domain: Eukaryota
- Kingdom: Animalia
- Phylum: Chordata
- Order: †Temnospondyli
- Genus: †Ptychosphenodon; Seeley, 1907

Type species
- †P. browni Seeley, 1907

Extinct genus of temnospondyls

Ptychosphenodon is an extinct genus of temnospondyls.
