= Yizhoubatrachus =

Yizhoubatrachus Temporal range: Early Cretaceous, 125 Ma

Scientific classification
- Kingdom: Animalia
- Phylum: Chordata
- Class: Amphibia
- Order: Anura
- Genus: †Yizhoubatrachus; Gao & Chen, 2004

Type species
- Yizhoubatrachus macilentus Gao & Chen, 2004

Extinct genus of amphibians

Yizhoubatrachus is a genus of prehistoric frog from the Early Cretaceous of China. It contains only the species Y. macilentus.

== See also ==
- List of prehistoric amphibians
