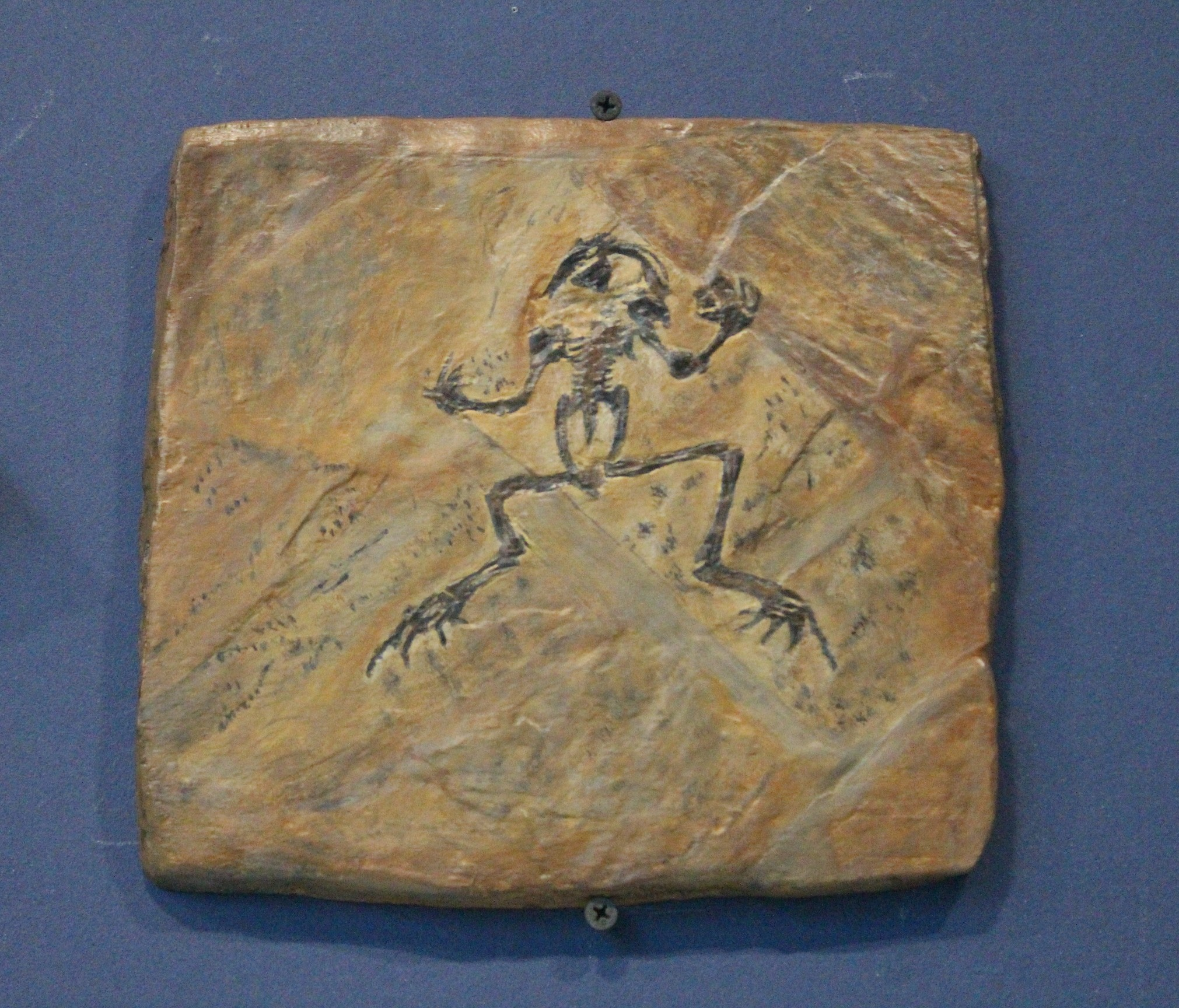
- M. beipiaoensis specimen at the Baoding Natural History Museum

Scientific classification
- Kingdom: Animalia
- Phylum: Chordata
- Class: Amphibia
- Order: Anura
- Genus: †Mesophryne; Gao & Wang, 2001

Type species
- †Mesophryne beipiaoensis Gao & Wang, 2001

= Mesophryne =

Extinct genus of amphibians

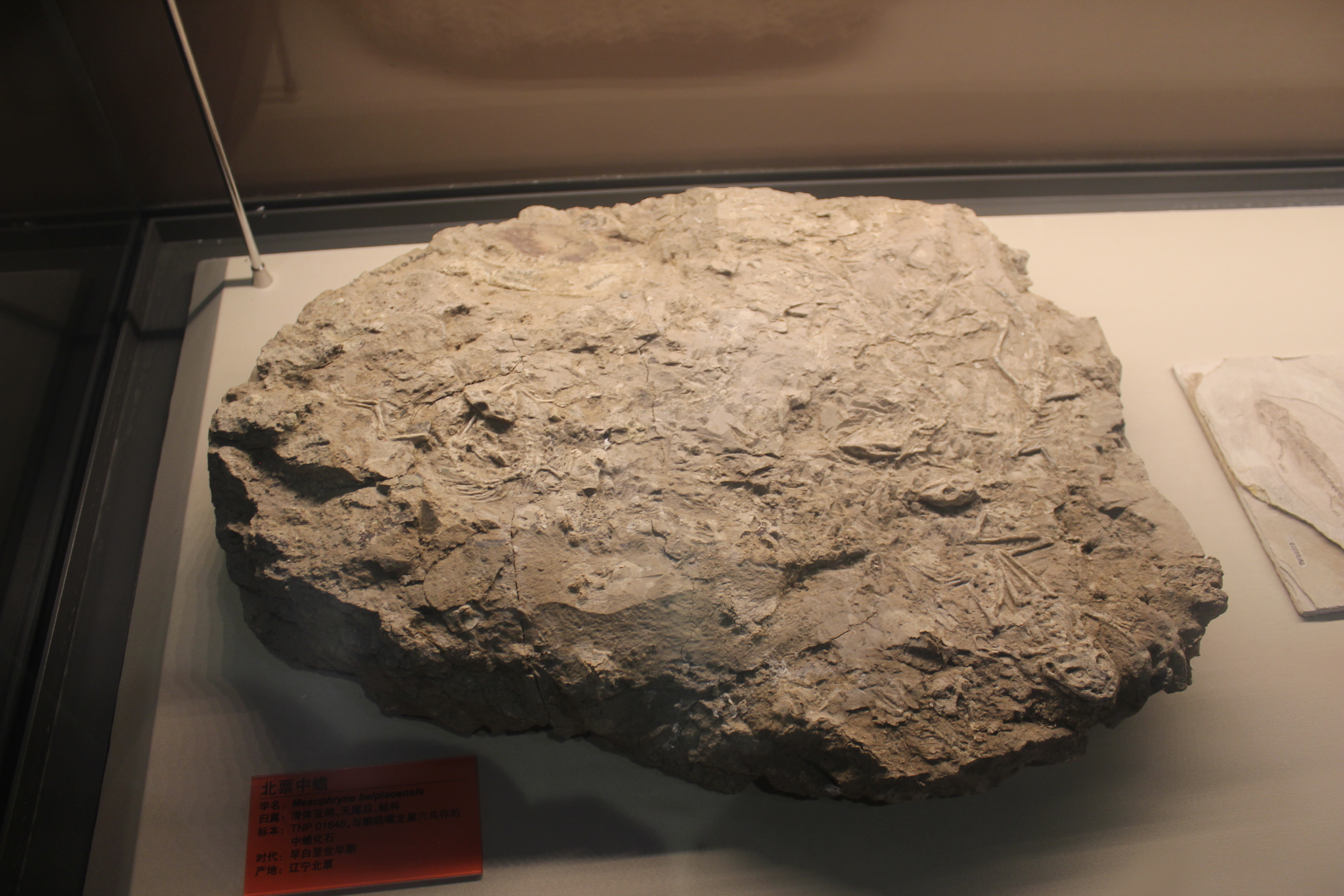
Block of M. beipiaoensis individuals, Tianjin Natural History Museum

Mesophryne beipiaoensis is an extinct species of frog, from the Cretaceous Yixian Formation of Liaoning (China), and the only species in the genus Mesophryne. It is known from several specimens collected near Heitizigou, 25 kilometres (16 mi) south of Beipiao, from which the specific epithet derives. The specimen has a snout–vent length of 69 millimetres (2.7 in).

While some authors have suggested Mesophryne is a synonym of Liaobatrachus, this has been rejected by other authors. Morphological measurements of these features were compared with extant relatives to produce a phylogenetic analysis suggesting that it is a crown group frog, which was more derived than Ascaphus and Leiopelma, but less so than alytids and other more advanced frogs.
