= Diadetognathus =

Scientific classification
- Domain: Eukaryota
- Kingdom: Animalia
- Phylum: Chordata
- Order: †Temnospondyli
- Suborder: †Stereospondyli
- Genus: †Diadetognathus; Miall, 1874

Extinct genus of temnospondyls

Diadetognathus is an extinct genus of temnospondyls.
