= Benthosphenus =

Benthosphenus Temporal range: 251.3–247.2 Ma

Scientific classification
- Domain: Eukaryota
- Kingdom: Animalia
- Phylum: Chordata
- Order: †Temnospondyli
- Suborder: †Stereospondyli
- Family: †Trematosauridae
- Genus: †Benthosphenus; Shishkin & Lozovsky, 1979

Extinct genus of temnospondyls

Benthosphenus is an extinct genus of temnospondyls. It has been found only at its type location on Russky Island, Russia, which is in a Smithian marine horizon.
