= Eugyrinus =

Scientific classification
- Kingdom: Animalia
- Phylum: Chordata
- Clade: Tetrapoda
- Order: †Temnospondyli
- Family: †Dendrerpetontidae
- Genus: †Eugyrinus; Watson, 1921

Type species
- †Eugyrinus wildi (Woodward, 1891)

Synonyms
- Hylonomus wildi Woodward, 1891

Extinct genus of amphibians

Eugyrinus is an extinct genus of dendrerpetontid temnospondyl. It was originally named Hylonomus wildi in 1891 by Arthur Smith Woodward.
