= Rastosuchus =

Rastosuchus Temporal range: Guadalupian–Lopingian

Scientific classification
- Kingdom: Animalia
- Phylum: Chordata
- Clade: Tetrapoda
- Order: †Temnospondyli
- Suborder: †Stereospondyli
- Family: †Rhinesuchidae
- Genus: †Rastosuchus; Dias et al., 2020
- Species: †R. hammeri

Binomial name
- †Rastosuchus hammeri Dias et al., 2020

Extinct genus of temnospondyls

Rastosuchus is an extinct genus of stereospondyl temnospondyl within the family Rhinesuchidae. It contains one species, Rastosuchus hammeri, found in the Permian Rio do Rasto Formation of Brazil.

== History of study ==
The name Rastosuchus hammeri was used as early as 1980 and then on several other instances, but because none of these usages formalized the name via a formal description, the name was considered to be a nomen nudum until formally described by Dias et al. (2020). Some of the material was also previously mentioned without nomenclatural assignment. A partial description of a nearly complete skull now assigned to this taxon was presented by Barberena & Dias (1998), and the phylogenetic position (as the "Serra do Cadeado short-snouted rhinesuchid") was assessed by Eltink et al. (2016). The holotype is a pair of lower jaws because this was the first material informally associated with the name. The genus name refers to the Rio do Rasto Formation, with the common suffix -suchus for 'crocodile.' The species name honors William R. Hammer, who is best known for his work on Gondwanan fossil tetrapods.

== Anatomy ==
In addition to the holotype and previously described complete skull, additional material includes fragmentary lower jaws and one partial postcranial skeleton including the pectoral girdle, hindlimb, vertebrae, and ribs. Specimens were collected from several localities and over a number of years. Based on the holotype, R. hammeri is diagnosed by many features, such as the presence of large teeth on all three coronoid bones, rather than denticles as in other rhinesuchids; a short symphysis; and various contacts between different mandibular bones.

== Phylogenetic position ==
Below is the topology recovered by Eltink et al. (2016):

- Temnospondyli
  - Dendrerpeton
  - - Eryops
    - - Trimerorhachis
      - Stereospondylomorpha
        - - Konzhukovia
          - Tryphosuchus
        - Stereospondyli
          - - - Lapillopsis
              - Peltobatrachus
            - - Lydekkerina
              - - Mastodonsaurus
                - Benthosuchus
          - Rhinesuchidae
            - Rhinesuchinae
              - Rhineceps
              - Rhinesuchus
            - - Uranocentrodon
              - Australerpetinae
                - - Broomistega
                  - - Australerpeton
                    - Rastosuchus (Serra do Cadeado short-snouted)
                - - - Laccosaurus
                    - - BP-1-4473
                      - - "Rhinesuchus" capensis
                        - Rhinesuchoides
