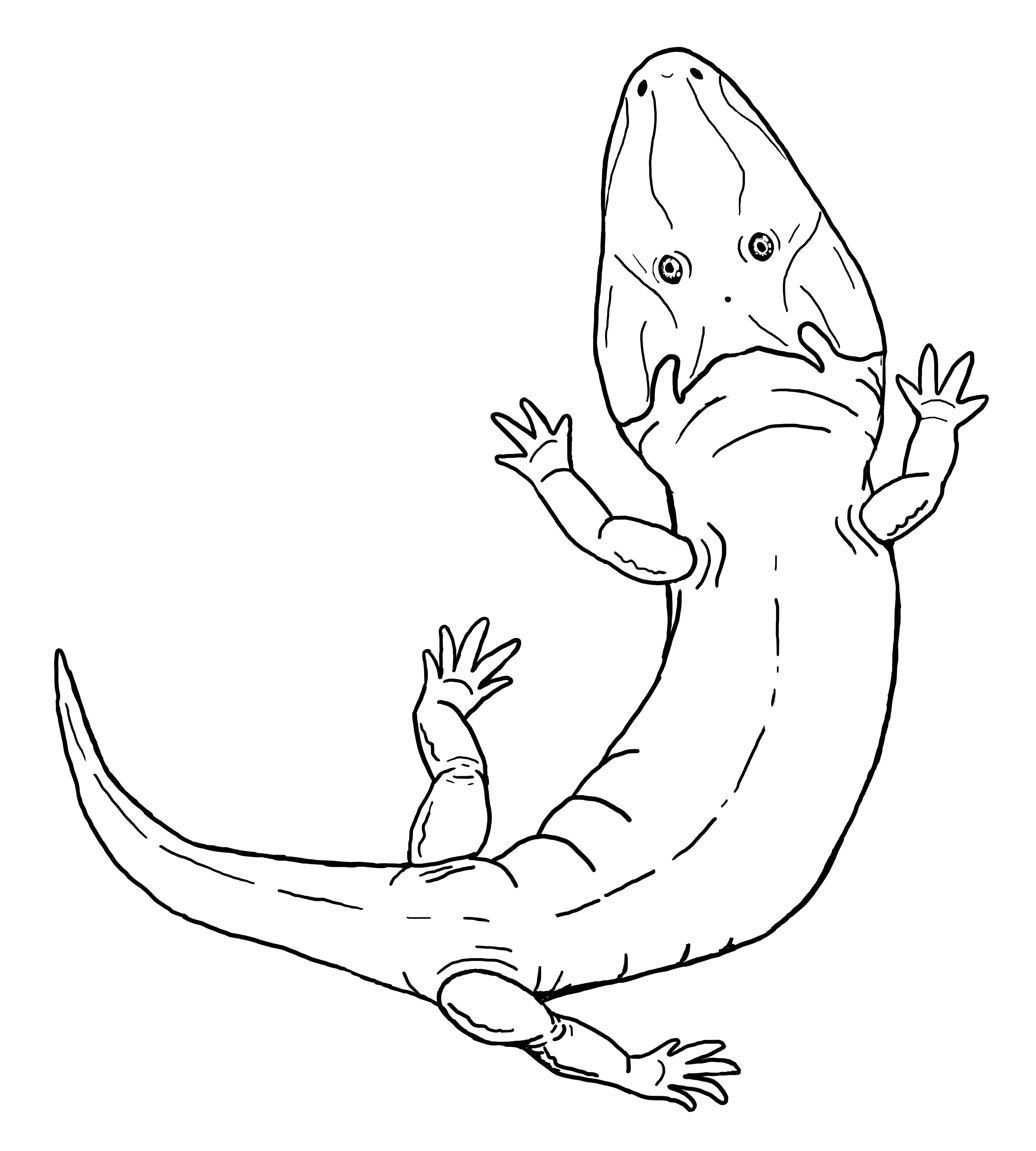
- Restoration

Scientific classification
- Kingdom: Animalia
- Phylum: Chordata
- Clade: Tetrapoda
- Order: †Temnospondyli
- Suborder: †Stereospondyli
- Family: †Rhinesuchidae
- Genus: †Rhineceps; Watson, 1962

Type species
- †Rhinesuchus nyasaensis (Haughton, 1927)

Other species
- †Rhineceps karibaensis Steyer & Sidor, 2025

= Rhineceps =

Rhineceps Temporal range: Lopingian

Extinct genus of temnospondyls

Rhineceps is an extinct genus of temnospondyl amphibian in the family Rhinesuchidae. Rhineceps was found in Northern Malawi (formerly Nyasaland) and Zambia in Southern Africa known from its type species R. nyasaensis and R. karibaensis. Rhineceps was a late Permian (256-258 Mya) semi-aquatic carnivore that lived in streams, rivers, lakes or lagoons. Rhineceps is an early divergent Stereopondyl within the family Rhinesuchidae, which only existed in the late Permian (Lopingian) and failed to survive the Permian-Triassic extinction unlike other stereospondyl families.

== History ==
Rhineceps was originally discovered in the "Upper Bone Beds" of the Chiweta Beds, North Waller Area in Northern Malawi. The fossil was first described and named by Haughton in 1926, whereby he described the fossil of a left mandibular ramus of R. nyasaensis as within the genus Rhinesuchus due to its similarity with the fossils of Rhinesuchus whaitsi. Watson later determined in a letter to Parrington that the original fossil was actually the anterior end of a right ramus and not a left ramus. Watson in 1962 described fossils newly found from the same locality collected by Parrington as fossils of R. nyasaensis and determined they were from the same individual. Watson also placed R. nyasaensis as part of a new genus Rhineceps that is distinct from other Rhinesuchus species. In 2025, Steyer & Sidor named a new species, R. karibaensis based on two nearly complete skulls from the Madumabisa Mudstone Formation of Zambia.

== Classification ==
Rhineceps belongs to the family Rhinesuchidae, which is within the clade Stereospondyli (a Temnospondyl clade). Until recently, both morphology, historical placement and phylogenetic analysis has placed Rhineceps as a sister group to Rhinesuchus within Rhinesuchinae, an early diverging group of Rhinesuchidae.

- Rhinesuchidae
  - Rhinesuchinae
    - Rhineceps
    - Rhinesuchus
      - Rhinesuchus broomianus
      - Rhinesuchus whaitsi
  - - Uranocentrodon senskalensis
    - Australerpetinae
      - - Broomistega putterelli
        - - Australerpeton
          - Serra de Cadeado short-snouted
      - - Laccosaurus watsoni
        - - BP-1-4473
          - - 'Rhinesuchus' capensis
            - Rhinesuchoides tenuiceps

In 2017, Marsicano et al. created a new phylogeny that places Rhineceps as a sister group to Uranocentrodon rather than within Rhinesuchinae (which is no longer a monophyletic group).

- Rhinesuchidae
  - Australerpeton
  - - Rhinesuchoides
      - Rhinesuchoides capensis
      - Rhinesuchoides tenuiceps
    - - - Rhineceps
        - Uranocentrodon
      - - Broomistega
        - - Rhinesuchus
          - Laccosaurus

This discrepancy in clearly describing phylogenetic relationships is likely due to the adaptive radiation of stereospondylomorphs that took place during the late Permian and early Triassic. Terrestrial temnospondyls were devastated during this period, caused by selective pressures for semi-aquatic or fully aquatic temnospondyls to acquire many new niches in a relatively short time period.

== Description and paleobiology ==
Rhineceps was a medium-sized, semi-aquatic, carnivorous, basal stereospondyl of the Lopingian of Malawi. They lived in fresh water bodies, including rivers lakes and lagoons, where they had diets mainly of fish. Stereospondyls were historically compared with contemporary crocodilians and giant salamanders due to their similar position as freshwater predators. However, they likely existed in a niche that is unique and independent from crocodilians and giant salamanders. These niche differences are inferred from cranial stress and structural patterns along with labyrinthodont dentition (labyrinthodonty refers to infolding of enamel and dentine within a tooth). The morphology of Rhineceps thus likely restricts its ability to hunt in specific ways that crocodilians and giant salamanders such as sweeping sideways bites. Rhineceps also used its unique morphology in service of catching prey, including its strong powerful bite and its palatal tooth row to grasp and hold fish in its jaw. Many temnospondyls including Rhineceps likely shared certain physiological characteristics with modern amphibians that cannot be directly observed in the fossil record. Rhineceps likely possessed heightened phenotypic plasticity among juvenile individuals like seen in modern amphibians. This plasticity allowed physiological changes during an organism's lifetime to alter its morphology during development to specific and different environmental factors experienced. Plasticity was a means for stereospondyls to adaptively radiate to many different species and niches. Rhineceps like other temnospondyls were ecological indicator species like modern amphibians, and thus likely were sensitive to chemical changes, UV radiation and other mutagens within its ecosystem.

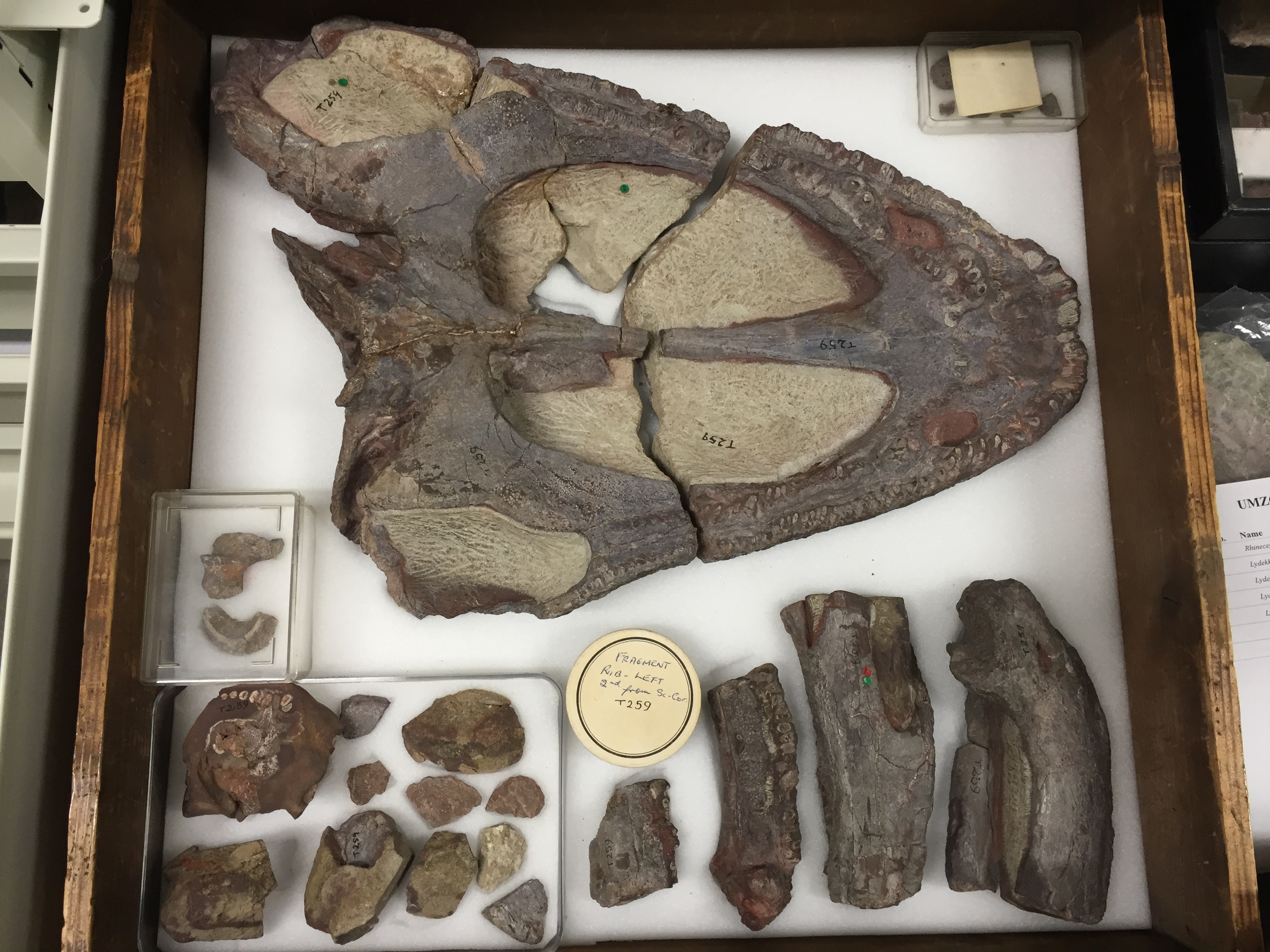
Fossils of the only known individual of Rhineceps nyasaensis.

Rhineceps like modern amphibians had obligatory aquatic young. Rhineceps like other stereospondyls was the result of evolutionary gigantism which resulted in stunted metamorphosis with few morphological differences between adults and larvae. Metamorphosis was likely lost in stereospondyls because extreme phenotypic plasticity allowed environmental acclimation through changes in morphology without needing a binary developmental life history with larval and adult stages. This eventually led to neoteny whereby the larval stage is morphologically very similar to the adult stage. Stereospondyls including Rhineceps only had gradual changes between juvenile and adult stages, and their fossils do not suggest the presence of any type of metamorphosis, major or minor. Greater ambiguity is created because stereospondyls including Rhineceps have traits traditionally associated with metamorphosis, including amphibious dermal pitting.

The presence of the types of gills in temnospondyls has largely been difficult to determine because conflicting interpretation of osteological evidence. Phylogenetic information has also created uncertainty of where external gills evolved and internal gills were lost. The evolutionary explanation for this contradiction known as Bystrow's Paradox is that temnospondyls had both internal gills and external gills, with external gills only present in larvae and internal gills that are homologous with Osteichthyes (bony fish) gills that later become modern amphibian gills. Thus, Rhineceps larvae likely had external gills and adult Rhineceps had internal gills, although this is difficult to confirm given the lack of evidence for metamorphosis in stereospondyls including Rhineceps.

Rhineceps as a temnospondyl, possesses diagnostic temnospondyl traits including wide vomers, large and round interpterygoid vacuities, otic notches, contact between post-pareital and exoccipital skull bones, and a stapes that articulates with the parasphenoid. Rhineceps fossils are differentiated from other rhinesuchids by the following traits "presence of a vomerine depression immediately anterior to cultriform process of the parasphenoid; ectopterygoids with enlarged tusks at their anterior end; transverse vomerine tooth row anteriorly convex; quadrate condyles projected behind the tip of the tabular horns; vomers with a continuous raised field of denticles; parasphenoid plate wider than long; well-developed transversely wide 'pockets'; internarial vacuity between nasals and premaxillae; mandible with two anterior meckelian foraminae; chordatympanic foramen located on the suture between the articular and the prearticular.".

== Geological and paleoenvironmental information ==
Rhineceps was found in the South African Karoo Supergroup, a group of sedimentary rocks that span from the Carboniferous period to the Jurassic period. These sedimentary layers were created from sediment shed from lakes and rivers near the Gondwanide mountains on the continent of Gondwana. Rhineceps was found in the "Upper Bone Beds" of the Chiweta beds in the North Waller Area in Northern Malawi, which is in South Central Africa. The sedimentary rocks from the Chiweta beds originated from mostly river sediments which often contain fossil bones surrounded by pedogenic carbonates. The lacustrine (lake derived) sediment does not contain bone, but instead contains pollen that were used to identify the age range of the Chiweta beds to be less than 263 Mya. The overlap of stratigraphic ranges of specific therapsid taxa place the Cistecephalus Assemblage Zone in the Chiweta beds (the zone where Rhineceps was found) within 256-258 Mya.

Rhineceps lived during the late Permian of northern Malawi 256-258 Mya. The ecosystems of Southern Africa were mainly tropical and were dominated by many rivers and river systems. Terrestrial ecosystems are dominated by Therapsids and river ecosystems are dominated by fishes and aquatic carnivorous temnospondyls. The late Permian is also characterized by reductions in biodiversity that limited the number of existing genera and species. Most groups of temnospondyls that existed terrestrially went extinct and consequently stereospondyls were the only temnospondyls to survive into the late Permian and early Triassic by adapting to a mostly or fully aquatic lifestyle. The ecosystems that Rhineceps lived in experienced significant ecological change causing dwindling biodiversity before the traditional date for the Permian-Triassic mass extinction event (252 Mya), likely caused by global cooling and growing glaciers at the end of the Guadalupian (end of middle Permian).

== See also ==
- List of prehistoric amphibians
