= 2020 in amphibian paleontology =

This list of fossil amphibians described in 2020 is a list of new taxa of fossil amphibians that were described during the year 2020, as well as other significant discoveries and events related to amphibian paleontology that occurred in 2020.

== New taxa ==
=== Temnospondyli ===
Name	Novelty	Status	Authors	Age	Type locality	Country	Notes	Images
Benthosuchus lukyanovi	Sp. nov	Valid	Morkovin	Early Triassic		Russia (Vologda Oblast)	A benthosuchid	
Diploseira	Gen. et comb. nov	Valid	Dilkes	Early Permian	Archer City Formation	United States (Texas)	A dissorophid temnospondyl; a new genus for "Dissorophus" angustus.	
Korkonterpeton	Gen. et sp. nov	Valid	Werneburg, Štamberg & Steyer	Permian (Asselian to Artinskian)	Prosečné	Czech Republic	A stereospondylomorph temnospondyl of uncertain phylogenetic placement. The type species is K. kalnense.	
Palodromeus	Gen. et sp. nov	Valid	Schoch, Henrici & Hook	Late Carboniferous	Allegheny Formation	United States (Ohio)	An olsoniform dissorophoid temnospondyl. Genus includes new species P. bairdi.	
Rastosuchus	Gen. et sp. nov	Valid	Dias, Dias-da-Silva & Schultz	Permian	Rio do Rasto Formation	Brazil	A rhinesuchid. The type species is R. hammeri.	

=== Allocaudata ===
Name	Novelty	Status	Authors	Age	Type locality	Country	Notes	Images
Yaksha	Gen. et sp. nov	Valid	Daza et al.	Late Cretaceous (Cenomanian)	Burmese amber	Myanmar	An albanerpetontid. The type species is Y. perettii.	

=== Anurans ===
Name	Novelty	Status	Authors	Age	Type locality	Country	Notes	Images
Calyptocephalella sabrosa	Sp. nov	Valid	Muzzopappa et al.	Paleocene (Danian)	Salamanca Formation	Argentina	A frog. Originally described as a species of Calyptocephalella, but subsequently transferred to the genus Xerocephalella.	
Ceratophrys sagani	Sp. nov	Valid	Barcelos et al.	Probably late Pleistocene–early Holocene		Brazil	A South American horned frog.	
Kururubatrachus	Gen. et sp. nov	In press	Agnolin et al.	Early Cretaceous (Aptian)	Crato	Brazil	A neobatrachian frog resembling extant members of Hyloidea. Genus includes new species K. gondwanicus.	

=== Caudata ===
Name	Novelty	Status	Authors	Age	Type locality	Country	Notes	Images
Balveherpeton	Gen. et sp. nov	In press	Skutschas, Kolchanov & Schwermann	Early Cretaceous (Barremian–Aptian)		Germany	A salamandroid salamander. Genus includes new species B. hoennetalensis.	
Egoria	Gen. et sp. nov	Valid	Skutschas et al.	Middle Jurassic (Bathonian)	Itat Formation	Russia (Krasnoyarsk Krai)	A stem-salamander. The type species is E. malashichevi.	
Palaeoproteus miocenicus	Sp. nov	Valid	Vasilyan & Yanenko	Miocene (Vallesian)		Austria; Ukraine	A salamander belonging to the family Batrachosauroididae	

=== Others ===
Name	Novelty	Status	Authors	Age	Type locality	Country	Notes	Images
Brittagnathus	Gen. et sp. nov	Valid	Ahlberg & Clack	Devonian (Famennian)	Britta Dal	Greenland	A basal tetrapod. The type species is B. minutus.	
Leptoropha minima	Sp. nov	Valid	Bulanov	Permian		Russia (Tatarstan)	A member of Seymouriamorpha	
Microphon terminalis	Sp. nov	Valid	Bulanov	Late Permian		Russia (Vladimir Oblast)	A member of Seymouriamorpha belonging to the family Kotlassiidae.	
Seroherpeton	Gen. et sp. nov	Valid	Chen & Liu	Permian (Wuchiapingian)	Sunjiagou	China	A member of Embolomeri. The type species is S. yangquanensis.	
Steenerpeton	Gen. et sp. nov	Valid	Mann et al.	Carboniferous (Pennsylvanian)	Joggins	Canada (Nova Scotia)	A recumbirostran "microsaur". Genus includes new species S. silvae.	

== Research ==
- A study on the evolution of terrestrial locomotion in early tetrapods, based on data from 40 three-dimensionally preserved humeri from extinct tetrapodomorphs spanning the fin-to-limb transition, is published by Dickson et al. (2020).
- A study aiming to determine the potential significance of tides for the evolution of bony fish and early tetrapods from the Late Silurian to early Late Devonian is published by Byrne et al. (2020).
- A fibula of a member of the family Crassigyrinidae (otherwise known from the Viséan) is described from the Tournaisian of Blue Beach (Nova Scotia, Canada) by Lennie, Mansky & Anderson (2020).
- A study on the bone histology of Dvinosaurus campbelli is published by Uliakhin, Skutschas & Saburov (2020).
- A study evaluating the effects of ontogenetic disparity of known trematopid specimens on reconstructions of the phylogenetic relationships of trematopids is published by Gee (2020).
- Redescription of Actiobates peabodyi, including an updated description of the skull and the first description of the postcranial skeleton, is published by Gee & Reisz (2020).
- A study on the suture pattern in the skull and on the mandible anatomy of Cacops aspidephorus is published by Anderson, Scott & Reisz (2020).
- New amphibamiform specimen with exceptionally preserved lissamphibian-like integumentary structures, including the first evidence of toepad structures in a temnospondyl body fossil, is described from the Mazon Creek fossil beds by Mann & Gee (2020).
- Description of the anatomy of the skull of Pasawioops mayi, and a study on the ontogeny of this taxon, is published by Atkins et al. (2020).
- A study on growth patterns in Doleserpeton annectens, as indicated by bone histology, is published by Gee, Haridy & Reisz (2020).
- A study on a specimen of Benthosuchus korobkovi from the Olenekian of Russia affected by a neoplastic bone lesion in its jaw, representing the earliest case of such lesion in a tetrapod reported so far, is published by Novikov et al. (2020), who propose a non-odontogenic osteoma as the most likely diagnosis.
- Redescription and a study on the phylogenetic relationships of Aphaneramma kokeni is published by Maisch (2020), who considers A. kokeni to be a valid taxon.
- A study on the impact of local climatic and environmental conditions on growth patterns of the skeleton of Panthasaurus maleriensis is published by Teschner et al. (2020).
- Evidence of the presence of five metacarpals in a specimen of Metoposaurus krasiejowensis from the Upper Triassic of Poland is presented by Konietzko-Meier et al. (2020), who interpret this finding as evidence of pentadactyly of the manus of M. krasiejowensis, showing that the presence of a five-digit manus among Temnospondyli was possible.
- New fossil material of albanerpetontids is described from the lower Campanian Aguja Formation (Texas, United States) by Wick (2020), who interprets this finding as indicating that albanerpetontids were locally abundant there and also widespread throughout much of the Western Interior of North America by early Campanian time.
- A review of the caecilian fossil record is published by Santos, Laurin & Zaher (2020).
- New specimen of Triassurus sixtelae is described from the Triassic of Kyrgyzstan by Schoch, Werneburg & Voigt (2020), who identify this species as the oldest known stem-group salamander.
- A study on the skeletal anatomy and phylogenetic relationships of Chunerpeton tianyiense is published by Rong et al. (2020).
- A study on the diversity of skull shape in extant and fossil ribbed and crocodile newts, the relationship between their skull shape and ecological and reproductive traits, and its implications for the knowledge of the ecology of Chelotriton, is published by Pogoda et al. (2020).
- New pipimorph fossil material, providing new information on the morphological diversity among the earliest pipimorphs in South America, is described from the Aptian Crato Formation (Brazil) by Báez, Muzzopappa & Moura (2020), who also redescribe Cratopipa novaolindensis.
- Right ilium and a skull bone of a frog belonging to the genus Calyptocephalella are reported from the Eocene (Bartonian) La Meseta Formation (Antarctica) by Mörs, Reguero & Vasilyan (2020), representing the first record of a lissamphibian in Antarctica reported so far.
- Partial humerus of a member of the genus Eleutherodactylus is described from the Oligocene San Sebastian Formation (Puerto Rico) by Blackburn et al. (2020), representing the earliest fossil frog from any Caribbean island reported so far.
- Redescription of the anatomy and a study on the phylogenetic relationships of Eldeceeon rolfei is published by Ruta, Clack & Smithson (2020).
- A study on the long bone histology, growth rate and the timing of the attainment of sexual maturity in seymouriamorphs is published by Jordi Estefa et al. (2020).
- A study on the anatomy of the braincase and otic capsule of Seymouria is published by Bazzana et al. (2020).
- Description of new postcranial material of Seymouria from the Richards Spur locality (Oklahoma, United States), and a study on bone histology, life histories and evolution of terrestriality of seymouriamorphs, is published by Bazzana et al. (2020).
- A study on the anatomy of the skull of Euryodus dalyae, providing new information on the anatomy of the braincase and mandible, is published by Gee, Bevitt & Reisz (2020).
- Description of the anatomy of the braincase and stapes of Diadectes absitus is published by Klembara et al. (2020).
