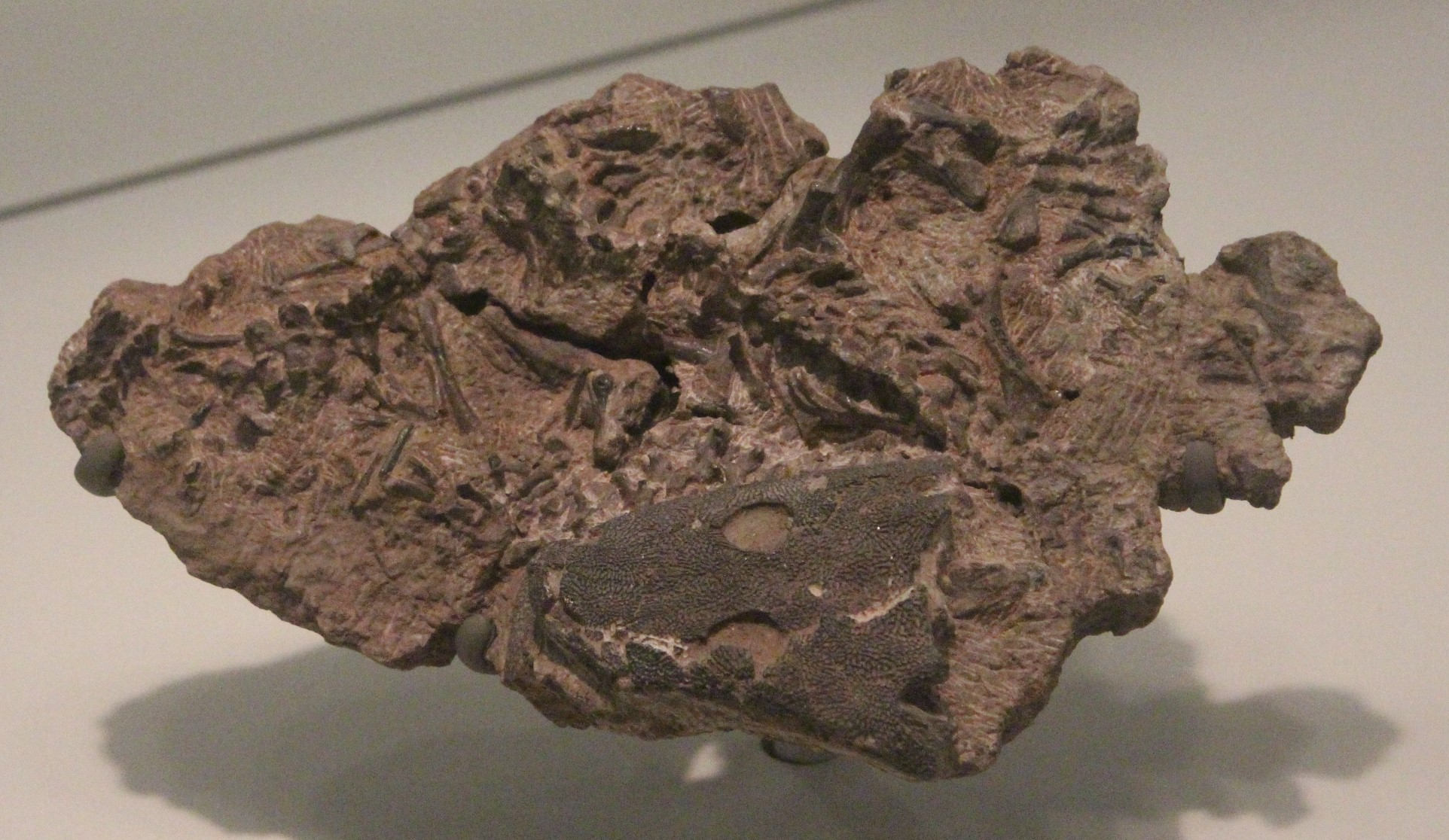
- Skull and skeleton (USNM 23354) of Lydekkerina, National Museum of Natural History

Scientific classification
- Kingdom: Animalia
- Phylum: Chordata
- Clade: Tetrapoda
- Order: †Temnospondyli
- Suborder: †Stereospondyli
- Family: †Lydekkerinidae
- Genus: †Lydekkerina; Broom, 1915

Species
- †L. huxleyi (Lydekker, 1889 [originally Bothriceps huxleyi) (type)

Synonyms
- Broomulus Romer, 1947; Limnoiketes Parrington, 1948; Putterillia Broom, 1915

= Lydekkerina =

Lydekkerina Temporal range: Early Triassic

Extinct genus of temnospondyls from the Early Triassic

Lydekkerina is an extinct genus of stereospondyl temnospondyl. It is the type genus of the family Lydekkerinidae. Fossils have been collected from Early Triassic deposits in South Africa and Australia. The type species is L. huxleyi, first described in 1889. While most other stereospondyls were semiaquatic, Lydekkerina was exclusively terrestrial.

== History and classification ==
Partial skull

Lydekkerina huxleyi was first briefly described as a species of Bothriceps by Richard Lydekker in 1889. The specific name honors Thomas Henry Huxley, an English biologist who named the genus Bothriceps in 1859 from material in Australia. Robert Broom, a South African paleontologist, provided a more accurate description of the species in 1915 and reassigned it to the new genus Lydekkerina, named after Lydekker. The type specimen and a paratype specimen were described in much greater detail, particularly the lower jaw, in 2007 by R. Hewison, and a detailed account of its sacral region, pelvic girdle and hind limb.

Lydekkerina is one of the most common temnospondyls found from the Permo-Triassic Karoo Basin of South Africa. Many fossils have been found from the Lystrosaurus Assemblage Zone of the Beaufort Group. Many, however, are poorly preserved, being crushed or deformed. The variable conditions of specimens has resulted in confusion in identification. Some paleontologists have proposed that variations in skull shape among specimens represent deformities rather than true morphologies. Therefore, characteristics that distinguish different lydekkerinids from one another may be the results of preservation, not taxonomic distinctness. In 2006, it was proposed that the South African lydekkerinids Limnoiketes and Broomulus were synonymous with Lydekkerina for this reason.

A second species of Lydekkerina, L. putterilli, was named by Broom in 1930. Its description was based on a small partial skull from the Permian Dicynodon Assemblage Zone. It was later considered to be a juvenile rhinesuchid related to Uranocentrodon. In 2000, L. putterilli was assigned to its own genus, Broomistega.

Broom described a third species, L. kitchingi, from the Dicynodon Assemblage Zone in 1950. In 1996 it was reassigned as a juvenile form of the rhinesuchid Muchocephalus. In 2003, both L. kitchingi and Muchocephalus were synonymized with Laccosaurus.

Temnospondyl remains from the Early Triassic Rewan Formation of Queensland, Australia, were described in 2006 and assigned to Lydekkerina huxleyi. These remains possess characters diagnostic of Lydekkerina such as the ridges underneath the skull roof and the vomerine shagreen.

== Description ==
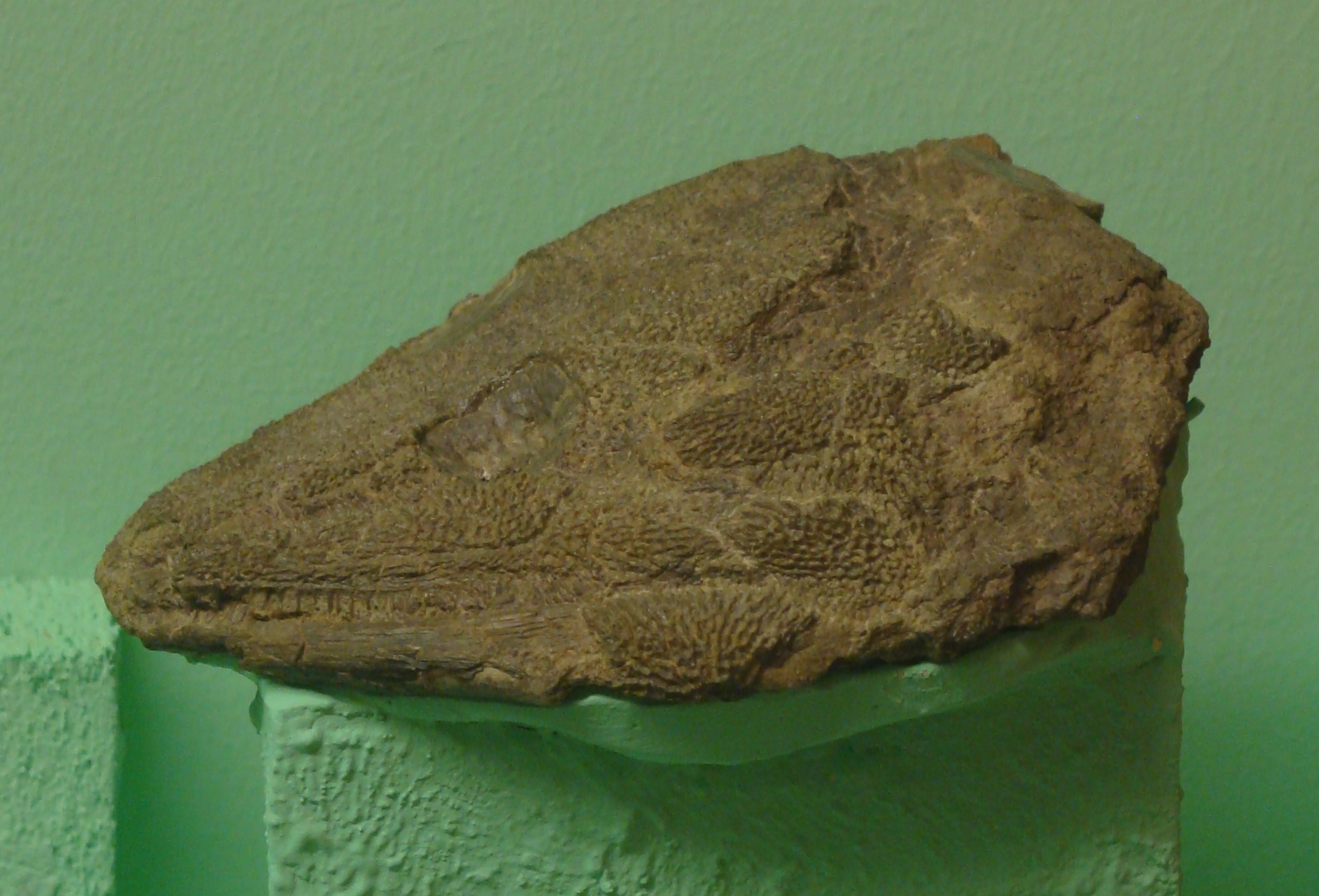
Skull in University of Michigan Museum of Natural History

Lydekkerina was a relatively small temnospondyl, growing up to around 1 metre (3.3 ft) in length. Skulls range in length from 49 millimetres (1.9 in) in the smallest known individual to up to 100 millimetres (3.9 in) in larger individuals. The skull is wedge-shaped and has a parabolic outline with convex lateral margins. Shallow pits cover the surface of the skull. Teeth line the palate as well as the jaws, and some skulls even bear large ectopterygoid tusks on the underside of the skull.

Lydekkerina can be distinguished from other lydekkerinids on the basis of several skull characteristics. One such feature is the presence of vomerine shagreen, tiny bumps covering the bones of the palate. An opening at the tip of the palate called the anterior palatal vacuity is divided by two projections of the skull roof, a second distinctive feature of the genus. Moreover, distinctive ridges are present on the underside of the skull roof around the eye sockets, probably to provide structural support.

== Paleobiology ==
Life restoration

Because the bones of Lydekkerina are more heavily ossified than other stereospondyls, it is thought to have been terrestrial. Large bony projections on the skeleton likely served as attachments for strong muscles. Joints between bones were well-developed, enabling effective locomotion on land. The sensory system of pressure-sensitive sulci across the skull is poorly developed, suggesting that Lydekkerina had little use for these organs in a land environment. The skeleton of Lydekkerina is similar to those of early stereospondyl relatives such as the archegosauroids, but bears little resemblance to those of the exclusively terrestrial Permian temnospondyls.
