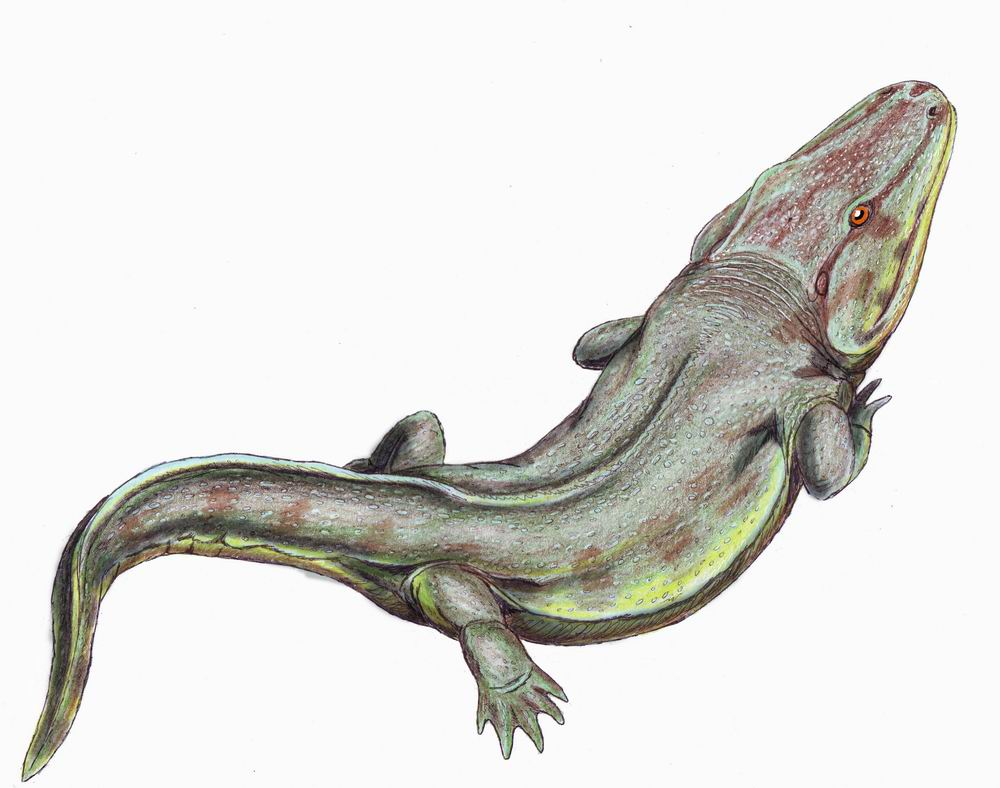
- Rhinesuchus

Scientific classification
- Kingdom: Animalia
- Phylum: Chordata
- Clade: Tetrapoda
- Order: †Temnospondyli
- Suborder: †Stereospondyli
- Family: †Rhinesuchidae; Watson, 1919

Genera
- †Australerpeton? Barbarena, 1998; †Broomistega Broom, 1930; †Laccosaurus Haughton, 1925; †Parapytanga? Strapasson et al., 2015; †Rastosuchus Dias et al., 2020; †Rhineceps Haughton, 1927; †Rhinesuchoides Olson & Broom, 1937; †Rhinesuchus Broom, 1908; †Uranocentrodon van Hoepen, 1911

Synonyms
- Australerpetonidae Barbarena, 1998; Rhinecepidae Oschev, 1966; Uranocentrodontidae Romer, 1947

= Rhinesuchidae =

Rhinesuchids Temporal range: Guadalupian-Early Triassic, 279.3–247.2 Ma

Extinct family of temnospondyls

Rhinesuchidae is a family of tetrapods that lived primarily in the Permian period. They belonged to the broad group Temnospondyli, a successful and diverse collection of semiaquatic tetrapods which modern amphibians are probably descended from. Rhinesuchids can be differentiated from other temnospondyls by details of their skulls, most notably the interior structure of their otic notches at the back of the skull. They were among the earliest-diverging members of the Stereospondyli, a subgroup of temnospondyls with flat heads and aquatic habits. Although more advanced stereospondyls evolved to reach worldwide distribution in the Triassic period, rhinesuchids primarily lived in the high-latitude environments of Gondwana (what is now South America and Africa) during the Guadalupian and Lopingian epochs of the Permian. The taxonomy of this family has been convoluted, with more than twenty species having been named in the past; a 2017 review recognized only eight of them (distributed among seven genera) to be valid. While several purported members of this group have been reported to have lived in the Triassic period, most are either dubious or do not belong to the group. However, at least one valid genus of rhinesuchid is known from the early Triassic, a small member known as Broomistega. The most recent formal definition of Rhinesuchidae, advocated by Mariscano et al. (2017) is that of a stem-based clade containing all taxa more closely related to Rhinesuchus whaitsi than to Lydekkerina huxleyi or Peltobatrachus pustulatus. A similar alternate definition is that Rhinesuchidae is a stem-based clade containing all taxa more closely related to Uranocentrodon senekalensis than to Lydekkerina huxleyi, Trematosaurus brauni, or Mastodonsaurus giganteus.

== Description ==
Rhinesuchids generally had a conventional body type for tetrapods, with four limbs and a moderately long tail. In addition, their bodies were also somewhat elongated and their limbs were small and weak but still rather well-developed. Some were very large, up to 3 meters (10 feet) in length. Like most stereospondyls, their skulls were flattened and triangular, with upward-pointing eyes. Most rhinesuchids had relatively short snouts, although the snout of Australerpeton was very long and thin. The only other giant long-snouted Permian amphibians were members of the family Archegosauridae, such as Prionosuchus and Konzhukovia.

=== Otic notch ===
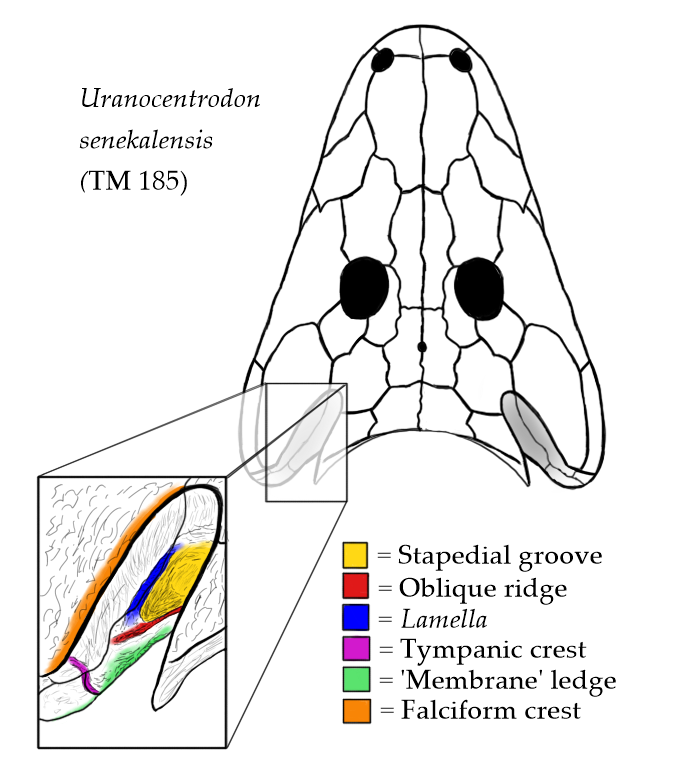
The skull of Uranocentrodon, with the otic region expanded to show rhinesuchid otic features.

Like most ancient amphibians, rhinesuchids had a pair of indentations at the rear edge of the skull known as otic notches. While sometimes considered to have housed hearing organs such as a tympanum (eardrum), these notches are more likely to have held spiracles, fleshy holes used for breathing. Rhinesuchids can be characterized by a unique system of ridges and grooves within the inner cavity of each otic notch. The walls of the otic notch cavity (sometimes referred to as a tympanic cavity) are mainly made up of the ascending branch of the pterygoid bones. Nevertheless, the inside edge of each cavity is formed by a tabular bone. The tabular bones are a pair of triangular bones along the rear edge of the skull which form pointed structures known as tabular horns. The upper part of the outer wall of the cavity is also formed partly from the squamosal bones, which mostly occupy the flat upper face of the skull. The portion of the squamosal which forms the cavity wall is separated by the portion outside of the cavity by a pronounced boundary known as a falciform crest.

The outer wall of the cavity has a long and pronounced groove, known as a stapedial groove, which extends lengthwise along the wall. The lower edge of the groove is formed by a ridge/crest known as an oblique ridge, although it has also been called a crista obliqua, otic flange, or simply an oblique crest. The upper edge of the stapedial groove is formed by another ridge/crest bordering the squamosal bone, which Eltink et al. (2016) named the 'dorsal pterygoid crest'. However, Mariscano et al. (2017) preferred to use the name "lamella" for this structure so that it would not be confused with a different ridge present in lydekkerinids, which is sometimes termed an 'oblique crest of the pterygoid', but more commonly called a 'tympanic crest'. Confusingly enough, many rhinesuchids are also known to possess a tympanic crest. This ridge was positioned further back than the other ridges (near the intersection of the pterygoid, quadrate, and squamosal bones) and extends down along the rear face of the cheek. The inner edge of the outer wall of the cavity was formed by a ledge which most studies simply label 'membrane'. This convention exists as a result of the old and likely incorrect hypothesis that otic notches housed eardrums. Under this hypothesis, the inner ledge may have attached to a membrane stretching along the inner cavity of the ear.

This combination of otic cavity grooves and ridges is unique to rhinesuchids. The lamella and stapedial groove are unknown in any other groups, although they are present in practically every rhinesuchid (except Broomistega, which lacks a lamella). The tympanic crest is present in most rhinesuchids but absent in a few, and it is additionally present in lydekkerinids. The oblique ridge/crest and falciform crest are present in most other stereospondyls (although the former is less well-developed), while the 'membrane' ledge is present in practically every stereospondylomorph.

=== Palate and braincase ===
Various bones and openings comprised the palate (roof of the mouth) in rhinesuchids, as in other amphibians. At the tip of the palate lied the vomers, while the areas near the edge of the mouth were made of the palatine and ectopterygoid bones. In the middle of the rear part of the mouth was a rectangular bone known as a parasphenoid. Most of the parasphenoid formed the lower face of the flattened braincase, although it also possesses a thin forward-projecting rod known as a cultriform process, which extends down the midline of the skull to meet the vomers. Towards the back of the mouth, there were the multi-pronged pterygoid bones on each side of the skull. Each pterygoid had several branches, including the posterior branch which stretches back and to the side of the skull, the short medial branch which extends inwards and connects to the parasphenoid bone, an ascending branch which projects upwards to form the otic notch, and finally the anterior branch which extends forward along the palatine and ectopterygoid. The pterygoids of most rhinesuchids have very long anterior branches. In most members of this family, the anterior branch reaches as far forward as the vomers, although Australerpeton has relatively short anterior branches. A pair of large openings, known as interpterygoid vacuities, fill the areas between these bones, making the majority of the palate open space.

When seen from behind, the upper branches of the braincase (paroccipital processes) extends from side to side, partially concealing the ascending branch of the pterygoids. Each paroccipital process is also perforated by a small hole, known as post-temporal fenestrae. These holes are very thin in rhinesuchids. Above these paroccipital processes lie the otic notches as well as the tabular bones. The paroccipital processes also point backwards to some extent, forming horns which in some rhinesuchids are slightly longer than those of the tabulars. When seen from below, the most prominent portion of the braincase is the parasphenoid bone. The rear corners of the parasphenoid have small 'pockets' bordered by ridges (known as crista muscularis). These ridges may have anchored muscles capable of maneuvering the head on the neck.

=== Other skull and jaw features ===
Many bones made up the upper side of the skull, although a particular pair of bones acquired a specific design in rhinesuchids. These bones were the elongated jugal and prefrontal bones, which formed the front edge of the orbits (eye holes). In most rhinesuchids, the edge between the two bones possessed a 'stepped' shape, with a triangular outer extension of the prefrontal pushing the suture with the jugal towards a more lateral (outwards) position. However, the suture is more straight in Australerpeton, like in other stereospondyls.

The lower jaw has a pair of holes only visible from the inside edge of the jaw. The larger hole at the rear part of the bone complex, known as a posterior Meckelian foramen, was thin and elongated in rhinesuchids. An additional hole on the underside of the jaw joint is only visible from below. This hole, the chorda tympanic foramen, was large in this family. On the upper side of the jaw joint, a thin groove known as an arcadian groove stretches towards the lingual (tongue) side of the jaw and separates other bony bumps located among the jaw joint. As a whole, the grooves and ridges of the jaw joint were poorly developed in rhinesuchids compared to that of many other stereospondyl groups, instead resembling the simple joint of archegosaurids such as Melosaurus.

== Paleobiology ==
Most rhinesuchids are only known from skull material, although a few members of the group (Uranocentrodon, Broomistega, and Australerpeton, for example) include specimens preserving a significant portion of the rest of the skeleton. A juvenile specimen of Broomistega had ankles and vertebrae which were poorly ossified, indicating that its joints had a large amount of cartilaginous material to supplement the low amount of bone. This trait is often correlated with an aquatic lifestyle. Features of the skull, such as upwards-pointing eyes, also support this hypothesis.

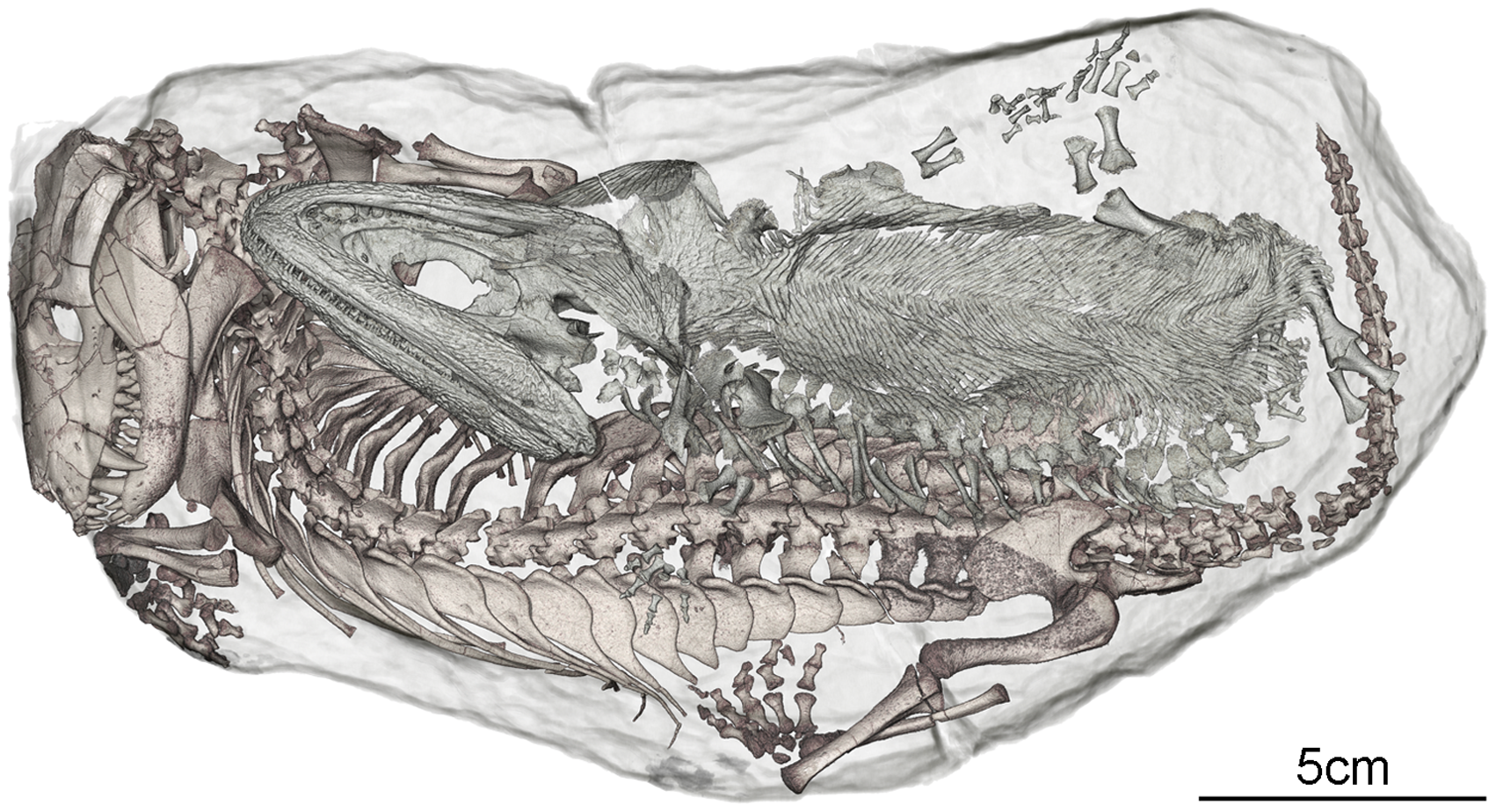
Broomistega (green) preserved in a fossilized burrow with Thrinaxodon (brown)

Despite this support for an aquatic lifestyle, other pieces of evidence show that rhinesuchids were capable of some terrestrial movement. Although rhinesuchids did not possess any adaptations for digging, the poorly ossified juvenile specimen of Broomistega was found in a flooded burrow which was also inhabited by a Thrinaxodon. Various conditions of the way these animals were preserved indicate that they co-inhabited the burrow peacefully, likely to survive a drought by aestivating (staying in a dormant state during hot and dry conditions). The fact that a Broomistega was able to enter the burrow of a terrestrial animal such as Thrinaxodon indicates that rhinesuchids were not exclusively aquatic.

In addition, it has been noted that larger temnospondyls generally have more well-ossified joints. For example, large specimens of Australerpeton possessed robust hips, several completely bony ankle bones, and ossified pleurocentra (part of the vertebrae). Nevertheless, these skeletons were not as strongly built as those of Eryops (a supposedly terrestrial temnospondyl), with smaller shoulder girdles and less prominent sites for muscle attachment. Dias & Schultz (2003) suggested that the lifestyle of Australerpeton (and presumably other rhinesuchids) was that of a semiaquatic piscivore (fish-eater), preferring to hunt in shallow bodies of freshwater yet retaining the ability to walk on land during droughts.

A Histological study of several indeterminate rhinesuchid fossils (referred to Rhinesuchus) indicate that members of the family grew seasonally, as in modern amphibians. Individuals also had fairly long life span, with one specimen being 30 to 35 years old at the time of its death based on the number of lines of arrested growth (rings in the bone used to tell age, like tree rings) present in a hip fragment. Some lines of arrested growth were very narrow, indicating that the individuals could reduce their growth and metabolism during times of hardship. This ability may be the reason why rhinesuchids were rather successful at the end of the Permian, as well as how a few small members of the group survived the Permian-Triassic extinction event.

=== Gills ===
Three rows of tiny bones (branchial ossicles) covered with thin tooth-like structures (branchial denticles) have been preserved near the neck of one specimen of Uranocentrodon. These bones almost certainly attached to the branchial arches of gills while the animal was alive. Although such bones are rare among stereospondyls and unknown in any other rhinesuchids, this may simply be due to the fact that the bones of other genera were preserved in more rough-grained sediments where such delicate bones could be broken or difficult to find.

Although evidently Uranocentrodon had gills of some kind, it is difficult to determine what kind of gills they were. On the one hand, they could have been internal gills like those of fish, which were hardly visible from the outside of the body. On the other hand, they could have been stalk-like external gills like those of modern salamander larvae or even neotenic adult salamanders such as the mudpuppy or axolotl. External gills had to have evolved from internal gills sometime during amphibian evolution, although the precise location of this transition is controversial. The gill-supporting bones preserved in ancient amphibians show many similarities with those of fish gills and salamander gills. Paleontologists who prefer comparing ancient tetrapods to modern amphibians generally find many similarities between the fossil bones and modern salamander gill bones. On the other hand, paleontologists who compare fossil tetrapods to fossil fish consider the bones to correlate with internal gills. This conundrum, known as Bystrow's paradox, has made it difficult to assess gills in ancient amphibians such as Uranocentrodon, as different paleontologists come to different conclusions based on their field of study.

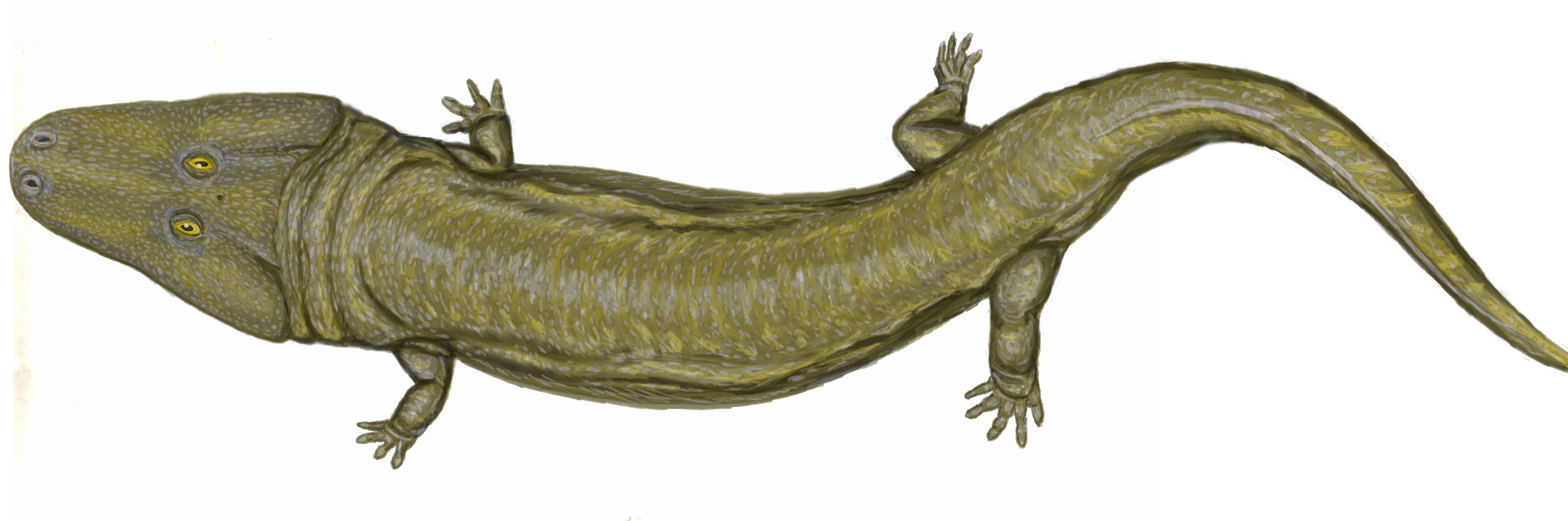
Uranocentrodon, a very large member of the family which possessed gills and body armor

Bystrow's paradox was finally resolved by a 2010 study, which found that grooved ceratobrachnial structures (components of the branchial arches) are correlated with internal gills. Ancient tetrapods which preserved grooved ceratobranchials, such as the dvinosaur Dvinosaurus, probably only had internal gills as adults. Nevertheless, external gills have been directly preserved as soft tissue in some temnospondyls. However, these situations only occur in larval specimens or members of specialized groups such as the branchiosaurids. One living species of lungfish (Lepidosiren) has external gills as larvae which transform into internal gills as adults. Despite adult dvinosaur specimens having skeletal features correlated with internal gills, some larval specimens of another dvinosaur, Isodectes preserved soft tissue external gills. Thus, the gill development of dvinosaurs (and presumably other temnospondyls, such as Uranocentrodon) mirrored that of Lepidosiren. Despite this feature likely being an example of convergent evolution (as other lungfish exclusively possessed internal gills), it still remains a useful gauge for how temnospondyl gills developed. The study's writers concluded that the gills of temnospondyls (including Uranocentrodon and other rhinesuchids which may have possessed gills) were probably internal (like those of a fish) as an adult, but external (like those of a salamander) as a larva.

=== Body armor ===
One Uranocentrodon skeleton also preserved large patches of bony scutes or scales around the body. The scutes which would have been on the belly of the animal were arranged in parallel diagonal rows which converged at the midline of the body and diverged as the rows stretched towards the tail. Each scute had a ridge running down the middle, and the scutes further towards the midline overlapped the ones further out. Along the midline, a row of flat and wide scales stretched from the throat to the tail. While these belly scales were made of bone, scales on other parts of the body had less bone structure and were probably made of keratin instead. The scales on the sides of the body were flatter and smaller than the bony belly scutes. The scutes on the back of the body were similar, although more rounded in shape, with a few larger scutes near the midline. The scales of the hind limbs and the underside of the hip region were similar to those of the back, although no integument was preserved on the forelimbs or tail. Thus, it is likely that at least the tail was unarmored and only covered with naked skin.

Scales have also been preserved in Australerpeton specimens. They are similar in distribution to those of Uranocentrodon, but are generally rounder in shape. They also possessed a honeycomb-like internal structure and histological features which indicate that they were deeply embedded in skin. Therefore, it is unlikely that they would have been visible from the outside of the body. It cannot be determined whether the scales or scutes of rhinesuchids would have enabled or restricted cutaneous respiration (breathing through the skin as in modern amphibians). Other potential applications of the scales included protection against predators, retaining water during droughts, and possibly even for storing calcium when conditions are harsh (a technique used by female African crocodiles).This last hypothesis is the least likely, as rhinesuchids did not lay hard-shelled eggs, which is the reason female crocodiles need to store calcium.

== Classification ==
When the family was first named in 1919, Rhinesuchidae was already recognized as a group of basal stereospondyls, a position which it retains even in the present day. Among the traits used to support this position include the fact that most rhinesuchids had long anterior branches of their pterygoids. More advanced stereospondyls had shorter anterior branches. In 1947, Alfred Romer placed the family (which he believed only included Rhinesuchus) in a broad superfamily which he called Rhinesuchoidea. Rhinesuchoidea was intended to be part of an evolutionary grade of temnospondyls linking "primitive" rhachitomes such as Eryops to "advanced" stereospondyls such as metoposaurs and trematosaurs. This grade, termed "neorhachitomes", was separated into Capitosauroidea (which contained capitosaurs and "benthosuchids") and Rhinesuchoidea. Apart from containing Rhinesuchidae, Rhinesuchoidea also contained various genera as well as the families Lydekkerinidae, Sclerothoracidae, and finally Uranocentrodontidae. Romer felt that certain taxa (i.e. Uranocentrodon and the possibly synonymous dubious genus "Laccocephalus") often considered rhinesuchids were best placed in the separate family Uranocentrodontidae, while others (i.e. Rhinesuchoides) were not placed in any rhinesuchoid family in particular. Other families were later placed in this Rhinesuchoidea, such as Rhinecepidae in 1966 and Australerpetonidae in 1998.

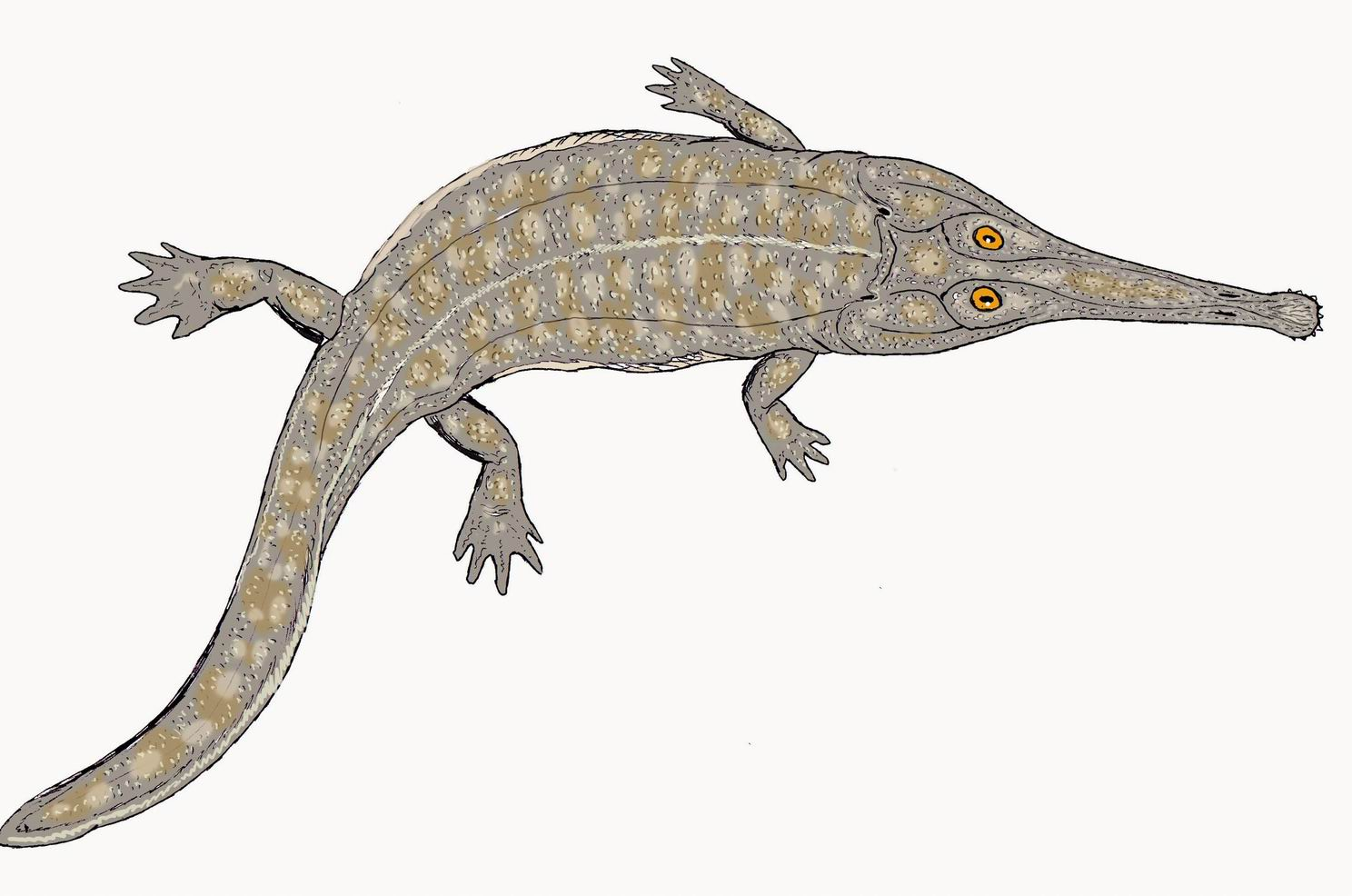
Australerpeton, a long-snouted putative member of the family

The arrival of cladistics in the late 20th century has caused grades to fall out of favor in recent years, replaced by clades, which are defined by close relations rather than ancestral assemblages. However, the basic idea behind Rhinesuchoidea, which states that advanced stereospondyls descended from animals similar to rhinesuchids, is still considered valid. Rhinecepidae and Uranocentrodontidae were found to be synonymous with Rhinesuchidae according to a 2000 analysis by Schoch and Milner. One study placed Rhinesuchidae within the superfamily Capitosauroidea. However, this interpretation has not been followed by other studies which consider rhinesuchids to be more basal than capitosaurs. Australerpetonidae, a monotypic family only containing the genus Australerpeton, has been more difficult to compare to Rhinesuchidae. Some studies place Australerpeton as a basal stereospondyl outside of Rhinesuchidae, while others consider it an archegosaurid outside of Stereospondyli entirely.

A comprehensive review of Australerpeton published by Eltink et al. (2016) favored the hypothesis that it was deeply nested within Rhinesuchidae. A phylogenetic study performed as part of the study split the family into two clades. One clade was a subfamily termed Rhinesuchinae. Rhinesuchinae contains Rhinesuchus and Rhineceps. This subfamily is mainly characterized by features of the palate, such as an anterior branch of the pterygoid lacking ridges and palatine bones covered in tiny denticles. The other main clade of the family contained Uranocentrodon as well as another subfamily termed Australerpetinae. This clade is united by the presence of a tympanic crest and a foramen magnum (the hole for the spinal cord at the back of the braincase) which has a curved upper edge. Australerpetinae is a modified version of Australerpetonidae which has been reduced to subfamily status in order to fit within Rhinesuchidae. This subfamily contains Australerpeton, Broomistega, Laccosaurus, and Rhinesuchoides. Members of this subfamily had somewhat longer and more tapered snouts than other Rhinesuchids, although (according to Eltink et al..) their pterygoids had short anterior branches, letting the palatine bones contact the interpterygoid vacuities. The most parsimonious (evolutionarily simplest) tree found by Eltink et al. (2016) is seen below:

- Temnospondyli
  - Dendrerpeton
  - - Eryops
    - - Trimerorhachis
      - Stereospondylomorpha
        - - Konzhukovia
          - Tryphosuchus
        - Stereospondyli
          - - - Lapillopsis
              - Peltobatrachus
            - - Lydekkerina
              - - Mastodonsaurus
                - Benthosuchus
          - Rhinesuchidae
            - Rhinesuchinae
              - Rhineceps
              - Rhinesuchus
            - - Uranocentrodon
              - Australerpetinae
                - - Broomistega
                  - - Australerpeton
                    - Rastosuchus (Serra do Cadeado short-snouted)
                - - - Laccosaurus
                    - - BP-1-4473
                      - - "Rhinesuchus" capensis
                        - Rhinesuchoides

The structure of Rhinesuchidae following Eltink et al.'s study was challenged by a different study on rhinesuchids published less than a year later. This study, Mariscano et al.. (2017), agreed that Australerpeton was a rhinesuchid, but considered it the most basal member of the family. They disagree with Eltink et al.'s recognition of short anterior pterygoid branches in multiple genera. According to their analysis, only Australerpeton possessed this trait, the main feature which separates it from the rest of Rhinesuchidae. Other traits which support this separation include the fact that other rhinesuchids have stepped jugal-prefrontal contact and toothless coronoid bones in the lower jaw. The rest of the family was poorly resolved in their phylogenetic analysis, although three clades did have moderate Bremer support values of 2.

Bremer support is gauged by counting the number of times analyzed traits are acquired, lost, or reacquired within a family tree. Some family trees include more of these transitions than others, meaning that some possible trees assumed that more than the bare minimum amount of evolution had taken place. The family tree with the fewest of these 'steps' (transitions) is likely to be the most accurate, based on the principle of Occam's razor (the simplest answer is the most accurate). Bremer support is used to label how well-supported clades are by analyzing how they are distributed among more complex alternatives to the simplest (most parsimonious) tree. Clades which do not exist in a family tree which is only one total step more complex than the MPT (most parsimonious tree) have a Bremer support of 1, meaning that the clade's existence is very uncertain. Even if the MPT of the present analysis supports their existence, new data may make a competing family tree more parsimonious, dissolving clades which are only supported in the current MPT. Other clades may have much higher Bremer support values, indicating that more drastic assumptions have to be formulated to render the clade invalid. Rhinesuchidae as a whole, for example, has a Bremer support of 6 in Mariscano et al. (2017), which is considered high support. A Bremer support of 2, as is the case with three specific clades in this analysis, is considered moderate. One of these clades included the two valid species of Rhinesuchoides, while another clade connected Rhineceps and Uranocentrodon, and the last contained Rhinesuchus and Laccosaurus. The arrangement of these clades (as well as the placement of Broomistega) could not be resolved with absolute confidence, with Bremer support values of only 1 regardless of where the three clades were placed among non-Australerpeton Rhinesuchidae. The most parsimonious tree found by Mariscano et al. (2017) is seen below:

- Temnospondyli
  - Eryops
  - Stereospondylomorpha
    - - Archegosaurus
      - Sclerocephalus
    - - Konzhukovia
      - Stereospondyli
        - - Uruyiella
          - Peltobatrachus
        - - Rhinesuchidae
            - Australerpeton
            - - Rhinesuchoides
              - - - Rhineceps
                  - Uranocentrodon
                - - Broomistega
                  - - Rhinesuchus
                    - Laccosaurus
          - - - Arachana
              - Lydekkerina
            - - Eolydekkerina
              - - - Watsonisuchus
                  - Benthosuchus
                - - Lapillopsis
                  - - Laidleria
                    - - Keratobrachyops
                      - Arcadia

== Gallery ==
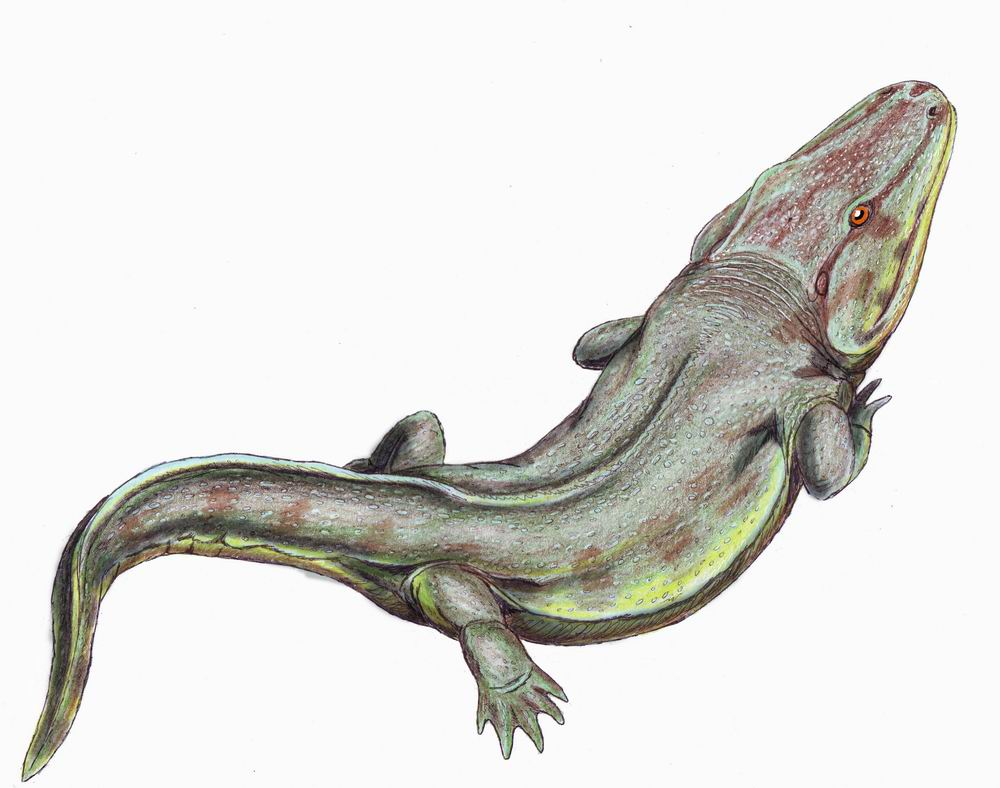
Rhinesuchus whaitsi, of the middle to late Permian of South Africa

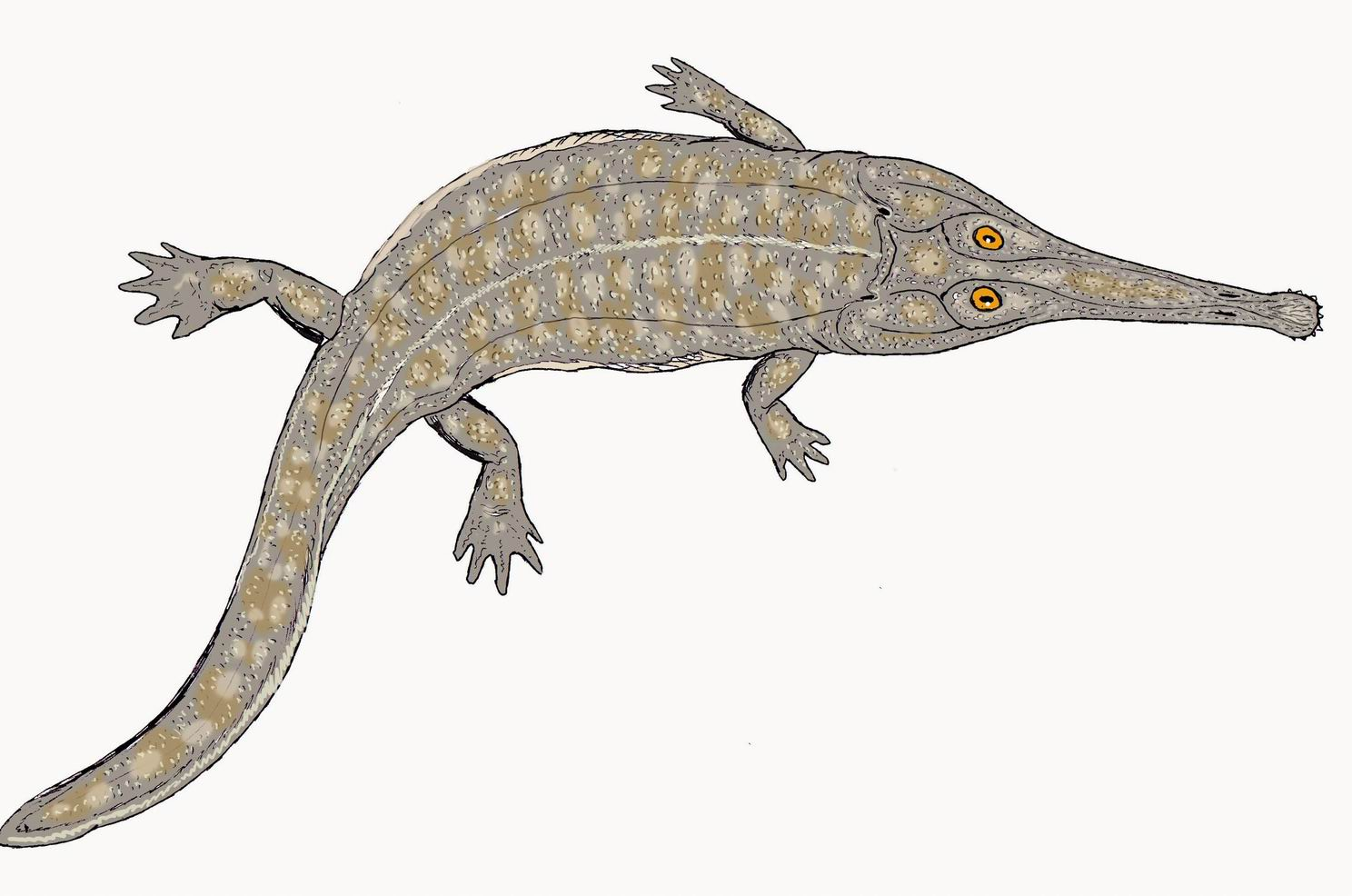
Australerpeton cosgriffi, an unusually long-snouted rhinesuchid of the middle to late Permian of Brazil

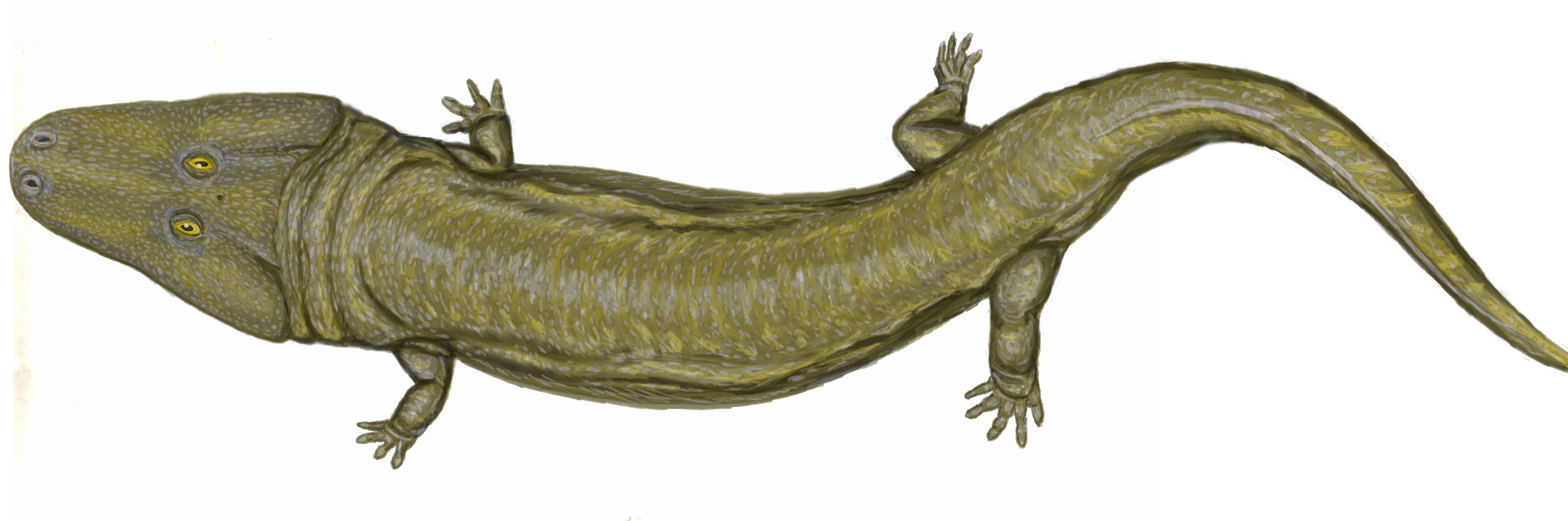
Uranocentrodon senekalensis, of the late Permian of South Africa

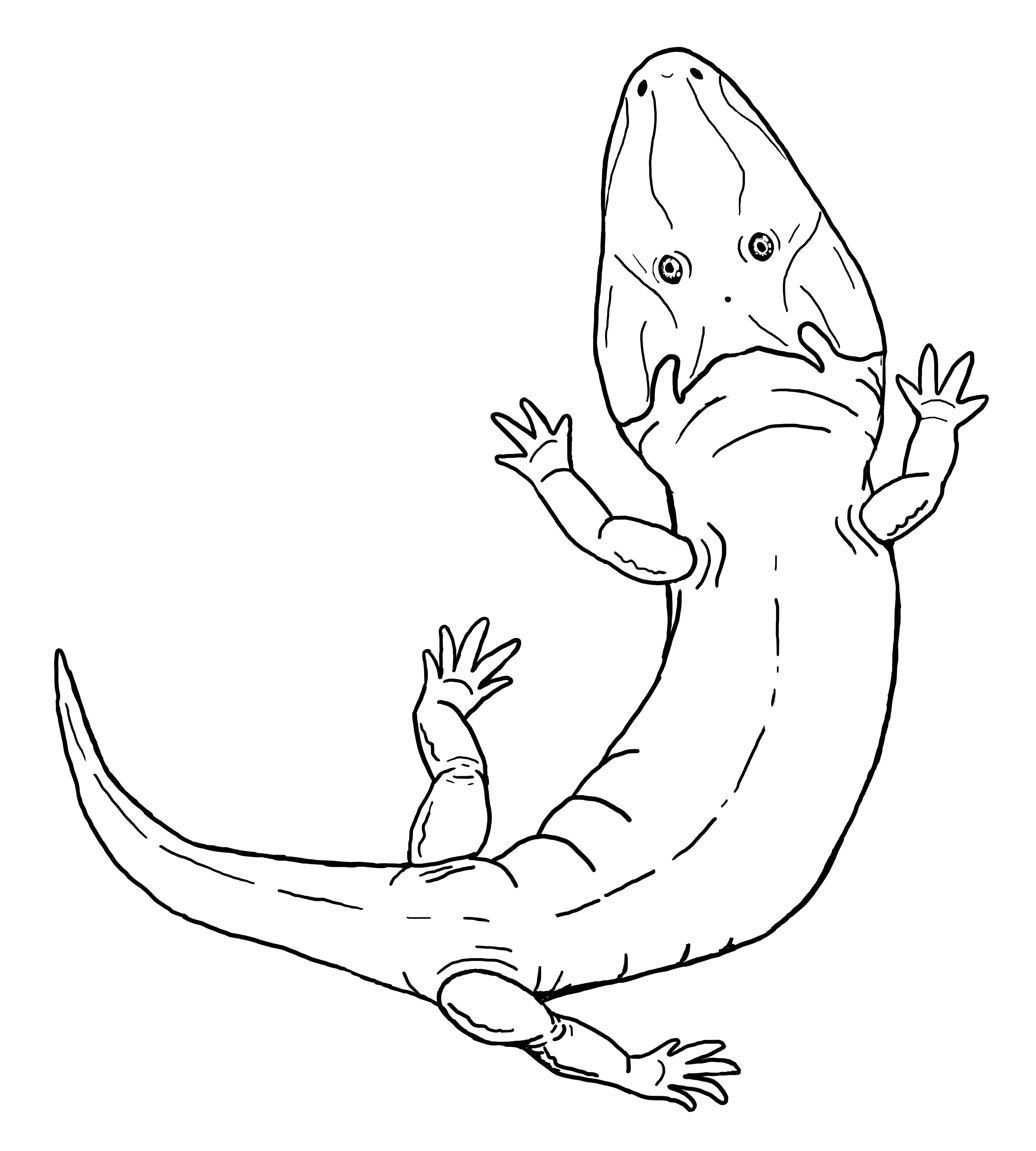
Rhineceps nyasaensis, of the late Permian of Malawi

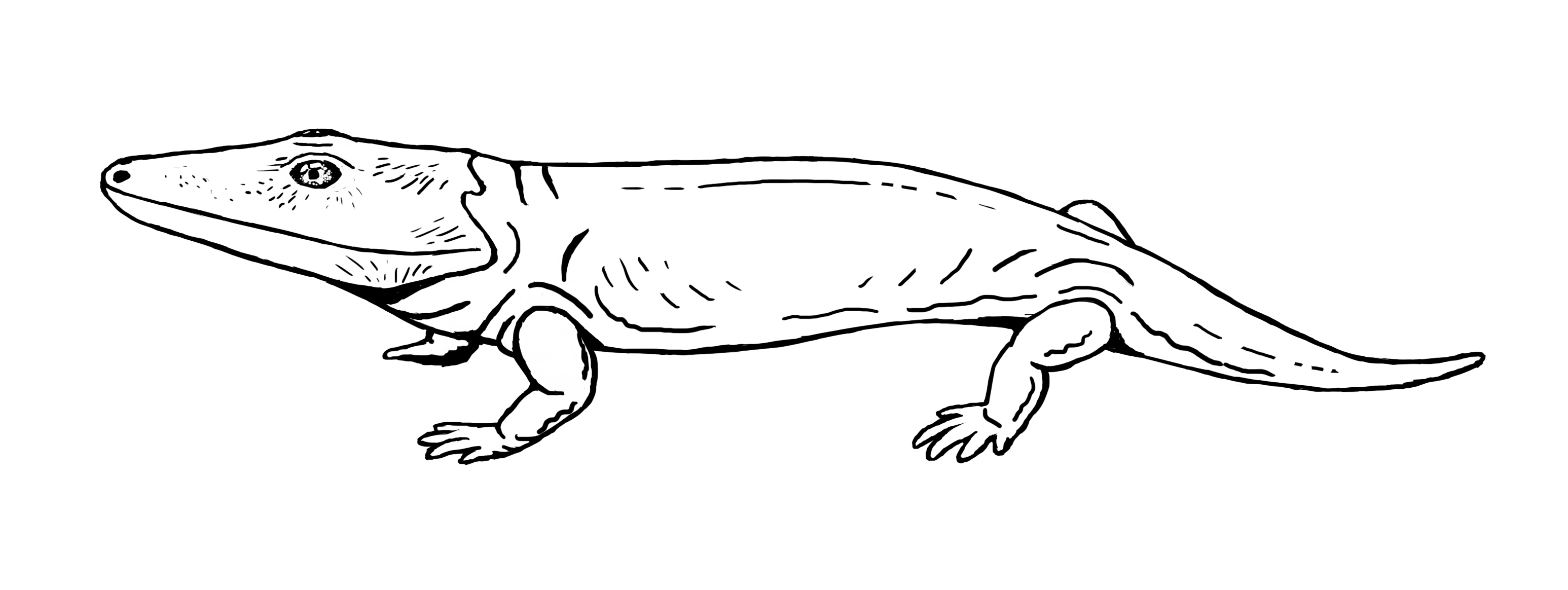
Broomistega putterilli, of the early Triassic of South Africa
