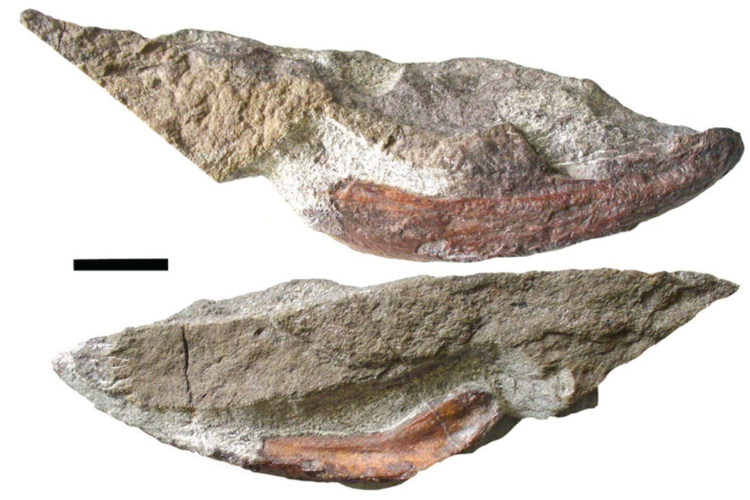
- Holotype of B. minutus

Scientific classification
- Kingdom: Animalia
- Phylum: Chordata
- Clade: Stegocephali
- Genus: †Brittagnathus; Ahlberg & Clack, 2020
- Species: †B. minutus

Binomial name
- †Brittagnathus minutus Ahlberg & Clack, 2020

= Brittagnathus =

Brittagnathus Temporal range: late Famennian

Extinct genus of tetrapodomorphs

Brittagnathus is an extinct genus of four-limbed vertebrate ("tetrapod") from the Late Devonian of East Greenland. The genus contains a single species, Brittagnathus minutus, representing the smallest known Devonian tetrapod based on a complete lower jaw.

== Discovery and naming ==
The Brittagnathus holotype, NHMD 116368, was discovered from the Acanthostega bonebed in the Britta Dal Formation. It is the fourth named genus of "tetrapod" (more precisely a stem-tetrapod or stegocephalian) from the Late Devonian of Greenland, after Ichthyostega, Acanthostega, and Ymeria.

The generic name Brittagnathus combines the prefix britta in reference to the type locality, which was named after Britta Säve-Söderbergh, and Latin word gnathus meaning 'jaw'. The specific name, minutus, reflects the small size of the type specimen.

== Description ==
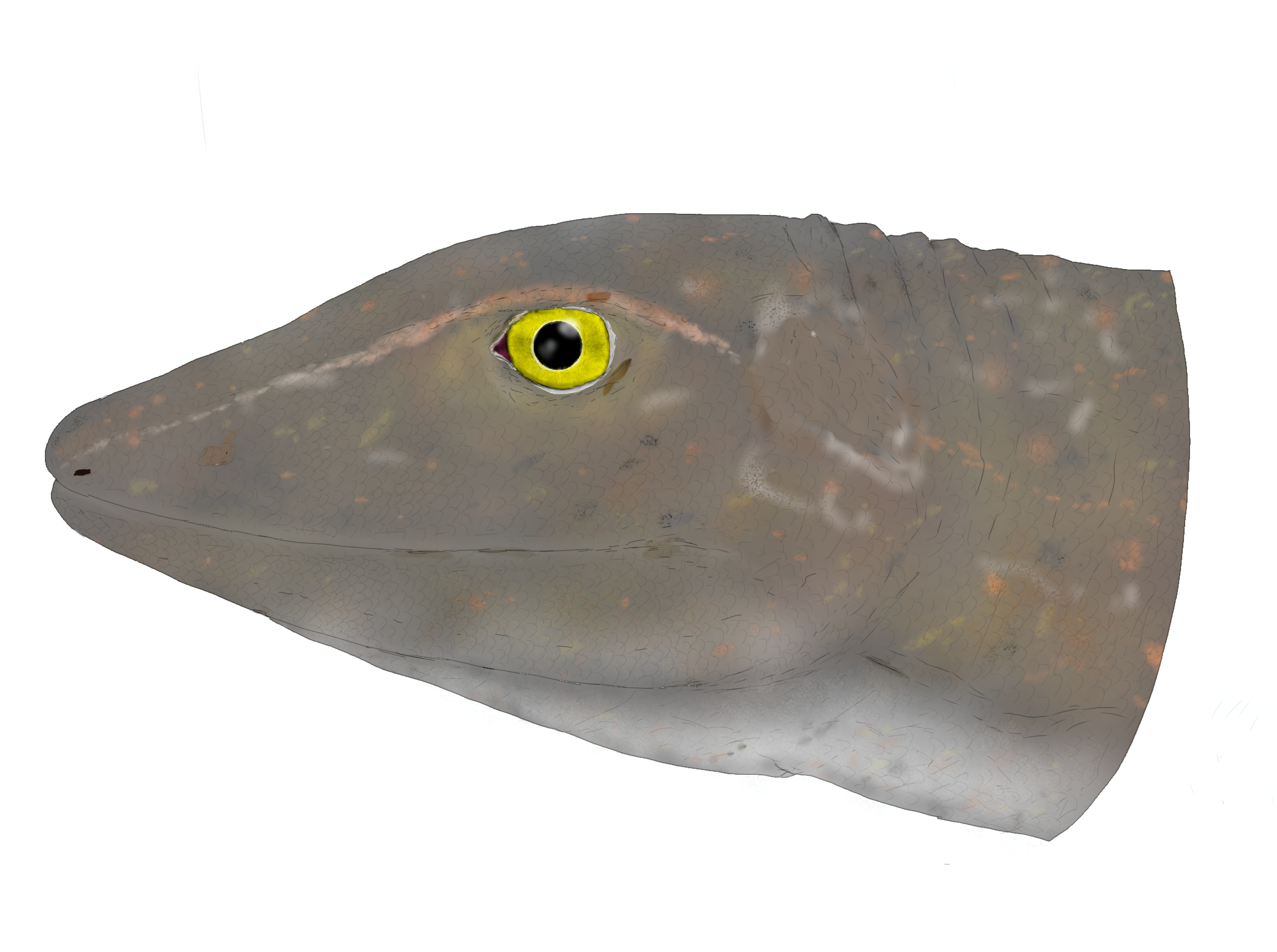
Speculative head restoration based on its close relative Pederpes

The lower jaw of Brittagnathus is only 4.5 cm (1.8 in) long, and the total body length is estimated at 25 cm (9.8 in) based on the assumption that it had proportions similar to those of Ichthyostega and Acanthostega. This would make Brittagnathus the smallest known Devonian "tetrapod". A phylogenetic analysis places it among Carboniferous stegocephalians, particularly the small whatcheeriid Pederpes, rather than the contemporary Devonian stem-tetrapods. This provides support for an origin for Carboniferous-type tetrapods as early as the Devonian.
