= Korkonterpeton =

Korkonterpeton Temporal range: Asselian 298.9–293.5 Ma

Scientific classification
- Domain: Eukaryota
- Kingdom: Animalia
- Phylum: Chordata
- Order: †Temnospondyli
- Clade: †Stereospondylomorpha
- Genus: †Korkonterpeton; Werneberg, Štamberg & Steyer, 2020

Type species
- †Korkonterpeton kalnense Werneberg, Štamberg & Steyer, 2020

Extinct genus of temnospondyls

Korkonterpeton is a genus of temnospondyl from the Asselian of the Prosečné Formation. Its genus is named after the Celtic name for the Krkonoše Mountains of the Czech Republic and the Ancient Greek word ἑρπετόν (herpetón), which means reptile. Thus Korkonterpeton means "reptile of the Krkonoše Mountains". The type species, Korkonterpeton kalnense was described based on a partial skeleton with a large skull, which is visible in dorsal and palatal views. The postcranial skeleton is disarticulated but with well-preserved elements, including the vertebral column and the ribs.

The skull has a midline length of 15.7 cm, and shows clear ornamentation. The endocranium is also well-ossified. Because of these factors, and the fact that the ribs present uncinate processes and the vertebrae transverse processes, the authors conclude that MEBHK-P 82447, the type specimen, was an adult individual at time of death.
