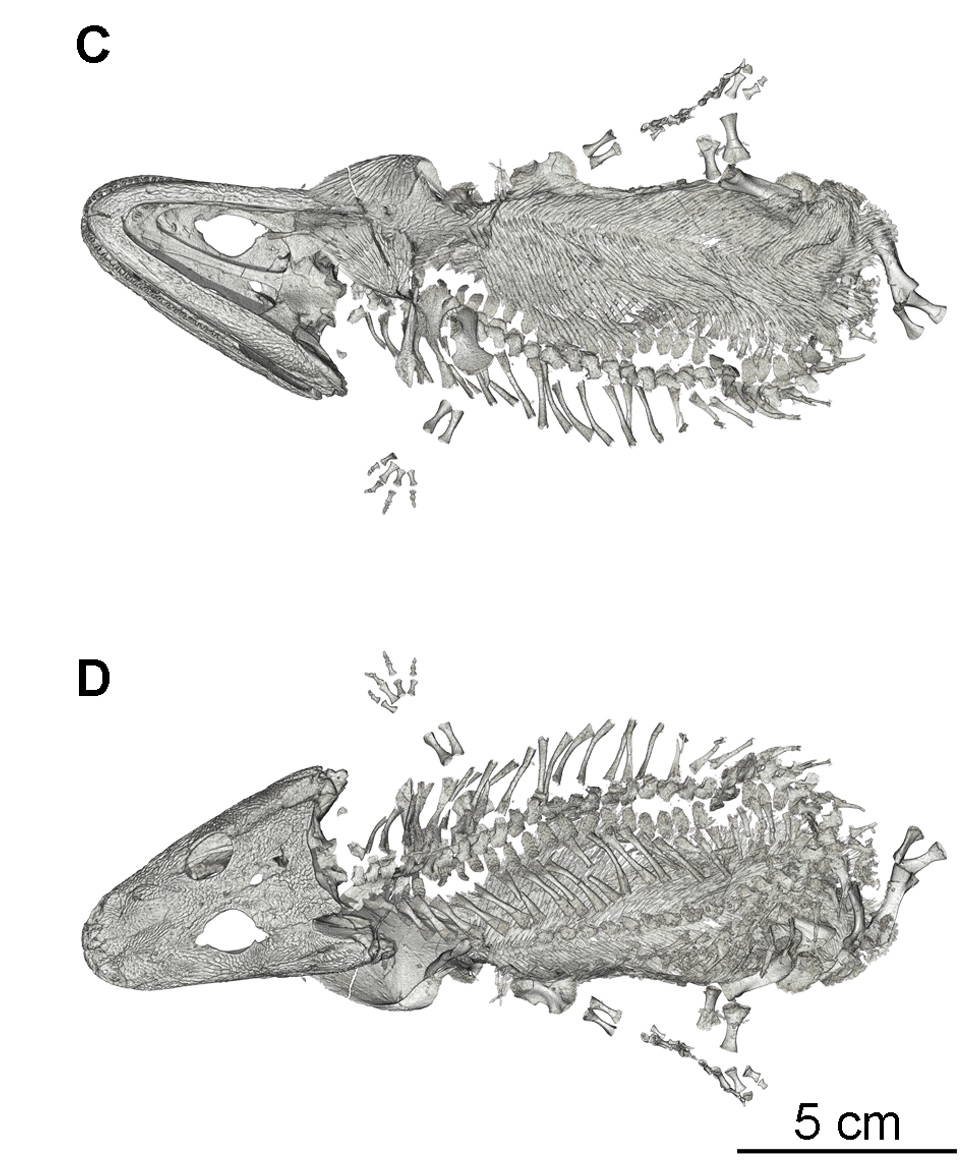
- Skeleton of a juvenile Broomistega putterilli shown in ventral (C) and dorsal (D) views

Scientific classification
- Kingdom: Animalia
- Phylum: Chordata
- Clade: Tetrapoda
- Order: †Temnospondyli
- Suborder: †Stereospondyli
- Family: †Rhinesuchidae
- Genus: †Broomistega; Shishkin and Rubidge, 2000

Type species
- Lydekkerina putterilli Broom, 1930

= Broomistega =

Broomistega Temporal range: Early Triassic, 251–249 Ma

Extinct genus of temnospondyl from the early Triassic

Broomistega is an extinct genus of temnospondyl in the family Rhinesuchidae. It is known from one species, Broomistega putterilli, which was renamed in 2000 from Lydekkerina putterilli Broom 1930. Fossils are known from the Early Triassic Lystrosaurus Assemblage Zone of the Beaufort Group in the Karoo Basin of present-day South Africa, a region that had been an enclave of Gondwana. Specimens of B. putterilli were once thought to represent young individuals of another larger rhinesuchid such as Uranocentrodon, but the species is now regarded as a paedomorphic taxon, possessing the features of juvenile rhinesuchids into adulthood.

In 2013, a well-preserved skeleton of Broomistega was discovered alongside the skeleton of the cynodont Thrinaxodon (a mammal relative) in a cast of a burrow. The individual probably entered the burrow while the cynodont was in a state of aestivation (dormancy), and afterwards a flash flood filled the burrow with sediment to preserve both bodies together.

== Paleobiology ==
Broomistega is the only rhinesuchid known from the Triassic Period. Its presence in the Early Triassic indicates that rhinesuchids survived the Permo-Triassic Mass Extinction about 252 million years ago. However, compared to the diversity of rhinesuchids that existed in the Permian Period, Broomistega is a very rare component of the Early Triassic Karoo fauna. It may have been the last surviving representative of the group, making it a relict taxon.

=== Association with Thrinaxodon ===
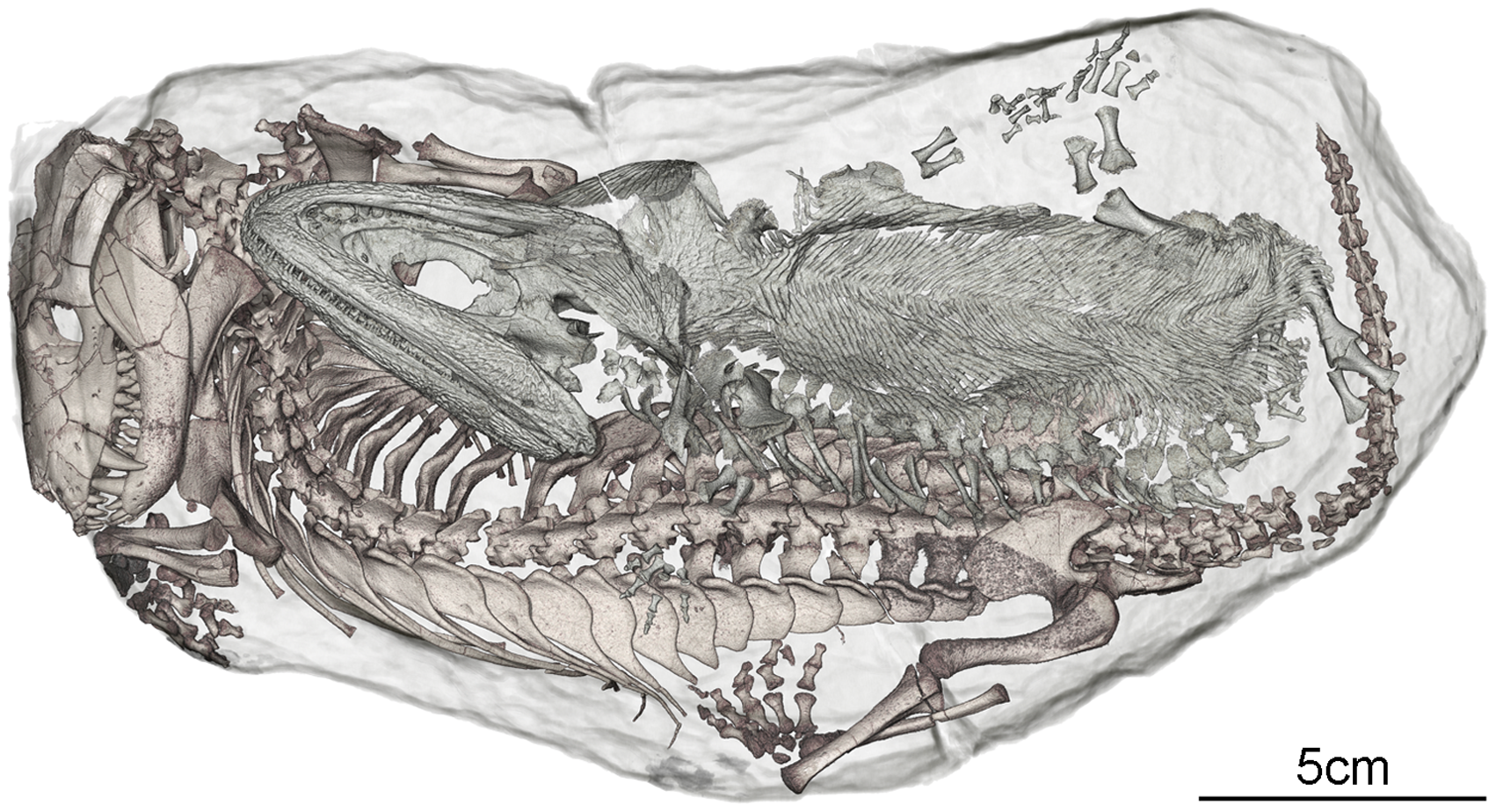
Thrinaxodon and Broomistega found in the same burrow

3D reconstruction of the Broomistega and Thrinaxodon skeletons on the basis of synchrotron imaging.

The most complete skeleton of Broomistega, specimen BP/1/7200, was discovered in the sandstone cast of a burrow (BP/1/5558) after the cast was scanned at the European Synchrotron Radiation Facility in 2013. The cast was first found in the Karoo Basin of South Africa by paleontologist James Kitching in 1975, but was left unprepared for many years. Part of a skull of a cynodont was exposed on the surface of the cast, allowing Kitching to attribute it to the genus Thrinaxodon. Only after the synchrotron scanning was the Broomistega skeleton found. All bones are preserved except for a few phalanges of the right hind foot, and nearly all of the bones are articulated as they were in life. The skeletons do not show evidence of stiffening due to rigor mortis after death, but are pressed against the sides of the burrow as the animals would have been when alive. The skeleton of BP/1/7200 is preserved belly-up, resting on the right side of the Thrinaxodon skeleton. This position was probably the result of the individual being pushed on top of the Thrinaxodon by floodwater entering the burrow.

Broomistega is not thought to have been a burrowing animal and was instead semiaquatic. The Thrinaxodon individual preserved in BP/1/5558 was probably the original occupant of the burrow, and the Broomistega individual probably entered the burrow later. The joints of BP/1/7200 are not well developed, indicating that the individual was a juvenile with large amounts of cartilage in its skeleton. Several ribs on the right side of the skeleton are broken, indicating that the individual was severely injured before entering the burrow, probably by being crushed. The animal was still alive when it entered the burrow because the rib fractures show evidence of healing, but the injury probably impacted its ability to breathe and to move about. Two holes are present on the skull roof of BP/1/7200. Although they resemble bite marks, they do not match with the teeth of the Thrinaxodon specimen.

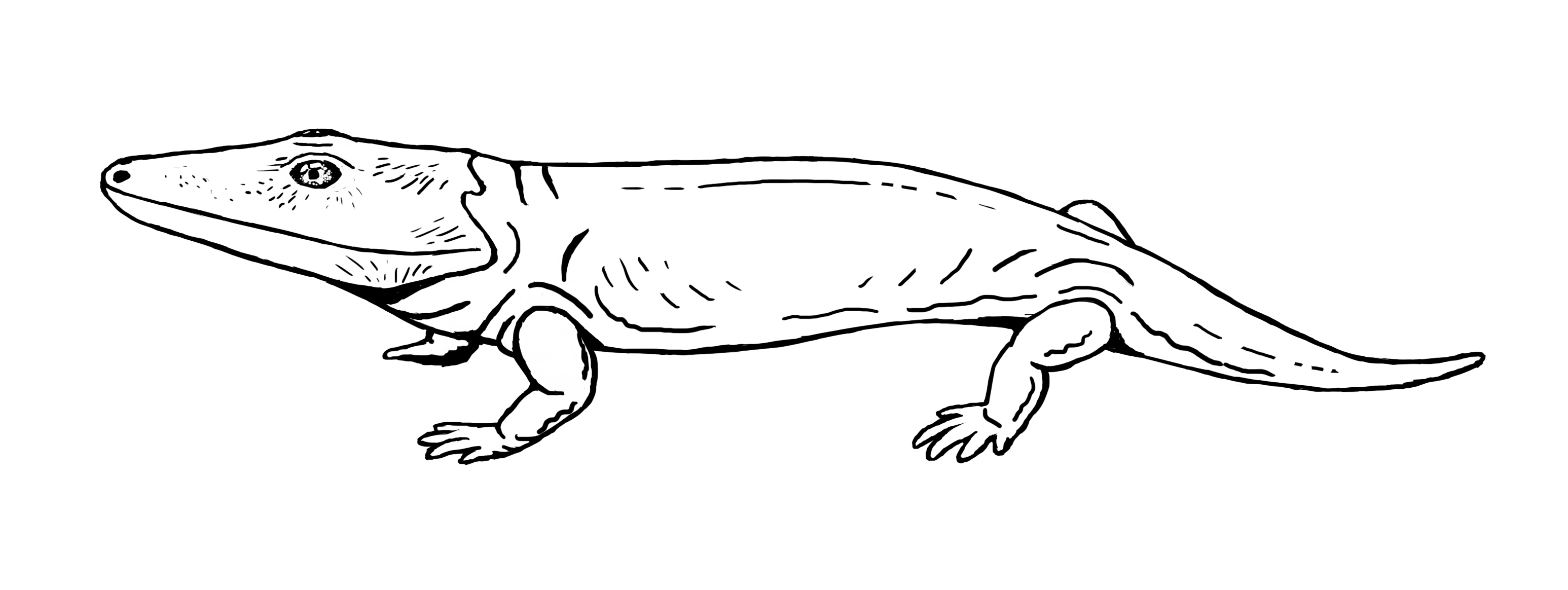
Restoration of an adult Broomistega putterilli

The presence of two different species of large vertebrates in the same burrow is unusual. Modern examples of this association are usually the result of predator-prey interactions (for example, a predator storing the body of its prey in the burrow) or mutualistic relationships whereby the original occupant gains protection from predators by the presence of the second inhabitant. However, the benefit of cohabitation usually only works when there are multiple burrows, casting doubt on the possibility that the Thrinaxodon was benefiting from the presence of the Broomistega. Because the Broomistega skeleton lacks any sign of damage caused by the Thrinaxodon, the two were probably not predator and prey. The most likely explanation for the association as of 2013 is that the Thrinaxodon tolerated the Broomistega or was unable to remove it, possibly because it was aestivating. As is the case with many modern amphibians, the Broomistega probably entered the burrow to seek temporary shelter. During the Early Triassic the Karoo Basin was seasonally arid, so the Thrinaxodon may have been aestivating to conserve energy during a time when resource availability was low and the normally aquatic Broomistega may have entered to burrow to escape the hot and dry conditions of its environment.
