= Laccosaurus =

Laccosaurus Temporal range: Lopingian

Scientific classification
- Kingdom: Animalia
- Phylum: Chordata
- Order: †Temnospondyli
- Suborder: †Stereospondyli
- Family: †Rhinesuchidae
- Genus: †Laccosaurus; Haughton, 1925

Type species
- †Laccosaurus watsoni Haughton, 1925

Extinct genus of temnospondyls

Laccosaurus is an extinct monotypic genus of rhinesuchid temnospondyl, the type species being Laccosaurus watsoni.

== History of study ==
Laccosaurus watsoni was named by paleontologist Sidney H. Haughton in 1925 on the basis of a largely complete skull from the Dicynodon-Theriognathus subzone of the Daptocephalus Assemblage Zone in South Africa. This genus and/or species has sometimes been synonymized with Uranocentrodon, but this framework has not been adopted by recent workers. However, there is uncertainty related to the single referred specimen (BPI/1/4473); Eltink et al. (2019) consider this to belong to a different taxon, while Marsicano et al. (2017) considered it to belong to L. watsoni.

== Anatomy ==
Marsicano et al. (2017) were the most recent to diagnose this taxon and list the following unique combination of characters: "well-developed sensory sulci, infra-orbital sulcus with a step/S- like flexure between the orbit and the naris; width of interpterygoid vacuity pair greater than 90% of their length; vomers with field of denticles in symmetrical raised patches medially to the choanae; straight transverse vomerine tooth row; quadrate condyles projected behind the tip of the tabular horns; parasphenoid plate subrectangular, longer than wide, with a flat ventral surface; well-developed ‘pockets’, close to each other, thus the cristae musculares converge in the midline."
