= Rhinesuchoides =

Rhinesuchoides Temporal range: Guadalupian-Lopingian

Scientific classification
- Kingdom: Animalia
- Phylum: Chordata
- Clade: Tetrapoda
- Order: †Temnospondyli
- Suborder: †Stereospondyli
- Family: †Rhinesuchidae
- Genus: †Rhinesuchoides; Olson & Broom, 1937

Type species
- Rhinesuchoides tenuiceps Olson & Broom, 1937

Other species
- R. capensis (Haughton, 1925)

Synonyms
- R. tenuiceps: Rhinesuchus avenanti Boonstra, 1940; Rhinesuchus rubidgei Boonstra, 1948; R. capensis: Rhinesuchus capensis Haughton, 1925

Extinct genus of temnospondyls

Rhinesuchoides is an extinct genus of temnospondyls in the family Rhinesuchidae. It contains two species, R. tenuiceps and R. capensis, both from the Karoo Supergroup of South Africa. The latter was formerly a species of Rhinesuchus.

== See also ==
- Prehistoric amphibian
- List of prehistoric amphibians
