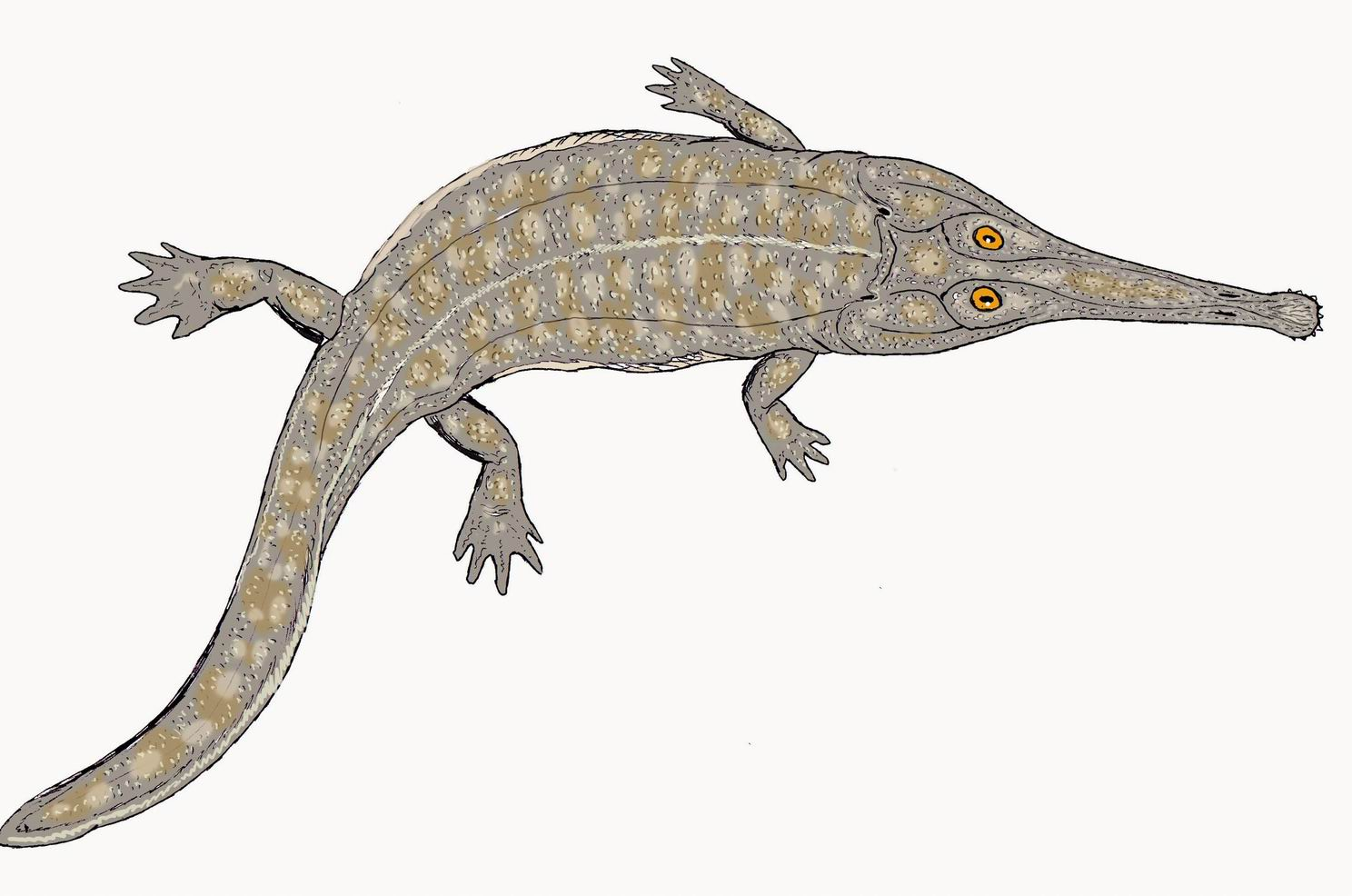

Scientific classification
- Domain: Eukaryota
- Kingdom: Animalia
- Phylum: Chordata
- Order: †Temnospondyli
- Suborder: †Stereospondyli
- Family: †Rhinesuchidae
- Genus: †Australerpeton; Barberena, 1998

Type species
- Australerpeton cosgriffi Barberena, 1998

= Australerpeton =

Australerpeton Temporal range: Late Permian, Lopingian

Extinct genus of temnospondyls

Australerpeton is an extinct genus of stereospondylomorph temnospondyl currently believed to belong to the family Rhinesuchidae. When first named in 1998, the genus was placed within the new family Australerpetontidae. However, studies published a few years later questioned the systematics used in the original description and included the genus within Archegosauridae. A study by Dias & Schultz (2003) reassigned Australerpeton to the family Rhinesuchidae within the suborder Stereospondyli based on an earlier evaluation of the family. In this study, the close similarities between Australerpeton and archegosaurids were attributed to convergent evolution as a result of similar semi-aquatic lifestyles. A redescription of the skeleton of this genus was published by Eltink & Langer in 2014, and the skull was redescribed in a follow-up study published by Eltink et al. in 2016. These studies, as well as a 2017 study focusing on rhinesuchids in general, confirmed that Australerpeton was a rhinesuchid rather than an archegosaurid. Fossils of the genus have been found in the Rio do Rasto Formation of Brazil.
