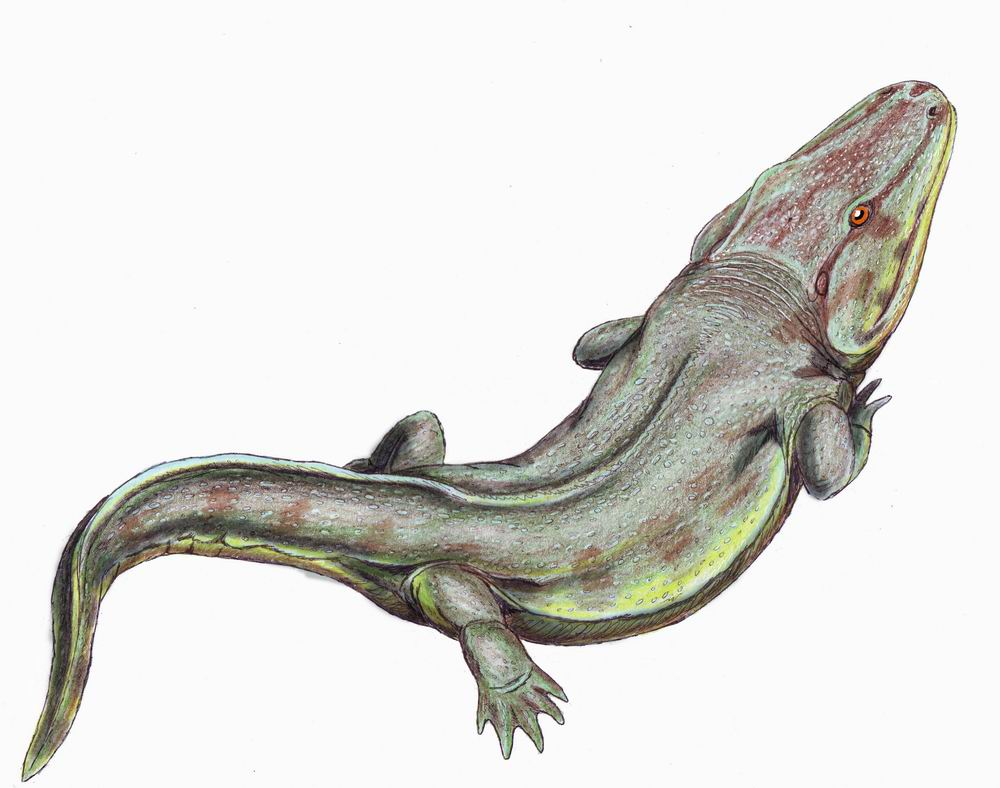
- Restoration of Rhinesuchus

Scientific classification
- Kingdom: Animalia
- Phylum: Chordata
- Clade: Tetrapoda
- Order: †Temnospondyli
- Suborder: †Stereospondyli
- Family: †Rhinesuchidae
- Genus: †Rhinesuchus; Broom, 1908

Type species
- †Rhinesuchus whaitsi Broom, 1908

Synonyms
- †R. beaufortensis Boonstra, 1940; †R. broomianus von Huene, 1931; †Muchocephalus muchos Watson, 1962

= Rhinesuchus =

Rhinesuchus Temporal range: Guadalupian

Extinct genus of temnospondyls

Rhinesuchus (meaning "rasp crocodile" for the ridged surface texture on its skull bones) is a large temnospondyl. Remains of the genus are known from the Permian of the South African Karoo Basin's Tapinocephalus and Cistecephalus assemblage zones, both belonging to the Beaufort Group. The skull of Rhinesuchus had a flat triangular shape with blunt snout similar to some of the other large temnospondyls, and had a palate filled with small sharp teeth, suggesting that it hunted fish. Also, the small eyes were on top of the head suggesting that it approached its prey from below.

== Etymology ==
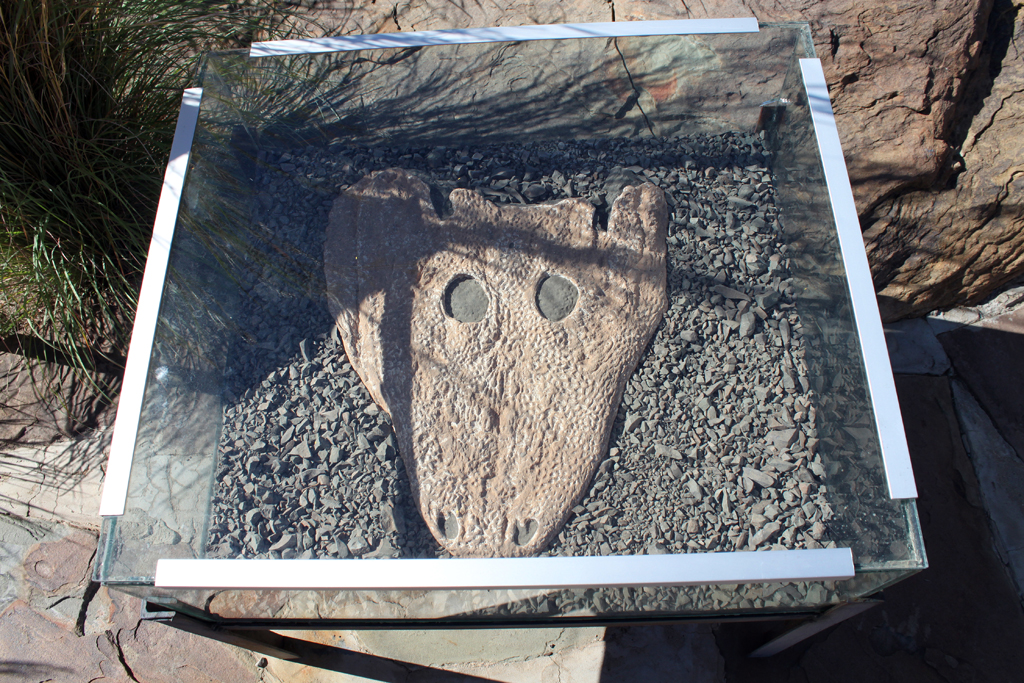
Rhinesuchus skull in situ

The name Rhinesuchus comes from Greek ῥίνη (rhinē) "file, rasp" plus σούχος (soukhos) "crocodile" for the skull surface texture: "The upper cranial bones are ornamented by a rather fine reticulation of sharp ridges". (The name does not mean "nose crocodile" (as if from Greek rhis, rhinos "nose") or refer to the Rhine River in Germany.)

== Description ==
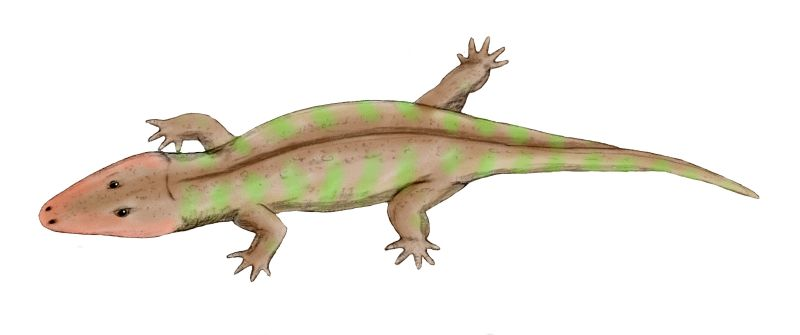
Restoration of Rhinesuchus

Rhinesuchus whaitsi probably reached a mass of 100 kg. Counts of lines of arrested growth (LAGs) indicate that like many amphibians, Rhinesuchus grew seasonally and was able to live more than 30 years. They also indicate that Rhinesuchus was able to sustain prolonged periods of stress, either climatic or nutritional, and that portions of its skeleton may have experienced more sustained growth.

== Taxonomy ==
The type species is Rhinesuchus whaitsi. Two more species, R. africanus and R. wadiai, are considered to be nomina dubia. R. broomianus and R. beaufortensis have been synonymized with R. whaitsi, while R. capensis has been moved out of the genus into Rhinesuchoides. Muchocephalus has also been synonymized with R. whaitsi.

Rhinesuchus major (Broom, 1911) from the Free State was later synonymized with Uranocentrodon senekalensis.

The first rhinesuchid from outside southern Africa was described as Rhinesuchus wolgodvinensis (Yacovlev, 1916). The specimen, collected from Early Triassic beds from Russia, was considered the first Rhinesuchus from the Triassic, although currently it is considered, instead, a wetlugasaurid.
