= External gills =

Gills set away from the body

External gills are the gills of an animal, most typically an amphibian, that are exposed to the environment, rather than set inside the pharynx and covered by gill slits, as they are in most fishes. Instead, the respiratory organs are set on a frill of stalks protruding from the sides of an animal's head.

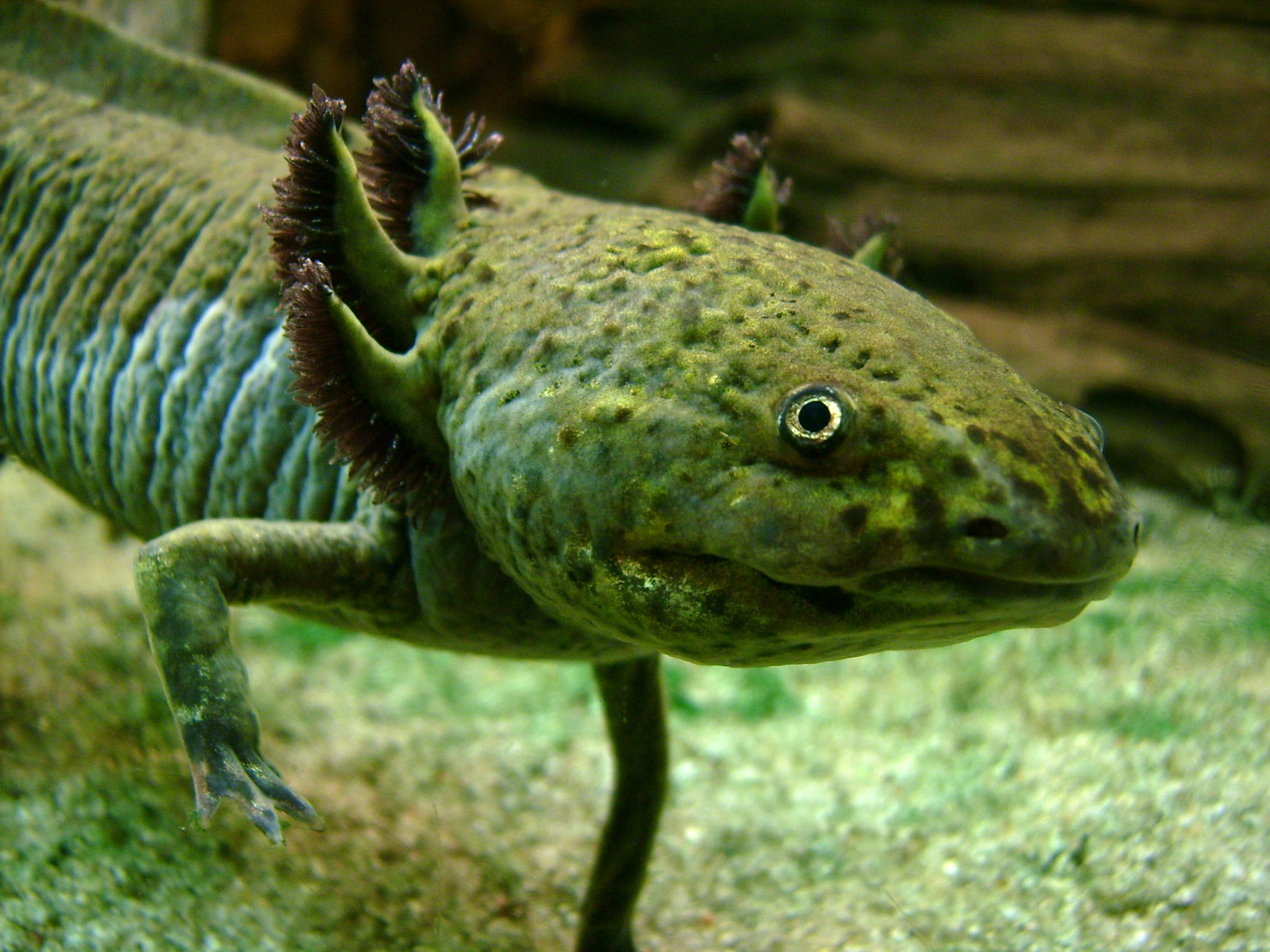
The axolotl has three pairs of external gills.

This type of gill is most commonly observed on the aquatic larva of most species of salamanders, lungfish, and bichirs (which have only one large pair), and are retained by neotenic adult salamanders and some species of adult lungfish. They are present on non-transforming salamander species, such as most members of the family Proteidae (the olm and mudpuppies) and the family Sirenidae, which naturally never metamorphose into an air-breathing form. The embryos of frogs and caecilians also develop external gills at some point in their development, though these are either reabsorbed before or disappear shortly after hatching. Fossils of the distant relatives of modern amphibians, such as Branchiosaurus and Apateon, also show evidence of external gills.

The external gills commonly consist of a single stalk (rami) protruding from a gill arch behind the head of the animal, above an associated gill slit. The stalk usually contains muscle tissue, and may be moved by the animal as a free appendage, in order to stir up stagnant water. The stalk is lined by many thinly walled filaments (fimbriae), containing the majority of blood vessels used in gas exchange. Animals usually have one external gill originating on each gill arch (except the hyoid), which leads to there being three pairs of external gills in salamanders, and four in the gilled larvae of lungfish.

Arboreal embryos maintained large external gills under hatching, under natural conditions. Once hatched, tadpoles enter the water and the external gills began to fully regress within 24 hours.
