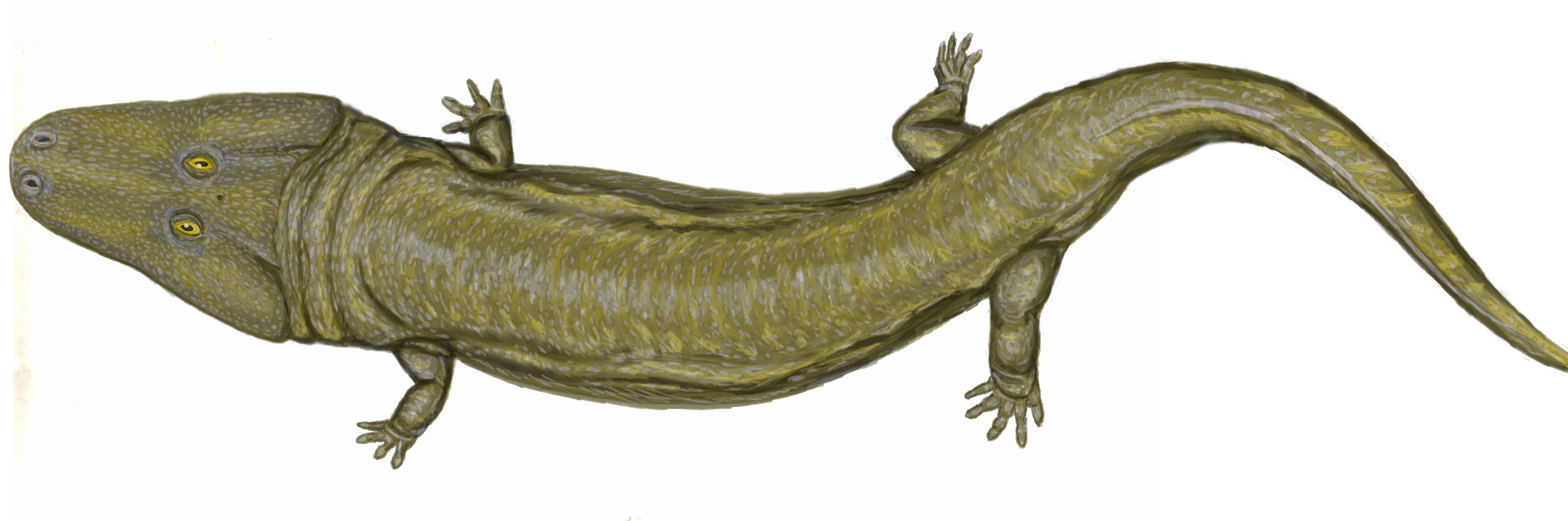
- Reconstruction

Scientific classification
- Domain: Eukaryota
- Kingdom: Animalia
- Phylum: Chordata
- Order: †Temnospondyli
- Suborder: †Stereospondyli
- Family: †Rhinesuchidae
- Genus: †Uranocentrodon van Hoepen, 1917

Type species
- †Uranocentrodon senekalensis (van Hoepen, 1911)

Synonyms
- Myriodon senekalensis van Hoepen, 1911 (preoccupied); Rhinesuchus major Broom, 1911

= Uranocentrodon =

Uranocentrodon Temporal range: Changhsingian259.9–252.2 Ma

Extinct genus of temnospondyls

Uranocentrodon is an extinct genus of temnospondyls in the family Rhinesuchidae. Known from a 50 centimetres (20 in) skull, Uranocentrodon was a large predator with a length up to 3.75 metres (12.3 ft). Originally named Myriodon by van Hoepen in 1911, it was transferred to a new genus on account of the name being preoccupied in 1917. It has been synonymized with Rhinesuchus, but this has not been widely supported. It was also originally considered to be of Triassic age, but more recent analysis has placed its age as just below the Permian-Triassic boundary.

== History and specimens ==
Fossils of the animal now known as Uranocentrodon were first discovered in a sandstone quarry in the Normandien Formation near Senekal in Free State, South Africa. The first example of these fossils was a fragmentary skull excavated by a local family. Subsequent excavations and searches undertaken by various parties unearthed more specimens which hailed from the quarry. Among these specimens included three nearly complete skeletons overlapping each other. The initial skull was determined to belong to the same individual as one of the skeletons. The skull and three skeletons were acquired by the Transvaal Museum and given the designations TM 75, TM 75d, and TM75h by E.C.N. van Hoepen. In 1911, he gave the formal name Myriodon senekalensis to the specimens by means of a brief description published in Dutch. He published a more comprehensive description a few years later in 1915. Two additional skulls were mentioned in this description, although their whereabouts are currently unknown. In 1917 it was determined that the name Myriodon was already in use by a genus of fish, and that a new name had to be used. Thus, van Hoepen renamed Myriodon senekalensis to Uranocentrodon senekalensis, which roughly translates to "prickle-toothed palate of Senekal". The original Transvaal Museum specimens have collectively been termed the syntypes of Uranocentrodon.

Over time, additional remains were discovered. Around the same time as the Transvaal specimens were being described, Robert Broom discovered skull fragments which he considered to belong to a new species of Rhinesuchus, 'Rhinesuchus major'. However, this skull (given the designation 60C 1-1a) is now believed to belong to Uranocentrodon, rendering R. major a junior synonym of the genus.

In 1915, Sidney Haughton, decided to synonymize Uranocentrodon (at that time still called Myriodon) with Rhinesuchus, although he kept it as a separate species within the genus. He also described another practically complete skeleton (including skull material) kept at the Bloemfontein Museum, a specimen now designated as NMQR 1483. He also mentioned a jaw fragment, now known as SAM-PK-2783. Most other analyses consider Uranocentrodon to be distinct from Rhinesuchus. Other known remains include TM 185 (a skull described by Broom in 1930), TM 208 (a right forelimb), and CGP 4095 (another skull).

== Paleobiology ==
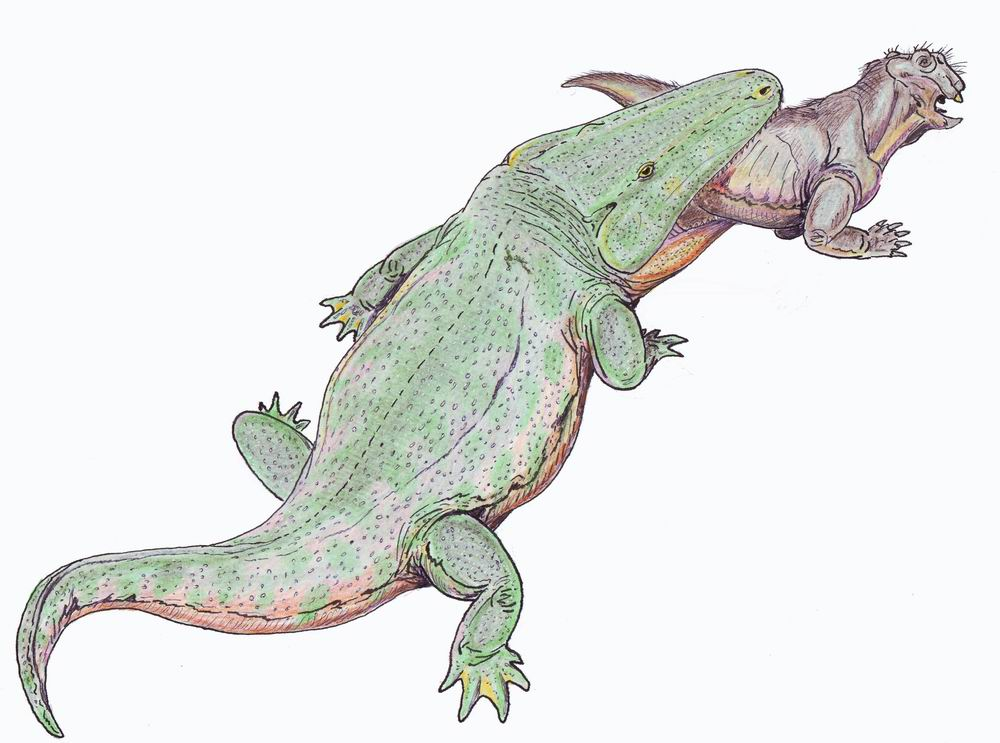
Uranocentrodon senekalensis attacking a lystrosaur

=== Gills ===
The exquisite preservation of the original Transvaal skeletons allowed for delicate parts of the skeleton to be preserved. Among these parts include approximately three rows of tiny bones (branchial ossicles) covered with thin tooth-like structures (branchial denticles). These structures appeared near the neck of one of the skeletons, and almost certainly attached to the branchial arches of gills while the animal was alive. Although such bones are rare among stereospondyls and unknown in any other rhinesuchids, this may simply be due to the fact that the bones of other genera were preserved in more rough-grained sediments where such delicate bones could be broken or difficult to find.

Although evidently Uranocentrodon had gills of some kind, it is difficult to determine what kind of gills they were. On the one hand, they could have been internal gills like those of fish, which were hardly visible from the outside of the body. On the other hand, they could have been stalk-like external gills like those of modern salamander larvae or even neotenic adult salamanders such as the mudpuppy or axolotl. External gills had to have evolved from internal gills sometime during amphibian evolution, although the precise location of this transition is controversial. The gill-supporting bones preserved in ancient amphibians show many similarities with those of fish gills and salamander gills. Depending on which of these groups paleontologists compare the bones to, different types of gills can be inferred. This conundrum, known as Bystrow's paradox, has made it difficult to assess gills in ancient amphibians such as Uranocentrodon.

Bystrow's paradox was finally resolved by a 2010 study. This study found that grooved ceratobrachnial structures (components of the branchial arches) are correlated with internal gills. Ancient tetrapods which preserved grooved ceratobranchials, such as the dvinosaur Dvinosaurus, probably only had internal gills as adults. Nevertheless, external gills have been directly preserved as soft tissue in some temnospondyls. However, these situations only occur in larval specimens or members of specialized groups such as the branchiosaurids. One living species of lungfish (Lepidosiren) has external gills as larvae which transform into internal gills as adults. Despite adult dvinosaur specimens having skeletal features correlated with internal gills, some larval specimens of another dvinosaur, Isodectes preserved soft tissue external gills. Thus, the gill development of dvinosaurs (and presumably other temnospondyls, such as Uranocentrodon) mirrored that of Lepidosiren. Despite this feature likely being an example of convergent evolution (as other lungfish exclusively possessed internal gills), it still remains a useful gauge for how temnospondyl gills developed. In conclusion, Uranocentrodon's gills were probably internal (like those of a fish) as an adult, but external (like those of a salamander) as a larva.

=== Body armor ===
Some of the Transvaal specimens also preserved large patches of bony scutes or scales around the body. The scutes on the belly of the animal were arranged in parallel diagonal rows which converged at the midline of the body and diverged as the rows stretched towards the tail. Each scute had a ridge running down the middle, and the scutes further towards the midline overlapped the ones further out. Along the midline, a row of flat and wide scales stretched from the throat to the tail. While these belly scales were made of bone, scales on other parts of the body had less bone structure and were probably made of keratin instead.

The scales on the sides of the body were flatter and smaller than the bony belly scutes. The scutes on the back of the body were similar, although more rounded in shape, with a few larger scutes near the midline. The scales of the hind limbs and the underside of the hip region were similar to those of the back, although no integument was preserved on the forelimbs or tail. Thus, it is likely that at least the tail was unarmored and only covered with naked skin.
