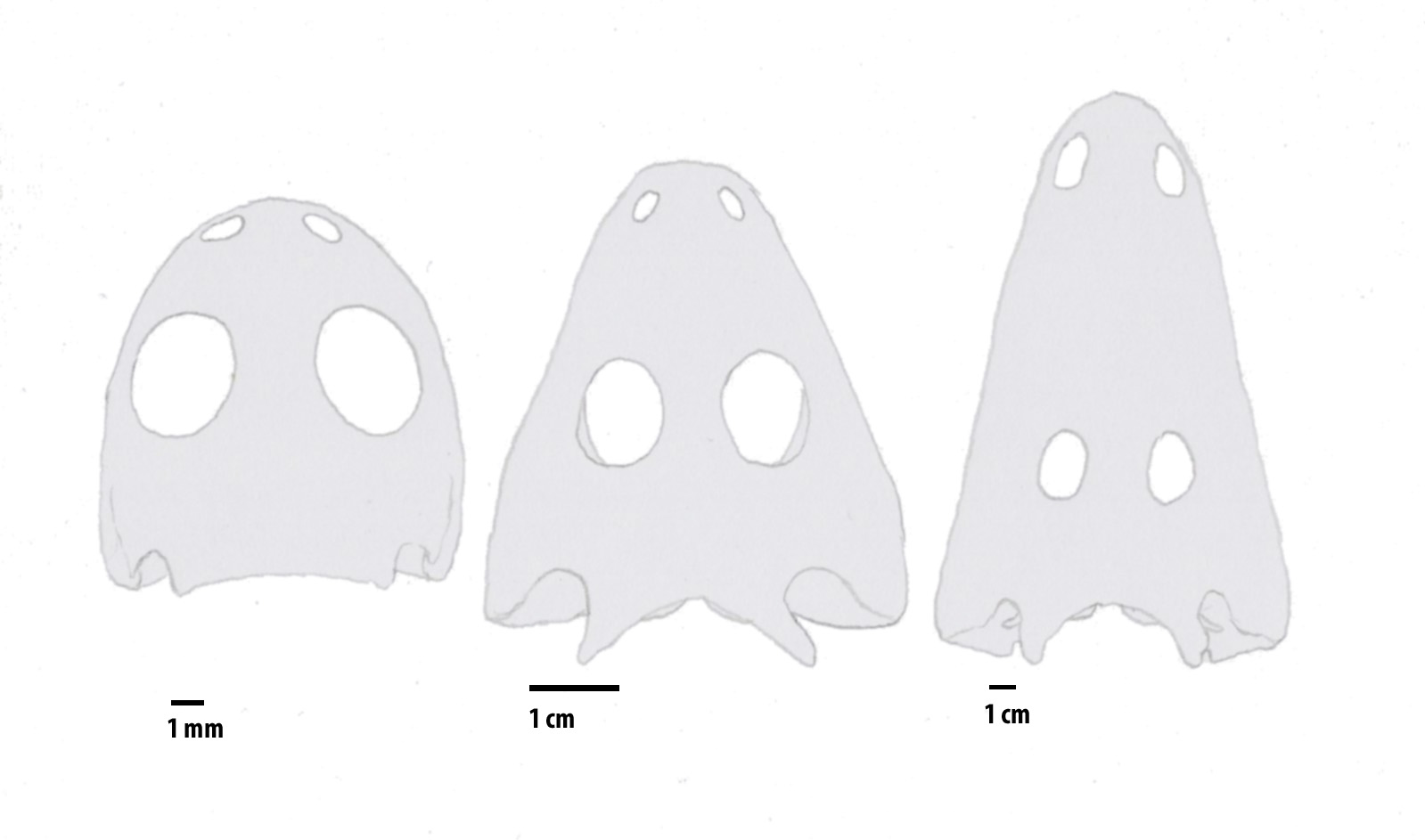
- Skulls at various ontogenic stages

Scientific classification
- Kingdom: Animalia
- Phylum: Chordata
- Clade: Tetrapoda
- Order: †Temnospondyli
- Suborder: †Stereospondyli
- Clade: †Capitosauria
- Genus: †Warrenisuchus; Maganuco et al., 2009

Type species
- †Warrenisuchus aliciae (Warren and Hutchinson, 1988) (originally Parotosuchus aliciae)

= Warrenisuchus =

Warrenisuchus Temporal range: Lowermost Late Triassic (Carnian) ~236 Ma

Extinct genus of temnospondyls

Warrenisuchus is an extinct genus of temnospondyl from the Late Triassic Duckworth Creek locality of the Arcadia Formation, Queensland, Australia. It belongs to a diverse group of Triassic temnospondyls called Capitosauria. The type species Warrenisuchus aliciae was erected in 2009. W. aliciae was originally described as a species of Parotosuchus in 1988, which is known from other species that have been found in Europe, Africa, and Antarctica. In 2000 it was then assigned to a new genus called Rewanobatrachus along with the newly named species R. gunganj, which was declared the type species of the genus. However, R. gunganj was later reclassified as a species of Watsonisuchus, invalidating the name Rewanobatrachus and requiring that R. aliciae be placed in its own genus, which was named Warrenisuchus. However, several studies suggest that Warrenisuchus aliciae may be a species of Watsonisuchus as well. Unlike most capitosaurs, Warrenisuchus is known from many juvenile skulls less than 4 centimetres (1.6 in) in length.

== Description ==
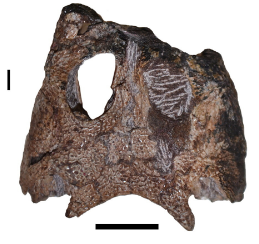
Holotype skull

Warrenisuchus is known from several fossil specimens. The holotype skeleton preserves most of the skull and lower jaws, the pectoral girdle, the forward-most vertebrae and ribs, and the right hind limb and the paratype specimen includes a partial skull and pectoral girdle. All known specimens of Warrenisuchus are very small; the largest skull is only 3.9 centimetres (1.5 in) long and the smallest is 1.1 centimetres (0.43 in) long (adult capitosaurs can have skulls over a meter in length). They show many characteristics of juvenile individuals such as large eye sockets, rounded heads (adult capitosaurs typically have triangular heads), loose joints between skull bones, small tabular horns, and pineal foramina close to the back of the eye sockets (as opposed to farther back on the skull table). The smallest specimens seem to represent the stage of development immediately after metamorphosis when gills have been lost and the skull bones have thickened but the vertebrae remain poorly developed.

== Classification ==
=== Phylogeny ===
Below is a cladogram from Maganuco et al. (2009):

- Capitosauria
  - Sclerothorax hypselonotus
  - - Warrenisuchus aliciae
    - - Edingerella madagascariensis
      - - - Watsonisuchus gunganj
          - - Watsonisuchus magnus
            - Watsonisuchus rewanensis
        - - Wetlugasaurus angustifrons
          - - Parotosuchus orenburgensis
            - - - Stanocephalosaurus pronus
                - Cyclotosauridae
                  - Cyclotosaurus robustus
                  - Tatrasuchus wildi
              - - Stenotosaurus stantonensis
                - - Xenotosuchus africanus
                  - - Cherninia denwai
                    - - Wellesaurus peabodyi
                      - - Paracyclotosaurus davidi
                        - - Heylerosauridae
                            - Eocyclotosaurus
                            - Odenwaldia heidelbergensis
                          - Mastodonsauridae
                            - Mastodonsaurus giganteus
                            - - Eryosuchus garjainovi
                              - - Yuanansuchus laticeps
                                - Quasicyclotosaurus campi

== Paleoenvironment ==
Warrenisuchus fossils are the most common components of an amphibian fauna that existed in eastern Australia during the Early Triassic. They are preserved in the Arcadia Formation, which dates back to the Induan stage. Other temnospondyl amphibians from the Arcadia Formation include rhytidosteids and brachyopoids. Another amphibian fauna existed around the same time in western Australia and includes a greater diversity of brachyopoids along with rhytidosteids, trematosaurids, and the capitosaur Edingerella, which was a close relative of Warrenisuchus.
