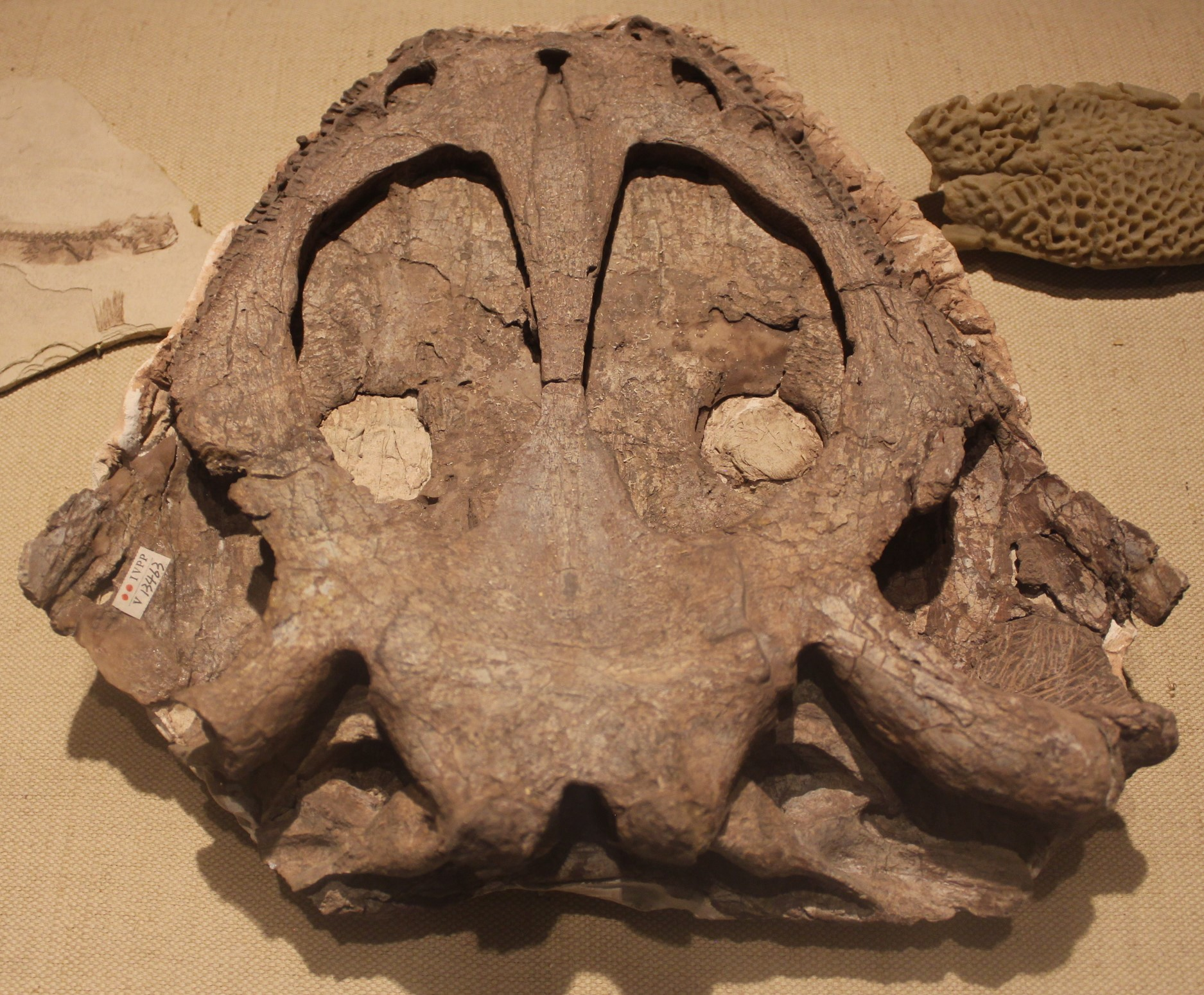
- Holotype skull, Paleozoological Museum of China

Scientific classification
- Kingdom: Animalia
- Phylum: Chordata
- Clade: Tetrapoda
- Order: †Temnospondyli
- Suborder: †Stereospondyli
- Clade: †Capitosauria
- Family: †Heylerosauridae
- Genus: †Yuanansuchus; Liu and Wang, 2005

Species
- Y. laticeps Liu and Wang, 2005 (type); Y. maopingchangensis Liu, 2016

= Yuanansuchus =

Yuanansuchus Temporal range: Anisian

Extinct genus of temnospondyls

Yuanansuchus is an extinct genus of mastodonsauroid temnospondyl. Fossils have been found from the Badong Formation (formerly the Xinlingzhen Formation of the Badong Group) in Yuan'an County, Hubei, China and date back to the Anisian stage of the Middle Triassic.

== History of study ==
The type species, Y. laticeps, was described by Liu & Wang (2005) based on a nearly complete skull collected from near Maopingchang village. The generic epithet derives from the county name and the Latin suchus ("crocodile"). The species epithet derives from the Latin latus ("broad") and ceps ("head").

Liu (2016) described a second species, Y. maopingchangensis, from a locality about 300 m away from the type locality of Y. laticeps and within approximately the same stratigraphic interval in the Badong Formation. The species epithet refers to Maopingchang village.

== Anatomy ==
The anatomy of Y. laticeps is only known from the nearly complete holotype skull, which comprises a mixture of plesiomorphic traits (prefrontal-postfrontal contact; flat and broad cultriform process of the parasphenoid) and apomorphic traits (occipital sensory groove; laterally directed tabular horn that posteriorly borders an open otic notch). Autapomorphies include a skull wider than it is long and with a nearly straight occipital margin and an orbit fully visible in palatal view.

The anatomy of Y. maopingchangensis is more comprehensively known, with at least six individuals represented among the specimens assigned to the taxon; the material includes hemimandibular and pectoral elements as well. Based on this second taxon, Liu amended the genus diagnosis: (1) postorbital portion of skull is more than 1/3 of skull length; (2) tabular horn directed laterally; (3) lateral line sulci continuous and well-developed; (4) the supraorbital sensory canal enters lacrimal; (5) the preorbital projection of the jugal is shorter than half the snout length; (6) vomerine plate short; (7) interclavicle wider than long; and (8) ventral part of blade of clavicle with convex medial margin. Yuanansuchus maopingchangensis is differentiated from Y. laticeps by having a proportionately narrower skull, larger orbits, a closed otic notch, a more posteriorly extensive frontal that enters the orbit, a closed otic notch, and a less anteriorly extensive cultriform process, and in lacking the fodia vomeris. These differences are in spite of the similar skull length of the holotypes of both taxa. Liu noted some variation in newly collected specimens attributed to Y. maopingchangensis in that two smaller specimens lack the frontal-orbit contact found in the holotype.

== Phylogenetic relationships ==
The analysis of Y. laticeps by Liu & Wang (2005) recovered the taxon as the sister taxon to a grouping of Eocyclotosaurus and Quasicyclotosaurus. In the framework of Capitosauria at the time, Liu and Wang considered Yuanansuchus to be a heylerosaurid. Subsequent analysis by Liu (2016) using multiple matrices and analytical methods consistently recovered the genus as monophyletic, but the relationship of the genus to other capitosaurs was inconsistent. In a lightly modified version of the matrix of Sidor et al. (2014), derived from Fortuny et al. (2011) and Damiani (2001), Yuanansuchus formed a polytomy with Xenotosuchus and a clade that includes Antarctosuchus, Cherninia, Eocyclotosaurus, Paracyclotosaurus, Procyclotosaurus, Quasicyclotosaurus, and Stanocephalosaurus. Conversely, in a new matrix that mainly combines the matrix of Fortuny et al. with that of Schoch (2008), Yuanansuchus is the sister taxon to Tatrasuchus (viz. T. wildi), and this pair is the sister to a clade including most of the aforementioned taxa but also Cyclotosaurus and Mastodonsaurus.

== See also ==
- Prehistoric amphibian
- List of prehistoric amphibians
