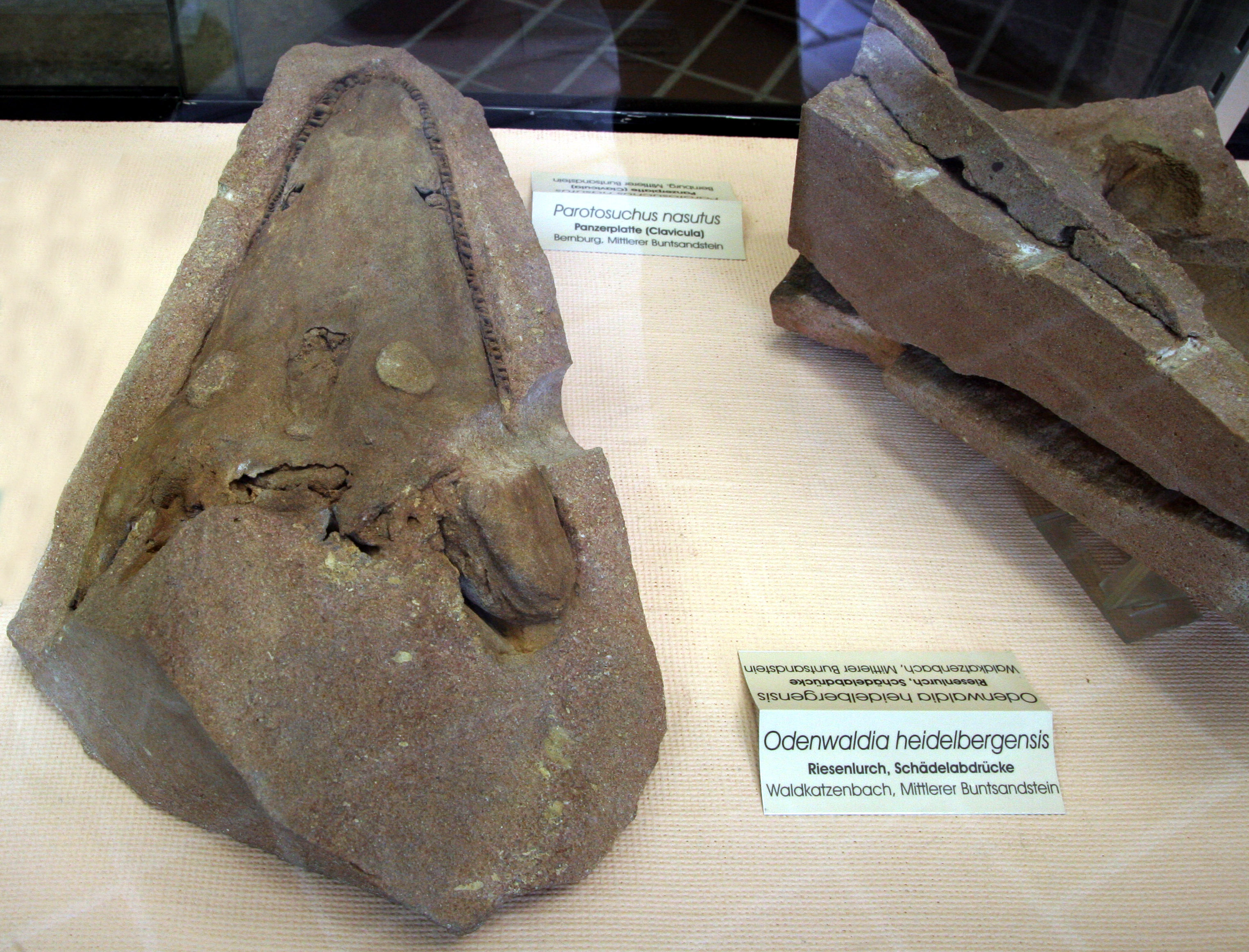
- Fossil of Odenwaldia heidelbergensis in Heidelberg University

Scientific classification
- Kingdom: Animalia
- Phylum: Chordata
- Clade: Tetrapoda
- Order: †Temnospondyli
- Suborder: †Stereospondyli
- Clade: †Capitosauria
- Family: †Heylerosauridae
- Genus: †Odenwaldia; Morales and Kamphausen, 1984

Species
- Odenwaldia heidelbergensis Morales and Kamphausen, 1984 (type)

= Odenwaldia =

Odenwaldia Temporal range: Middle Triassic

Extinct genus of temnospondyls

Odenwaldia is an extinct genus of mastodonsauroid temnospondyl within the family Heylerosauridae.

== History of study ==
Odenwaldia is only known from one species, O. heidelbergensis, and was named by Morales & Kamphausen (1984). The holotype, a skull roof and counterpiece cast, were collected from the Middle Bundsandstein (Oberes Konglomerat) near Heidelberg, Germany and were first described by Wilhelm Simon in 1961, who thought that the specimen belonged to the trematosaur Trematosaurus. It was then redescribed by Schoch (2008).

== Description ==
The holotype is the only uncontroversial specimen of this taxon, although others have been referred to the species. Odenwaldia is diagnosed by several autapomorphies, including (1) small orbits combined with broad interorbital distance; (2) preorbital region slender, with nasals and lacrimals narrower than frontals; and (3) dermal ornament consists of small, similarly sized polygons, but no elongated ridges. In contrast to most other capitosaurs, it has a laterally extensive postorbital and a contact between the prefrontal and the postfrontal.

== Classification ==
Morales and Kamphausen originally proposed that Odenwaldia represented an intermediary form between Benthosuchus and Eocyclotosaurus, but this was in part based on the outdated concept of Capitosauria (Benthosuchus is now regarded as a trematosaur) and did not involve a phylogenetic analysis. Subsequent phylogenetic analyses recover Odenwaldia securely within Capitosauria and perhaps within Capitosauroidea specifically, as an early diverging taxon in either instance.

Below is the phylogeny of Fortuny et al. (2011):

- - Lydekkerina huxleyi
  - Rhinesuchidae
    - Rhineceps nyasaensis
    - Uranocentrodon senekalensis
  - - Capitosauria
      - Wetlugasaurus angustifrons
      - - - Odenwaldia heidelbergensis
          - Vladlenosaurus alexeyevi
        - - - - Edingerella madagascariensis
              - Watsonisuchus spp.
            - - Xenotosuchus africanus
              - - Cherninia denwai
                - - Paracyclotosaurus crookshanki
                  - - - Stanocephalosaurus pronus
                      - Stanocephalosaurus birdi
                    - - Procyclotosaurus stantonensis
                      - - Eocyclotosaurus spp.
                        - Quasicyclotosaurus campi
          - - Parotosuchus orenburgensis
            - - Calmasuchus acri
              - - - Cyclotosaurus robustus
                  - Tatrasuchus wildi
                - - Eryosuchus garjainovi
                  - Mastodonsaurus giganteus
    - Trematosauria
      - Benthosuchus sushkini
      - Trematosauroidea
        - Thoosuchus yakovlevi
        - - Angusaurus spp.
          - Trematosaurus brauni

== See also ==
- Prehistoric amphibian
- List of prehistoric amphibians
