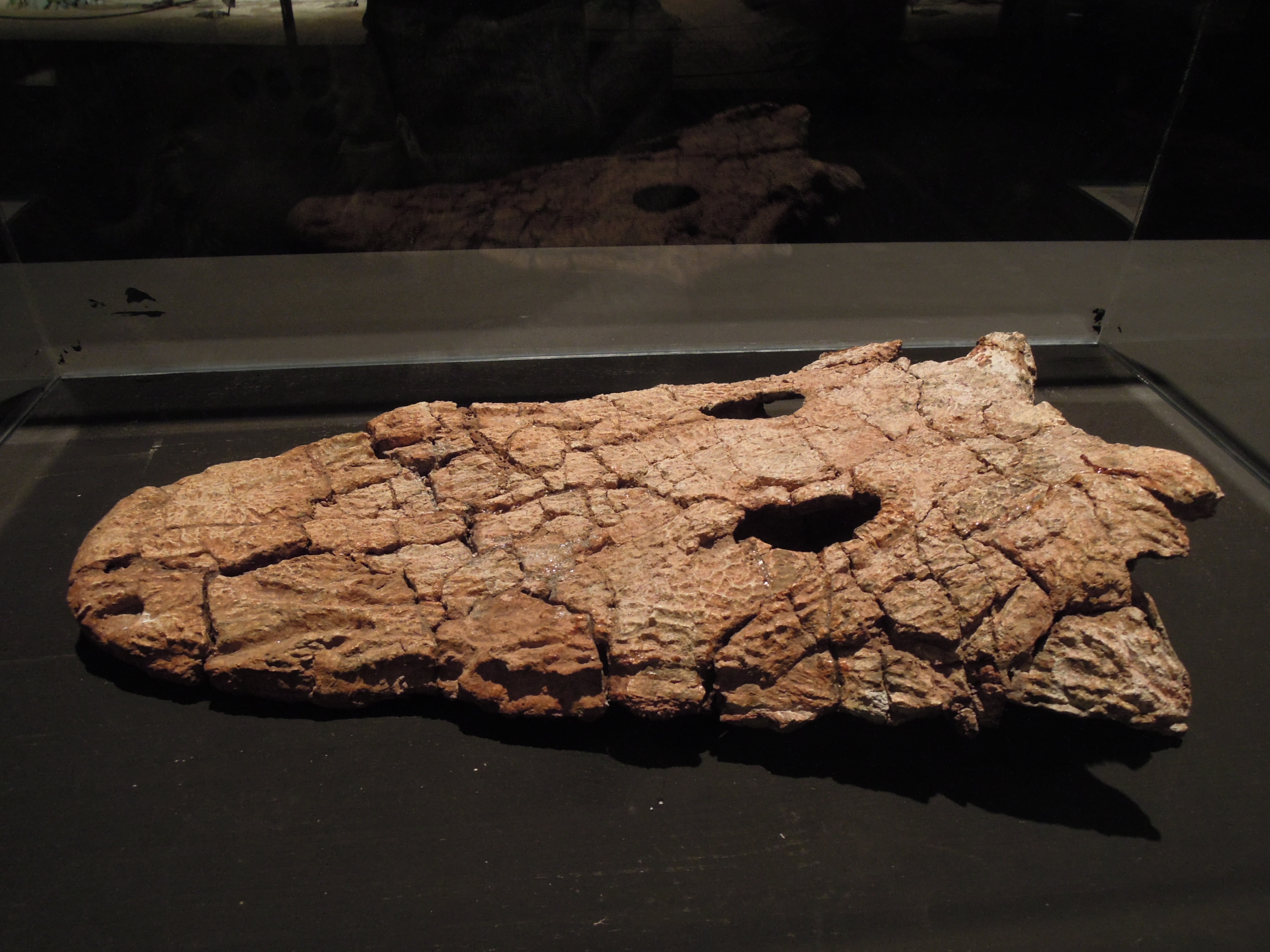
- E. tverdochlebovi skull

Scientific classification
- Kingdom: Animalia
- Phylum: Chordata
- Clade: Tetrapoda
- Order: †Temnospondyli
- Suborder: †Stereospondyli
- Clade: †Capitosauria
- Family: †Mastodonsauridae
- Genus: †Eryosuchus; Otschev, 1966

Species
- †E. tverdochlebovi Otschev, 1966 (type); †E. garjainovi Otschev, 1966

= Eryosuchus =

Eryosuchus Temporal range: Middle Triassic, ~246.7–237 Ma

Extinct genus of temnospondyls

Eryosuchus is an extinct genus of capitosauroid temnospondyl from the Middle Triassic of northern Russia. It was a very large predator: the largest specimen known could reach up to 3.5 m (11.5 ft) in length, with a skull over 1 m long.

== History of study ==
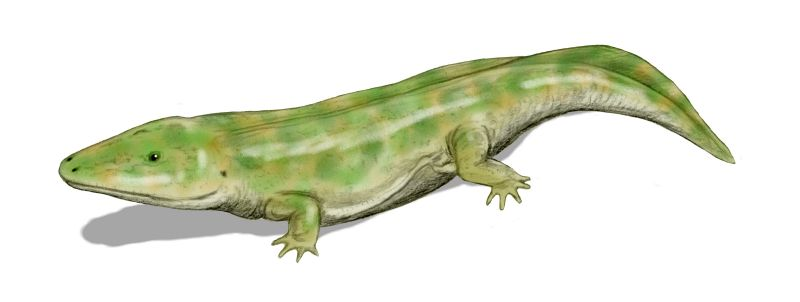
Restoration

Eryosuchus was named by Ochev (1966) based on the type species, E. tverdochlebovi from exposures of the Donguz Formation in Orenburgskaya Oblast. In the same publication, Ochev also named E. garjainovi and E. antiquus, both from the same formation and oblast as E. tverdochlebovi. Several other species previously placed in other genera have sometimes been placed in Eryosuchus, such as "Stanocephalosaurus" pronus from Tanzania and "Stanocephalosaurus" rajareddyi from India, but this is largely disputed, as is the validity of E. antiquus, which is only based on a lower jaw fragment. These species, as well as more confidently assigned species of Eryosuchus, were sometimes placed in the expansive genera Parotosaurus/Parotosuchus, which underscores the complexities of capitosaur taxonomy and the role of biogeography in formalizing such taxonomy. In the most restrictive concept of Eryosuchus (that of Schoch & Milner, 2000, and most other authors), Eryosuchus is exclusively a Russian taxon. Morales (1988) mentioned a possible new species of Eryosuchus that would represent the largest known, with an uncatalogued skull exceeding 1 m in length that would be one of the largest known temnospondyls; Schoch & Milner (2000) reiterated this and suggested that a description by Morales was forthcoming, but this specimen has never been described and could represent a different genus. If this specimen is not considered, the largest known specimen of Eryosuchus is only slightly more than 50 cm.

== Anatomy ==
Competing concepts of Eryosuchus produce different summaries of diagnostic features. Schoch & Milner's concept, that of an exclusively Russian clade and that is adopted by most other workers, listed only two synapomorphies of the genus: intermediately sized orbits (larger than most capitosauroids other than mastodonsaurids) and an elongate post-glenoid area (PGA) that is shallowly concave and with a medial ridge aligned sagittally. Damiani's (2001) more expansive concept listed only laterally directed tabular horns with an antero-distal 'lappet' as apomorphic for this genus. Eryosuchus tverdochlebovi and E. garjainovi are represented by many skulls and postcranial remains, which secures their validity in contrast to E. antiquus, represented by one lower jaw fragment. The two definitive species are differentiated by their relative orbit size and the length of their basicranial suture. This is one of the few capitosaurs from which fully ossified intercentra are known.

== Phylogeny ==
Below is the phylogeny from Fortuny et al. (2011); E. garjainovi is typically used as the representative of this genus:

- - Lydekkerina huxleyi
  - Rhinesuchidae
    - Rhineceps nyasaensis
    - Uranocentrodon senekalensis
  - - Capitosauria
      - Wetlugasaurus angustifrons
      - - - Odenwaldia heidelbergensis
          - Vladlenosaurus alexeyevi
        - - - - Edingerella madagascariensis
              - Watsonisuchus spp.
            - - Xenotosuchus africanus
              - - Cherninia denwai
                - - Paracyclotosaurus crookshanki
                  - - - Stanocephalosaurus pronus
                      - Stanocephalosaurus birdi
                    - - Procyclotosaurus stantonensis
                      - - Eocyclotosaurus spp.
                        - Quasicyclotosaurus campi
          - - Parotosuchus orenburgensis
            - - Calmasuchus acri
              - - - Cyclotosaurus robustus
                  - Tatrasuchus wildi
                - - Eryosuchus garjainovi
                  - Mastodonsaurus giganteus
    - Trematosauria
      - Benthosuchus sushkini
      - Trematosauroidea
        - Thoosuchus yakovlevi
        - - Angusaurus spp.
          - Trematosaurus brauni

== Biostratigraphy ==
The Russian framework for Triassic biostratigraphy is larged based on temnospondyls, in contrast to the South African Assemblage Zones, which are largely based on amniotes. Eryosuchus is among the taxa used to make regional correlations given its relatively common occurrence in Russia. It is thought that the Eryosuchus Fauna is at least partially correlative with the Cynognathus Assemblage Zone in South Africa.
