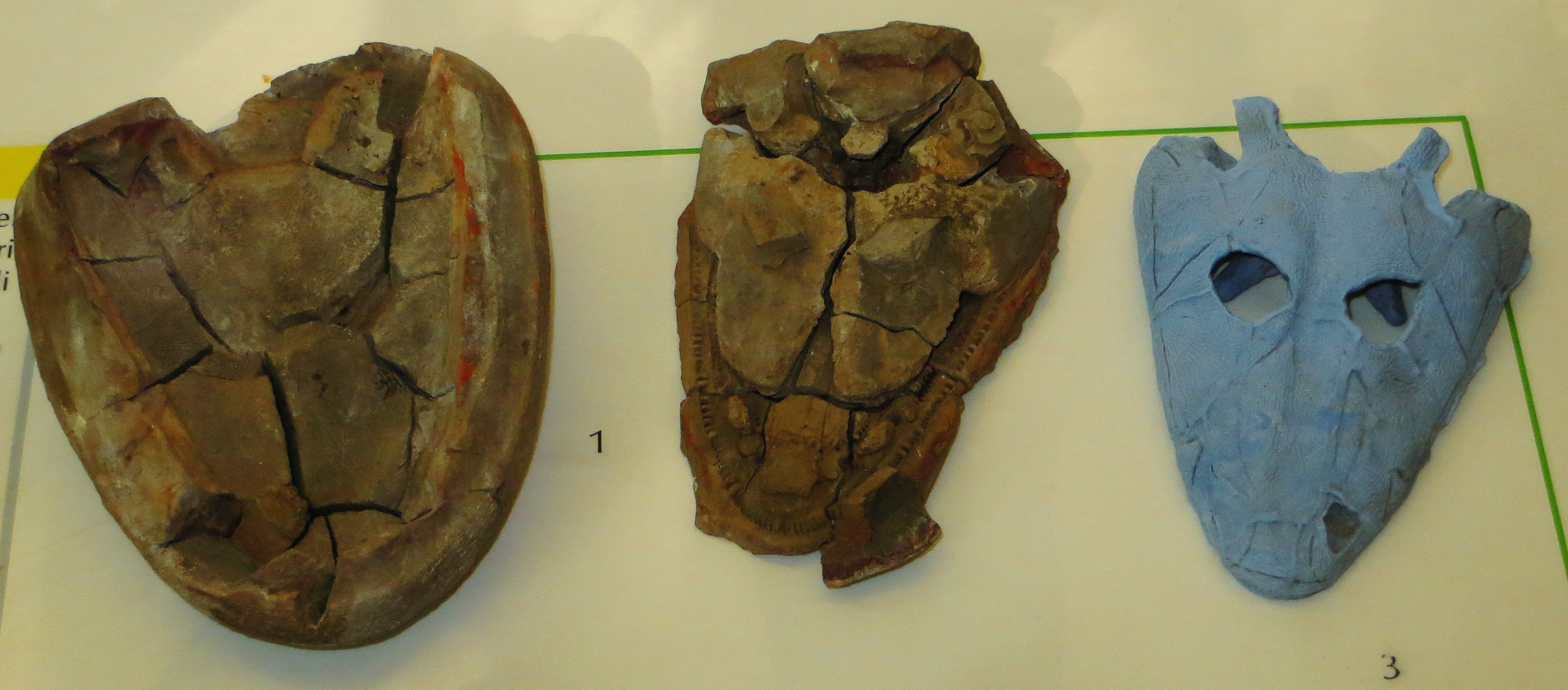
- Skulls

Scientific classification
- Kingdom: Animalia
- Phylum: Chordata
- Clade: Tetrapoda
- Order: †Temnospondyli
- Suborder: †Stereospondyli
- Clade: †Capitosauria
- Genus: †Edingerella; Schoch and Milner, 2000

Type species
- †Edingerella madagascariensis (Lehman, 1961 [originally Benthosuchus madagascariensis])

= Edingerella =

Edingerella Temporal range: Early Triassic

Extinct genus of temnospondyls

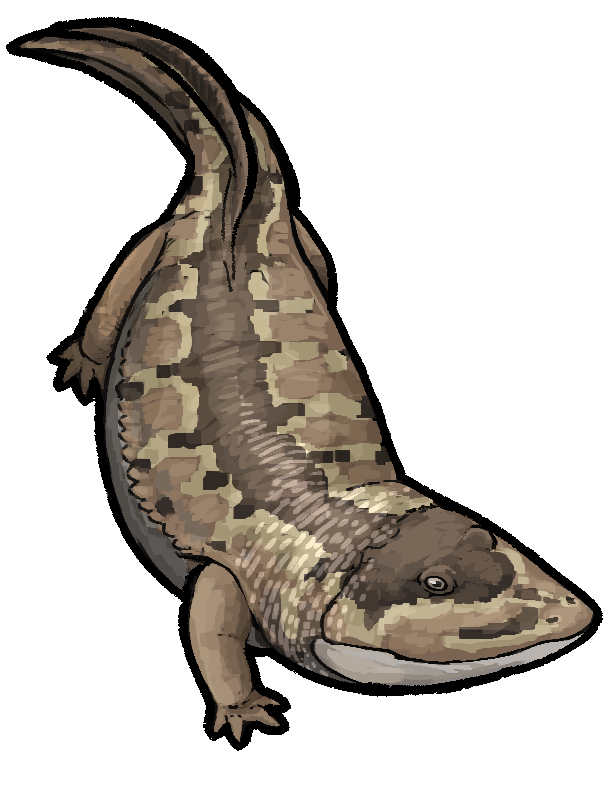
Restoration

Edingerella is an extinct genus of temnospondyl amphibian from the Early Triassic of Madagascar. It is a basal capitosaur closely related to Watsonisuchus.

== Phylogeny ==
Below is a cladogram from Fortuny et al. (2011):

- Stereospondyli
  - Lydekkerina huxleyi
  - Rhinesuchidae
    - Rhineceps nyasaensis
    - Uranocentrodon senekalensis
  - - Capitosauria
      - Wetlugasaurus angustifrons
      - - - Odenwaldia heidelbergensis
          - Vladlenosaurus alexeyevi
        - - - - Edingerella madagascariensis
              - Watsonisuchus
            - - Xenotosuchus africanus
              - - Cherninia denwai
                - - Paracyclotosaurus crookshanki
                  - - - Stanocephalosaurus pronus
                      - Stanocephalosaurus birdi
                    - - Procyclotosaurus stantonensis
                      - - Eocyclotosaurus spp.
                        - Quasicyclotosaurus campi
          - - Parotosuchus orenburgensis
            - - Calmasuchus acri
              - - - Cyclotosaurus robustus
                  - Tatrasuchus wildi
                - - Eryosuchus garjainovi
                  - Mastodonsaurus giganteus
    - Trematosauria
      - Benthosuchus sushkini
      - Trematosauroidea
        - Thoosuchus yakovlevi
        - - Angusaurus spp.
          - Trematosaurus brauni
