= Xenotosuchus =

Xenotosuchus Temporal range: Middle Triassic
- Xenotosuchus skull, showing the full complement of tetrapod skull roof bones

Scientific classification
- Kingdom: Animalia
- Phylum: Chordata
- Clade: Tetrapoda
- Order: †Temnospondyli
- Suborder: †Stereospondyli
- Clade: †Capitosauria
- Superfamily: †Mastodonsauroidea
- Genus: †Xenotosuchus; Morales and Shishkin, 2002

Species
- †X. africanus Morales and Shishkin, 2002 (type)

Synonyms
- Parotosuchus africanus (Broom, 1909)

Extinct genus of temnospondyls

Xenotosuchus is an extinct genus of capitosaur temnospondyl from the Middle Triassic of South Africa. The type and only species is Xenotosuchus africanus.

== History of study ==
The taxon was originally named as "Capitosaurus africanus" by Broom (1909) for the lectotype, a partial skull and hemimandible from Farm Vaalbank in Eastern Cape, with description of additional material from Farm Winaarsbaaken in Eastern Cape by Haughton (1925). All material comes from the Cynognathus Assemblage Zone, specifically the Trirachodon-Kannemeyeria Subzone ("subzone B") in the Karoo Basin. Some workers considered Broom's original description to be insufficient for the purposes of formally erecting a new species (thus making it a nomen vanum).

Chernin (1978) redescribed and figured the lectotype in detail as "Parotosuchus africanus". Although Chernin is sometimes credited with reassigning the species to Parotosuchus, Watson (1962) was the first to refer to it as such (then as 'Parotosaurus').

Schoch & Milner (2000) considered the species valid but of uncertain genus placement. Damiani (2001) placed the species in Wellesaurus before Morales and Shishkin (2002) described a previously undescribed and nearly complete skull from Farm Matabele in Free State that they referred to the species and created the new genus Xenotosuchus for the species.

Damiani (2008) described another previously undescribed and relatively complete skull, the largest known for the species, from Farm Cuylerville in Eastern Cape. Damiani also listed, but did not describe, two other previously unreferred specimens representing partial skulls.

== Description ==
The skull of X. africanus is much longer than it is broad and with the orbits in the posterior third of the skull in the largest specimen. The otic notch is semi-closed, with tabular horns directed mainly laterally. Morales & Shishkin (2004) diagnosed X. africanus by four features: (1) gently curved (rather than zigzag) lacrimal flexure of the infraorbital sensory groove; (2) maximum width of the frontals is in the preorbital region and without lateral interorbital projections; (3) relatively wide nasals; (4) absence of a median occipital projection on the postparietals dorsal to the foramen magnum. However, they noted that the first and second features might be subject to individual (intraspecific) variation, and Damiani (2008) considered all four to be unreliable on that basis. Damiani instead identified a single autapomorphy, midline contact of the exoccipitals posterior to the parasphenoid.

== Phylogenetic relationships ==
The position of Xenotosuchus within Capitosauria is somewhat variable in phylogenetic analyses based on the taxon sample, but it generally forms a single branch near the base of the clade.

Below is a cladogram from Fortuny et al. (2011):

- Stereospondyli
  - Lydekkerina huxleyi
  - Rhinesuchidae
    - Rhineceps nyasaensis
    - Uranocentrodon senekalensis
  - - Capitosauria
      - Wetlugasaurus angustifrons
      - - - Odenwaldia heidelbergensis
          - Vladlenosaurus alexeyevi
        - - - - Edingerella madagascariensis
              - Watsonisuchus
            - - Xenotosuchus africanus
              - - Cherninia denwai
                - - Paracyclotosaurus crookshanki
                  - - - Stanocephalosaurus pronus
                      - Stanocephalosaurus birdi
                    - - Procyclotosaurus stantonensis
                      - - Eocyclotosaurus spp.
                        - Quasicyclotosaurus campi
          - - Parotosuchus orenburgensis
            - - Calmasuchus acri
              - - - Cyclotosaurus robustus
                  - Tatrasuchus wildi
                - - Eryosuchus garjainovi
                  - Mastodonsaurus giganteus
    - Trematosauria
      - Benthosuchus sushkini
      - Trematosauroidea
        - Thoosuchus yakovlevi
        - - Angusaurus spp.
          - Trematosaurus brauni

== See also ==
- Prehistoric amphibian
- List of prehistoric amphibians
