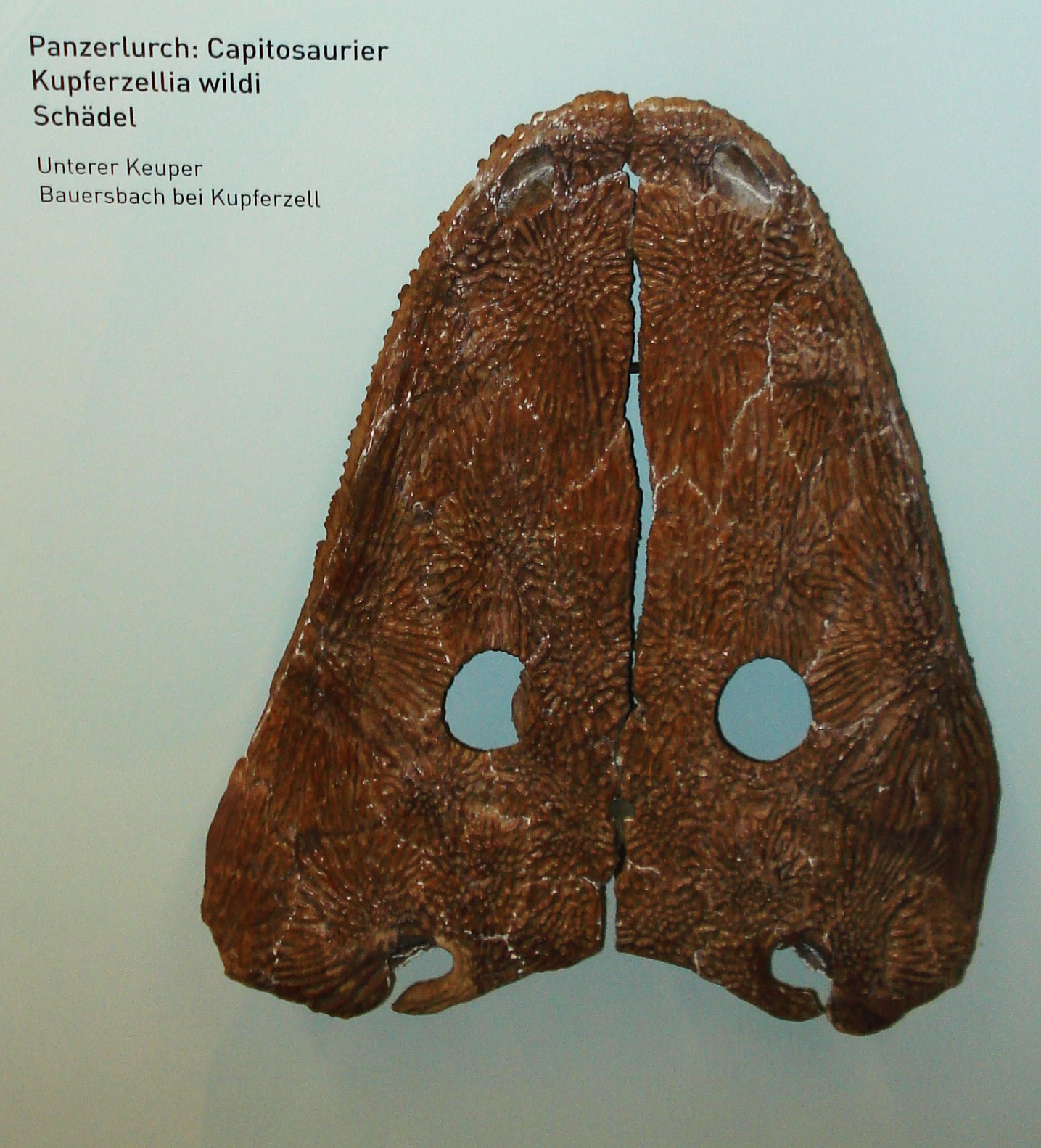

Scientific classification
- Kingdom: Animalia
- Phylum: Chordata
- Clade: Tetrapoda
- Order: †Temnospondyli
- Suborder: †Stereospondyli
- Clade: †Capitosauria
- Family: †Mastodonsauridae
- Genus: †Tatrasuchus; Maryańska and Shishkin, 1996

Type species
- †Tatrasuchus kulczyckii Maryańska and Shishkin, 1996

= Tatrasuchus =

Tatrasuchus Temporal range: Middle Triassic, ~246.7–237 Ma

Extinct genus of temnospondyls

Tatrasuchus is an extinct genus of temnospondyl from the Middle Triassic of Poland and Germany. It is classified as a member of the family Cyclotosauridae or Mastodonsauridae. It is closely related to the genus Cyclotosaurus. The type species, Tatrasuchus kulczyckii, was named in 1996. Damiani (2001) considered genus Kupferzellia Schoch (1997) from the Middle Triassic of Germany to be a junior synonym of Tatrasuchus, and recombined its type species, K. wildi as the second species of Tatrasuchus. This classification was followed by some authors, e.g. Fortuny et al. (2011); other authors, e.g. Schoch (2008), maintain Tatrasuchus and Kupferzellia as distinct genera. However, Schoch & Moreno (2024) synonymized the two genera, maintaining T. wildi as a distinct species from T. kulczyckii.

== Phylogeny ==
Below is a cladogram from Fortuny et al. (2011):

- Stereospondyli
  - Lydekkerina huxleyi
  - Rhinesuchidae
    - Rhineceps nyasaensis
    - Uranocentrodon senekalensis
  - - Capitosauria
      - Wetlugasaurus angustifrons
      - - - Odenwaldia heidelbergensis
          - Vladlenosaurus alexeyevi
        - - - - Edingerella madagascariensis
              - Watsonisuchus spp.
            - - Xenotosuchus africanus
              - - Cherninia denwai
                - - Paracyclotosaurus crookshanki
                  - - - Stanocephalosaurus pronus
                      - Stanocephalosaurus birdi
                    - - Procyclotosaurus stantonensis
                      - - Eocyclotosaurus spp.
                        - Quasicyclotosaurus campi
          - - Parotosuchus orenburgensis
            - - Calmasuchus acri
              - - - Cyclotosaurus robustus
                  - Tatrasuchus wildi
                - - Eryosuchus garjainovi
                  - Mastodonsaurus giganteus
    - Trematosauria
      - Benthosuchus sushkini
      - Trematosauroidea
        - Thoosuchus yakovlevi
        - - Angusaurus spp.
          - Trematosaurus brauni
