= Vladlenosaurus =

Vladlenosaurus Temporal range: Early Triassic

Scientific classification
- Kingdom: Animalia
- Phylum: Chordata
- Clade: Tetrapoda
- Order: †Temnospondyli
- Suborder: †Stereospondyli
- Clade: †Capitosauria
- Genus: †Vladlenosaurus; Morkovin and Novikov, 2000

Type species
- †V. alexeyevi Morkovin and Novikov, 2000

Extinct genus of temnospondyls

Vladlenosaurus is an extinct genus of capitosaurian temnospondyl from Russia. It lived during the late Vetlugian (Early Triassic). Based on the type of deposits it was found in, Vladlenosaurus probably inhabited lacustrine, or lake, habitats. The type species is V. alexeyevi, named in 2000.

== Description ==
Unlike the flatter, more rounded snouts of other capitosaurs, Vladlenosaurus had a wedge-shaped snout. This characteristic is also seen in trematosaurians, although it was independently acquired in both cases as a result of convergent evolution.

== Classification ==
Vladlenosaurus is similar in appearance to the benthosuchids, a group of trematosauroid temnospondyls, but is more closely related to mastodonsauroids. Among capitosaurs, it shares many features with the basal form Wetlugasaurus, also from the Early Triassic of Russia. Vladlenosaurus alexeyevi was even considered to be a species of Wetlugasaurus in a 2006 study. In a 2011 phylogenetic analysis, the first to incorporate Vladlenosaurus, the genus was found to be most closely related to Odenwaldia. It and Odenwaldia formed a basal clade of capitosaurs more derived than Wetlugasaurus, the most basal capitosaur. Below is a modified cladogram from Fortuny et al (in press) showing the relationship of Vladlenosaurus to other stereospondyls:

- Stereospondyli
  - Lydekkerina
  - Rhinesuchidae
  - - Capitosauria
      - Wetlugasaurus
      - - - Odenwaldia
          - Vladlenosaurus
        - - - - Edingerella
              - Watsonisuchus
            - - Xenotosuchus
              - - Cherninia
                - - Paracyclotosaurus
                  - - Stenotosauridae
                    - Heylerosauridae
          - Mastodonsauridae
    - Trematosauria
