= Wellesaurus =

Wellesaurus Temporal range: Triassic, 251.3–247.2 Ma

Scientific classification
- Domain: Eukaryota
- Kingdom: Animalia
- Phylum: Chordata
- Order: †Temnospondyli
- Suborder: †Stereospondyli
- Clade: †Capitosauria
- Family: †Stenotosauridae
- Genus: †Wellesaurus; Lehman, 1971

Species
- †W. peabodyi (Welles and Cosgriff, 1965) (type)

Extinct genus of temnospondyls

Wellesaurus is an extinct genus of mastodonsauroid temnospondyl. They were amphibious carnivores that lived in freshwater environments.

Wellesaurus encompasses several species which were connected when the genus was named in 1971. The type species, Wellesaurus peabodyi, was originally named as Parotosaurus peabodyi in 1965. This species is based on UCMP 36058, a complete skull from the Wupatki Member of the Moenkopi Formation in Arizona. Many other skulls have been recovered from the area and referred to the species. Wellesaurus peabodyi is often considered synonymous with Stanocephalosaurus birdi, a contemporaneous capitosaur named in 1933.

Another potential species, Wellesaurus africanus, is from subzone B of the Cynognathus Assemblage Zone in South Africa. Although this species was originally formulated in 1909, the fragmentary preservation of its material has prevented precise conclusions on its affinities. As a result, it has been referred to a variety of mastodonsauroid genera, including Capitosaurus, Parotosuchus, and Wellesaurus. Based on a more complete skull, the africanus species was given its own genus, Xenotosuchus, in 2002.

A third potential species, Wellesaurus bussoni, was named in 1971 based on fragmentary skull material from the Lower Sandstone Member of the Zarzaïtine Series in Algeria. This species is considered indeterminate and dubious, possibly representing remains of a juvenile heylerosaurid. It has also been connected with "Parotosuchus lapperenti", another obscure and indeterminate Algerian mastodonsauroid.

== See also ==
- Prehistoric amphibian
- List of prehistoric amphibians
