= Yuan'an County =

Yuan'an County 远安县 Yuanan
- County
- Location in Hubei
- Coordinates (Yuan'an government): 31°03′39″N 111°38′26″E
- Country: People's Republic of China
- Province: Hubei
- Prefecture-level city: Yichang

Area
  - Total: 1,752 km^{2} (676 sq mi)

Population (2020)
  - Total: 166,174
  - Density: 94.85/km^{2} (245.7/sq mi)
- Time zone: UTC+8 (China Standard)
- Website: www.yuanan.gov.cn

Yuan'an County (simplified Chinese: 远安县; traditional Chinese: 遠安縣; pinyin: Yuǎn'ān Xiàn) is a county in the west of Hubei province, People's Republic of China. It is under the administration of the prefecture-level city of Yichang.

Yuanansuchus, an extinct mastodonsauroid temnospondyl, is named after Yuan'an County where its remains were first discovered.

== Administrative divisions ==
Six towns:

- Mingfeng (鸣凤镇), Hualinsi (花林寺镇), Jiuxian (旧县镇), Yangping (洋坪镇), Maopingchang (茅坪场镇), Hehua (荷花镇)

The only township is Hekou Township (河口乡)

== Climate ==
Climate data for Yuan'an, elevation 142 m (466 ft), (1991–2020 normals, extremes 1991–present)
| Month | Jan | Feb | Mar | Apr | May | Jun | Jul | Aug | Sep | Oct | Nov | Dec | Year |
|---|---|---|---|---|---|---|---|---|---|---|---|---|---|
| Record high °C (°F) | 23.0 (73.4) | 26.7 (80.1) | 32.6 (90.7) | 36.3 (97.3) | 38.3 (100.9) | 39.1 (102.4) | 40.1 (104.2) | 41.6 (106.9) | 42.6 (108.7) | 35.4 (95.7) | 29.5 (85.1) | 24.8 (76.6) | 42.6 (108.7) |
| Mean daily maximum °C (°F) | 8.9 (48.0) | 11.7 (53.1) | 17.9 (64.2) | 23.4 (74.1) | 27.2 (81.0) | 30.1 (86.2) | 32.8 (91.0) | 33.3 (91.9) | 28.1 (82.6) | 22.9 (73.2) | 16.9 (62.4) | 11.5 (52.7) | 22.1 (71.7) |
| Daily mean °C (°F) | 4.0 (39.2) | 6.2 (43.2) | 11.6 (52.9) | 16.9 (62.4) | 21.3 (70.3) | 24.9 (76.8) | 27.5 (81.5) | 27.4 (81.3) | 22.7 (72.9) | 17.2 (63.0) | 11.7 (53.1) | 5.9 (42.6) | 16.4 (61.6) |
| Mean daily minimum °C (°F) | 0.6 (33.1) | 2.3 (36.1) | 7.0 (44.6) | 11.9 (53.4) | 16.8 (62.2) | 21.0 (69.8) | 23.8 (74.8) | 23.4 (74.1) | 19.2 (66.6) | 13.5 (56.3) | 8.2 (46.8) | 2.1 (35.8) | 12.5 (54.5) |
| Record low °C (°F) | −9.3 (15.3) | −6.2 (20.8) | −2.3 (27.9) | 1.7 (35.1) | 8.2 (46.8) | 13.9 (57.0) | 16.5 (61.7) | 16.2 (61.2) | 10.2 (50.4) | 2.7 (36.9) | −2.8 (27.0) | −8.6 (16.5) | −9.3 (15.3) |
| Average precipitation mm (inches) | 21.3 (0.84) | 30.8 (1.21) | 47.0 (1.85) | 93.2 (3.67) | 129.2 (5.09) | 158.4 (6.24) | 216.2 (8.51) | 173.9 (6.85) | 84.4 (3.32) | 73.5 (2.89) | 42.2 (1.66) | 14.2 (0.56) | 1,084.3 (42.69) |
| Average precipitation days (≥ 0.1 mm) | 7.0 | 8.1 | 10.4 | 11.7 | 13.4 | 12.7 | 14.5 | 12.9 | 10.0 | 10.3 | 8.7 | 6.3 | 126 |
| Average snowy days | 3.7 | 2.7 | 1.0 | 0 | 0 | 0 | 0 | 0 | 0 | 0 | 0.2 | 1.4 | 9 |
| Average relative humidity (%) | 73 | 72 | 72 | 74 | 75 | 79 | 81 | 79 | 77 | 78 | 78 | 74 | 76 |
| Mean monthly sunshine hours | 96.4 | 96.9 | 129.2 | 152.3 | 162.4 | 156.6 | 190.1 | 198.9 | 148.5 | 142.6 | 126.5 | 109.1 | 1,709.5 |
| Percentage possible sunshine | 30 | 31 | 35 | 39 | 38 | 37 | 44 | 49 | 40 | 41 | 40 | 35 | 38 |
Source: China Meteorological Administrationall-time extreme temperature
