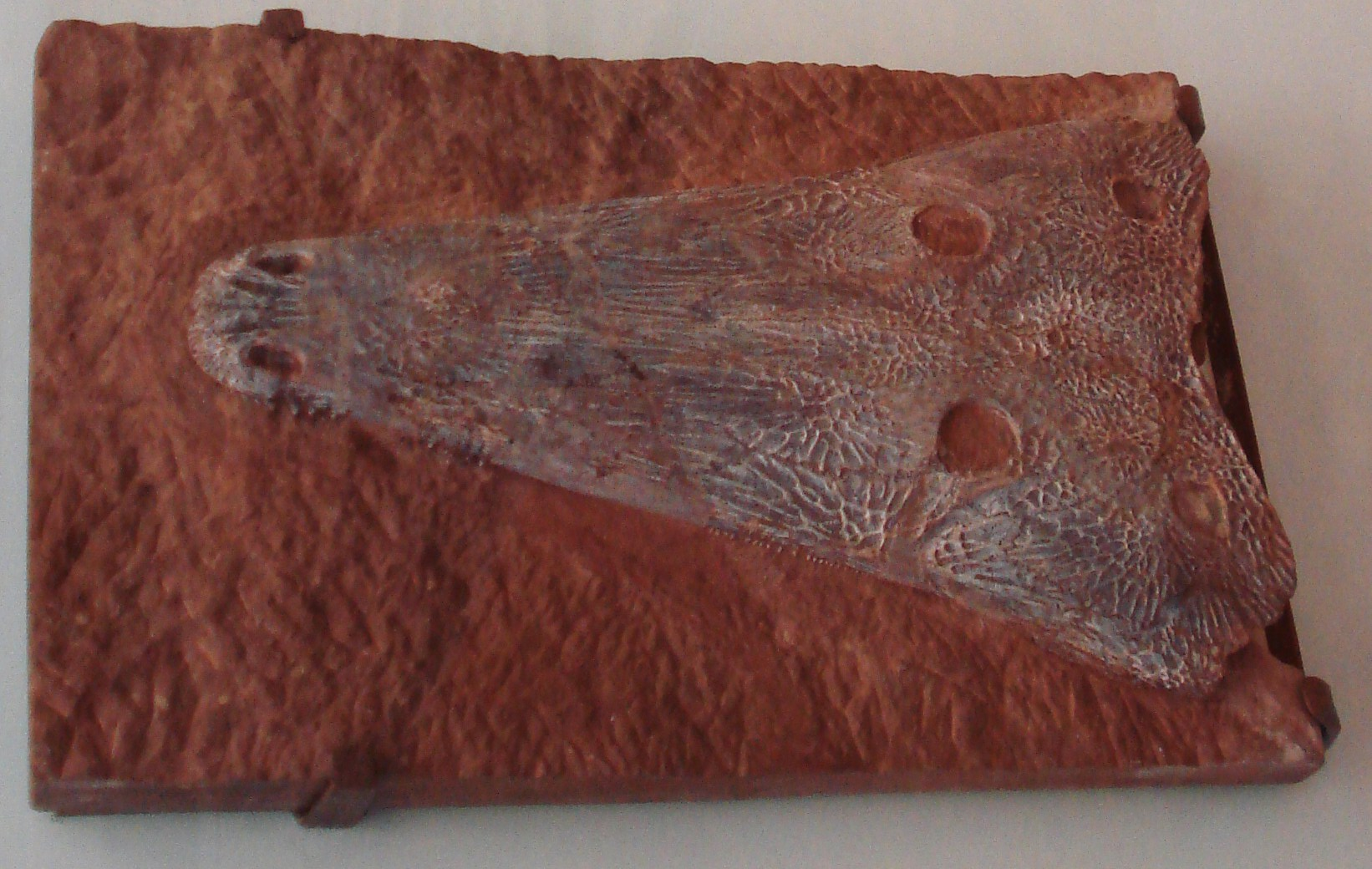
- E. voschmidti skull

Scientific classification
- Kingdom: Animalia
- Phylum: Chordata
- Clade: Tetrapoda
- Order: †Temnospondyli
- Suborder: †Stereospondyli
- Clade: †Capitosauria
- Family: †Heylerosauridae
- Genus: †Eocyclotosaurus; Ortlam, 1970

Type species
- †E. woschmidti Ortlam, 1970

Other species
- †E. lehmani Kamphausen and Morales, 1981; †E. wellesi Schoch, 2000; †E. appetolatus Rinehart, Lucas, and Schoch, 2015

= Eocyclotosaurus =

Eocyclotosaurus Temporal range: Middle Triassic 247.2–242.0 Ma

Extinct genus of temnospondyls

Eocyclotosaurus (Greek 'èoos' = dawn, 'kyklos' = circle, 'ous' = ear ) is an extinct genus of mastodonsauroid temnospondyl from the Middle Triassic (Anisian). The name Eocyclotosaurus means "dawn round-eared lizard". It is characterized as a capitosauroid with a long and slender snout, closed otic fenestra, and small orbits. It measured over one metre and had a 22 cm skull.

It lived between 247 and 242 million years ago in both North America, Germany, France and the British Isles during the early Triassic.

== Discovery and naming ==
The genus Eocyclotosaurus was named by Dieter Ortlam in 1970. The type species is Eocyclotosaurus woschmidti, the specific name honouring Wolfgang Schmidt.

== Description ==
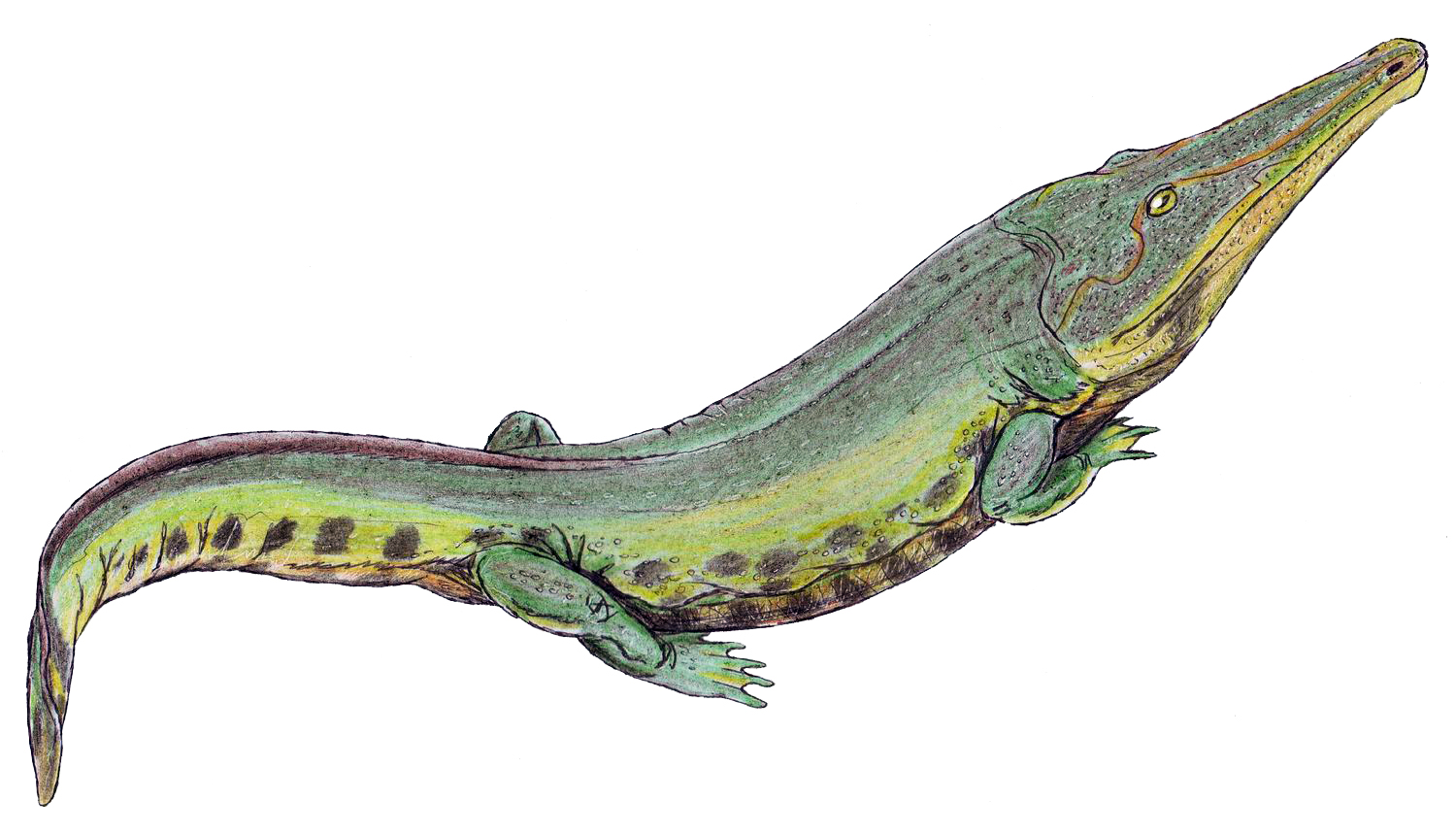
Life restoration of E. wellesi

Compered to Cyclotosaurus, Eocyclotosaurus has a similar morphology in postorbital division of the skull. However, in Eocyclotosaurus the depth of the occiput is greater.

=== Skull ===
The species is narrow-headed. Orbits were smaller in Eocyclotosaurus and related forms compared to other taxa such as Mastodonsaurus who had up to three times the size of smaller eyed taxa. Posteromedial expansion is absent in Eocyclotosaurus, due to anterior snout region being narrower. Premaxillary teeth are transversely elongated. The jaw is heavily reticulated and has a ridge and groove ornamentation of the angular.

=== Distinguishing features ===
The tabular horn is situated on the side and toward the back of the body / laterally directed and suturing with the squamosal posteriorly. The parasphenoid cultriform process is expanded at the base and constricted at midlength. The upper jaw condyle does not join with the quadratojugal. The vomerine plate lies anterior to the interpterygoid vacuities and is elongate. The parasphenoid cultriform process is deep and thin ventrally. The parasphenoid cultriform process is underplated by posterior extension of the vomer.

== Phylogeny ==
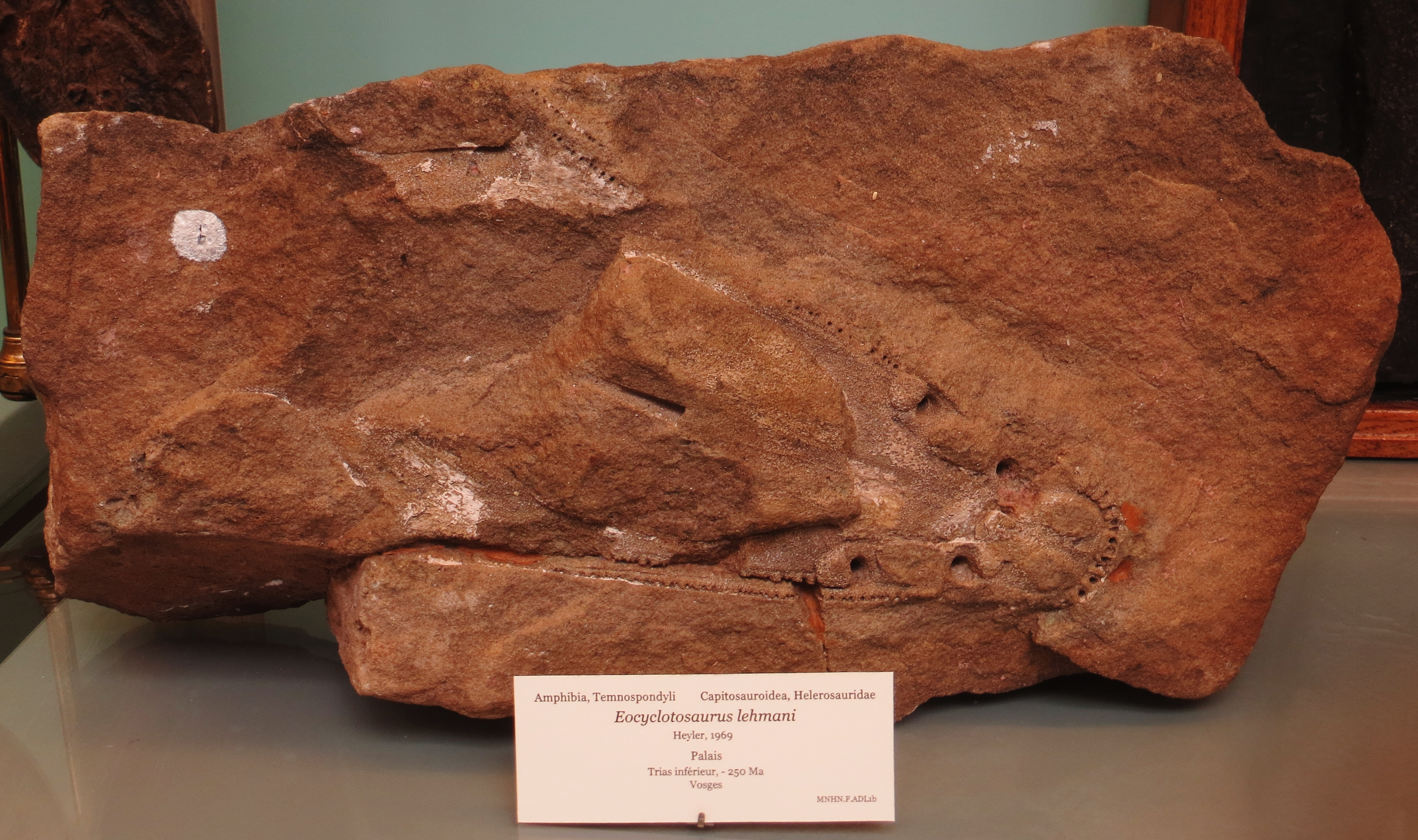
E. lehmani skull

The phylogenetic position of the genus Eocyclotosaurus within the capitosaur taxa according to Witzmann et al. (2016)

- - Eryosuchus
  - - Kupferzellia
    - - Procyclotosaurus
      - - Paracyclotosaurus
        - - Mastodonsaurus
            - Mastodonsaurus cappelensis
            - Mastodonsaurus giganteus
          - - Cyclotosaurus
            - - Quasicyclotosaurus
              - Eocyclotosaurus

== Paleobiology ==
The skull of Eocyclotosaurus was more suited for capturing small prey compared to Cyclotosaurus who was tested to have more capabilities to hunt larger prey. Feeding mechanism and diet: It has been analyzed to capture small prey using a side striking behavior. General scenarios for eating heavier for temnospondyls are inferred based on their atomical evidence. Prey would be captured in their teeth, manipulated into swallowing position by their tongue, and swallowed with the assistance of their tongue. The reduction of the cross section of its skull and the elongation of its nasal bones was an adaptation to reduce drag during lateral movement of the head, increasing the efficiency of aquatic feeding.

== Paleoecology ==
Its habitat was aquatic. Discovered in the 1980s, Northeastern New Mexico has the most abundant bonebed of Eocyclotosaurus.

By the early Anison, most major crown clades were present: heylerosaurids (Eocyclotosaurus), mastodonsaurids, stenotosaurids. The origin of the genus Eocyclotosaurus was at the Spanthaian and Anisian boundary, separate from Cyclotosaurus in the late Ladiunian. Separate evolution suggest separate stratigraphy.
