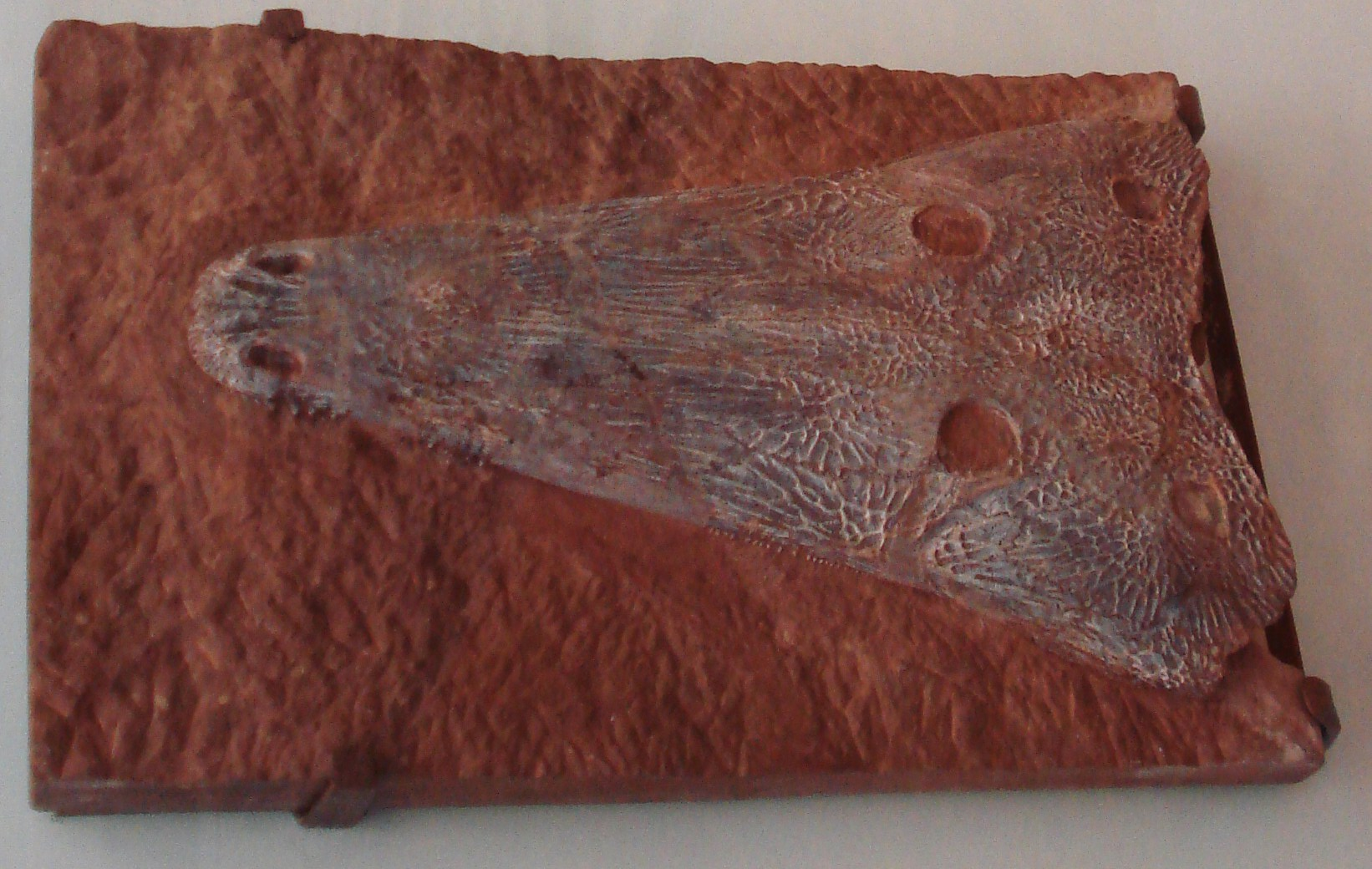
- Skull of Eocyclotosaurus woschmidti

Scientific classification
- Kingdom: Animalia
- Phylum: Chordata
- Clade: Tetrapoda
- Order: †Temnospondyli
- Suborder: †Stereospondyli
- Clade: †Capitosauria
- Superfamily: †Mastodonsauroidea
- Family: †Heylerosauridae; Shishkin, 1980

= Heylerosauridae =

Heylerosaurids Temporal range: Middle Triassic–Late Triassic

Extinct family of temnospondyls

Heylerosauridae is a family of mastodonsauroid temnospondyls. It was first named in 1980 to include the genera Odenwaldia and Quasicyclotosaurus. In addition to these genera, the family now includes Eocyclotosaurus and Yuanansuchus. Recent phylogenetic analyses have not found a close relationship between Odenwaldia and other heylerosaurids and place it outside the family. Heylerosaurids are generally regarded as the sister taxon of the stenotosaurids.
