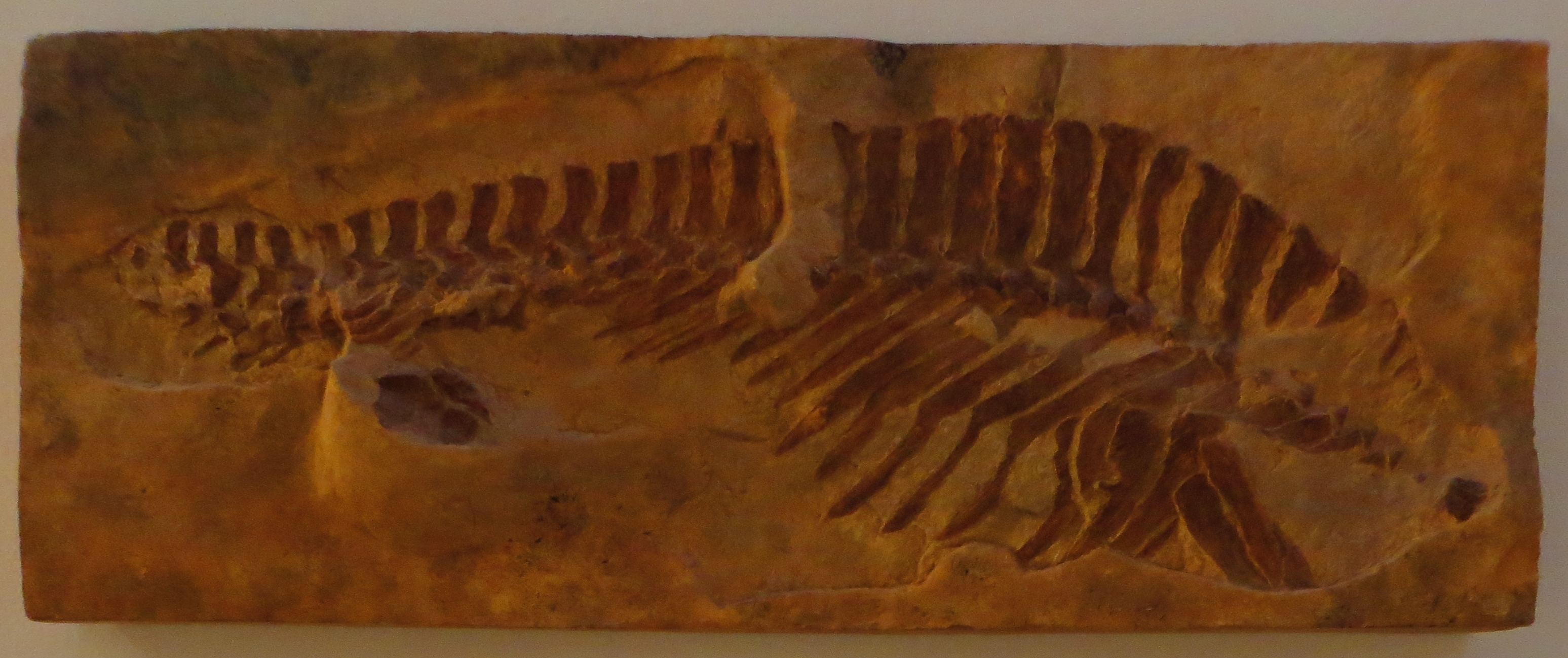
- Fossil

Scientific classification
- Kingdom: Animalia
- Phylum: Chordata
- Clade: Tetrapoda
- Order: †Temnospondyli
- Suborder: †Stereospondyli
- Clade: †Capitosauria
- Family: †Sclerothoracidae; Huene, 1932
- Genus: †Sclerothorax; Huene, 1932

Type species
- †Sclerothorax hypselonotus Huene, 1932

= Sclerothorax =

Sclerothorax Temporal range: Early Triassic, Olenekian

Extinct genus of temnospondyls

Sclerothorax is an extinct genus of temnospondyl from the Early Triassic of Germany. It is distinguished from other temnospondyls by its short and very wide skull and the elongated neural spines that form a ridge along its back. Sclerothorax is a basal member of Capitosauria, a large clade of temnospondyls that lived throughout the Triassic.

== Description ==
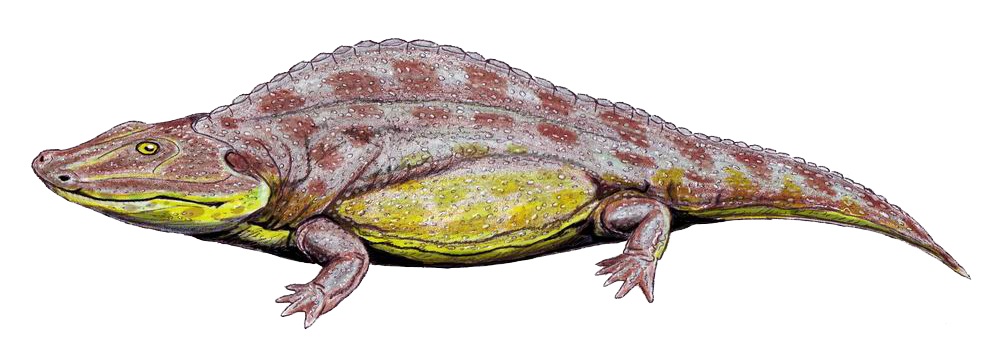
Restoration

Among the most unusual features of Sclerothorax are its elongated neural spines. The neural spines are tallest at the front of the spine. Sclerothorax also has a very large pectoral girdle; the interclavicle bone is longer than the skull, meaning that Sclerothorax has the proportionally largest interclavicle of any temnospondyl. The body of Sclerothorax is covered by small scale-like bony ossicles that would have been embedded in the dermis in life. The skull of Sclerothorax is short, wide, and roughly rectangular in shape. The snout is wider than the cheek region. The bones along the midline of the skull roof are also very wide relative to those of other temnospondyls.

== Discovery ==
Two fossil specimens of Sclerothorax were discovered in the German state of Hesse in the 1920s. German paleontologist Friedrich von Huene studied the remains and named the new genus and species Sclerothorax hypselonotus in 1932. The holotype specimen preserved only the vertebral column, but was identifiable as a temnospondyl by its rhachitomous vertebrae and as a new species by its tall neural spines. Huene's second specimen included a complete skull, pectoral girdle, and back portion of the dorsal vertebral column that was also clearly a temnospondyl. However, it was not apparent that the specimen belonged to the same species as the first until Huene exposed more of the crushed vertebrae and found that they were similar to those of his first specimen.

A third specimen of Sclerothorax was discovered in 1967 that preserved the vertebral column and the lower jaw. It was described in 2004 by Michael Fastnacht, who also reported that the specimen had an impression of the palate. The palate seemed to be long and narrow like that of another German temnospondyl called Trematosaurus. Fastnacht therefore concluded that Huene's two specimens belonged to different species, with the first high-spined specimen referable to Sclerothorax. However, three more specimens were uncovered in German museum collections with nearly complete skulls attached to vertebral columns. These specimens had broad heads, proving that Huene's second specimen also belongs to Sclerothorax.

== Classification ==
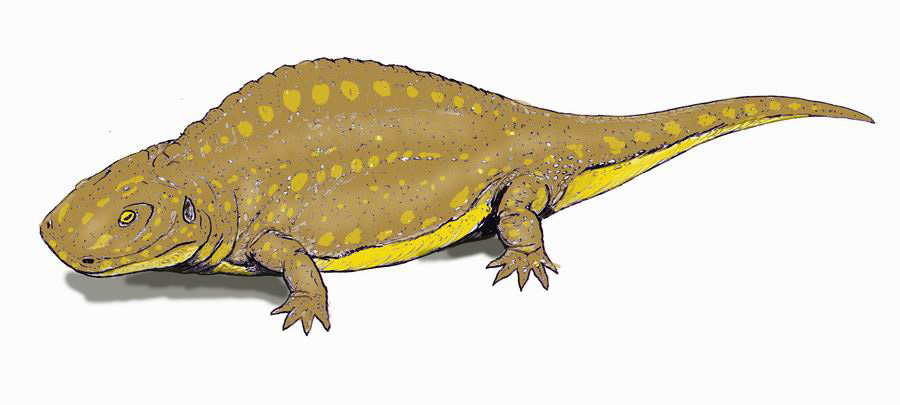
Restoration

Huene originally classified Sclerothorax within the family Actinodontidae as a close relative of Sclerocephalus, another genus of temnospondyl from Germany that has a similarly broad skull. This classification put it as a close relative of a major temnospondyl group called Stereospondyli, characterized by centra (central portions of vertebrae) that are primarily formed by bones called intercentra (non-stereospondyl temnospondyls have an additional bone called the pleurocentrum that forms a significant portion of each vertebra). The unusual vertebrae of Sclerothorax were thought to separate it from stereospondyls, but in 2000 it was reinterpreted as a tentative member of the group. A phylogenetic analysis published in 2007 placed Sclerothorax as a derived stereospondyl in a clade called Capitosauria.
