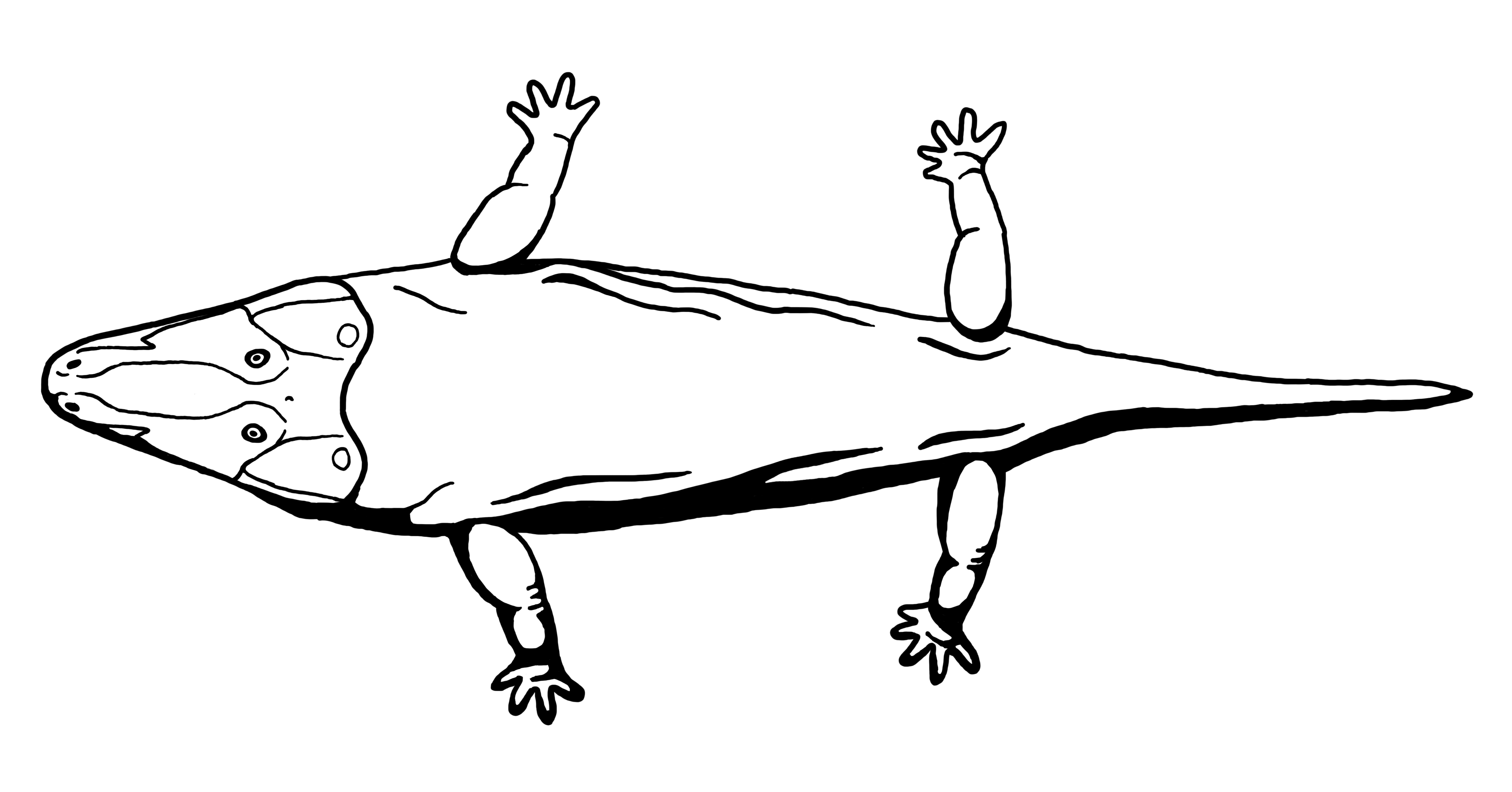
- Stenotosaurus stantonensis

Scientific classification
- Kingdom: Animalia
- Phylum: Chordata
- Clade: Tetrapoda
- Order: †Temnospondyli
- Suborder: †Stereospondyli
- Clade: †Capitosauria
- Superfamily: †Mastodonsauroidea
- Family: †Stenotosauridae; Heyler, 1969

Genera
- †Procyclotosaurus; †Stenotosaurus; †Wellesaurus

= Stenotosauridae =

Stenotosauridae Temporal range: Triassic

Extinct family of temnospondyls

Stenotosauridae is an extinct family of mastodonsauroid temnospondyls. It has included genera such as Stenotosaurus, Wellesaurus, and Procyclotosaurus.
