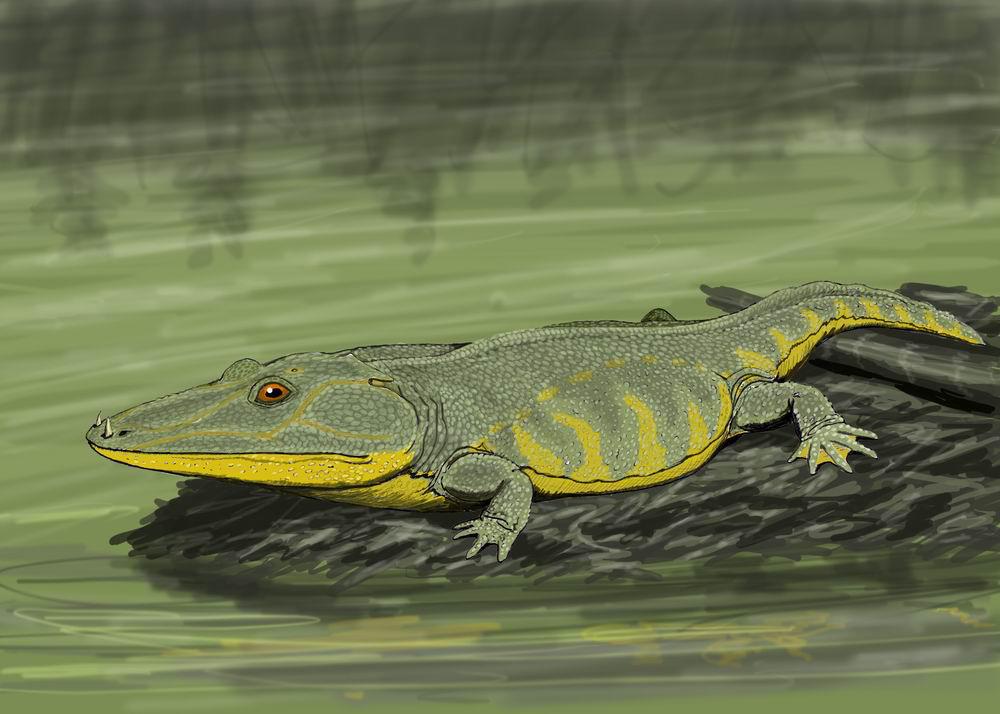
- Mastodonsaurus

Scientific classification
- Kingdom: Animalia
- Phylum: Chordata
- Clade: Tetrapoda
- Order: †Temnospondyli
- Suborder: †Stereospondyli
- Clade: †Capitosauria; Schoch and Milner, 2000

Subgroups
- †Calmasuchus; †Edingerella; †Huangfuchuansuchus; †Samarabatrachus; †Sclerothorax; †Vladlenosaurus; †Warrenisuchus; †Watsonisuchus; †Mastodonsauroidea

Synonyms
- Capitosauridae

= Capitosauria =

Capitosauria Temporal range: Early Triassic–Late Triassic

Extinct clade of amphibians

Capitosauria is an extinct group of large temnospondyl amphibians with simplified stereospondyl vertebrae. Mainly living as piscivores in lakes and rivers, the Capitosauria and its sister taxon Trematosauria were the only major labyrinthodonts that existed during the Mesozoic in ecological niches broadly similar to those of modern crocodiles, and some grew to very large sizes. At 6 meters in length, the Mid-Triassic Mastodonsaurus giganteus is not only thought to have been the largest capitosaur, but possibly also the largest amphibian to have lived. The latest known remains are from the Rhaetian of Germany and are referred to Cyclotosaurus.

Capitosauria was first named by Schoch and Milner (2000) and further described by Yates and Warren (2000), who assigned Lydekkerina and Mastodonsauroidea to it. It was described by Damiani (2001) under the name Mastodonsauroidea. In their phylogenetic analysis of temnospondyls, Ruta et al. (2007) placed Lydekkerina and its relatives within the clade Rhytidostea, while placing only mastodonsauroid taxa within Capitosauria.

== Phylogeny ==
Below is a cladogram from Fortuny et al. (2011) showing the phylogenetic relationships of capitosaurs:

- Stereospondyli
  - Lydekkerina huxleyi
  - Rhinesuchidae
    - Rhineceps nyasaensis
    - Uranocentrodon senekalensis
  - - Capitosauria
      - Wetlugasaurus angustifrons
      - - - Odenwaldia heidelbergensis
          - Vladlenosaurus alexeyevi
        - - - - Edingerella madagascariensis
              - Watsonisuchus spp.
            - - Xenotosuchus africanus
              - - Cherninia denwai
                - - Paracyclotosaurus crookshanki
                  - - - Stanocephalosaurus pronus
                      - Stanocephalosaurus birdi
                    - - Procyclotosaurus stantonensis
                      - - Eocyclotosaurus spp.
                        - Quasicyclotosaurus campi
          - - Parotosuchus orenburgensis
            - - Calmasuchus acri
              - - - Cyclotosaurus robustus
                  - Tatrasuchus wildi
                - - Eryosuchus garjainovi
                  - Mastodonsaurus giganteus
    - Trematosauria
      - Benthosuchus sushkini
      - Trematosauroidea
        - Thoosuchus yakovlevi
        - - Angusaurus spp.
          - Trematosaurus brauni
