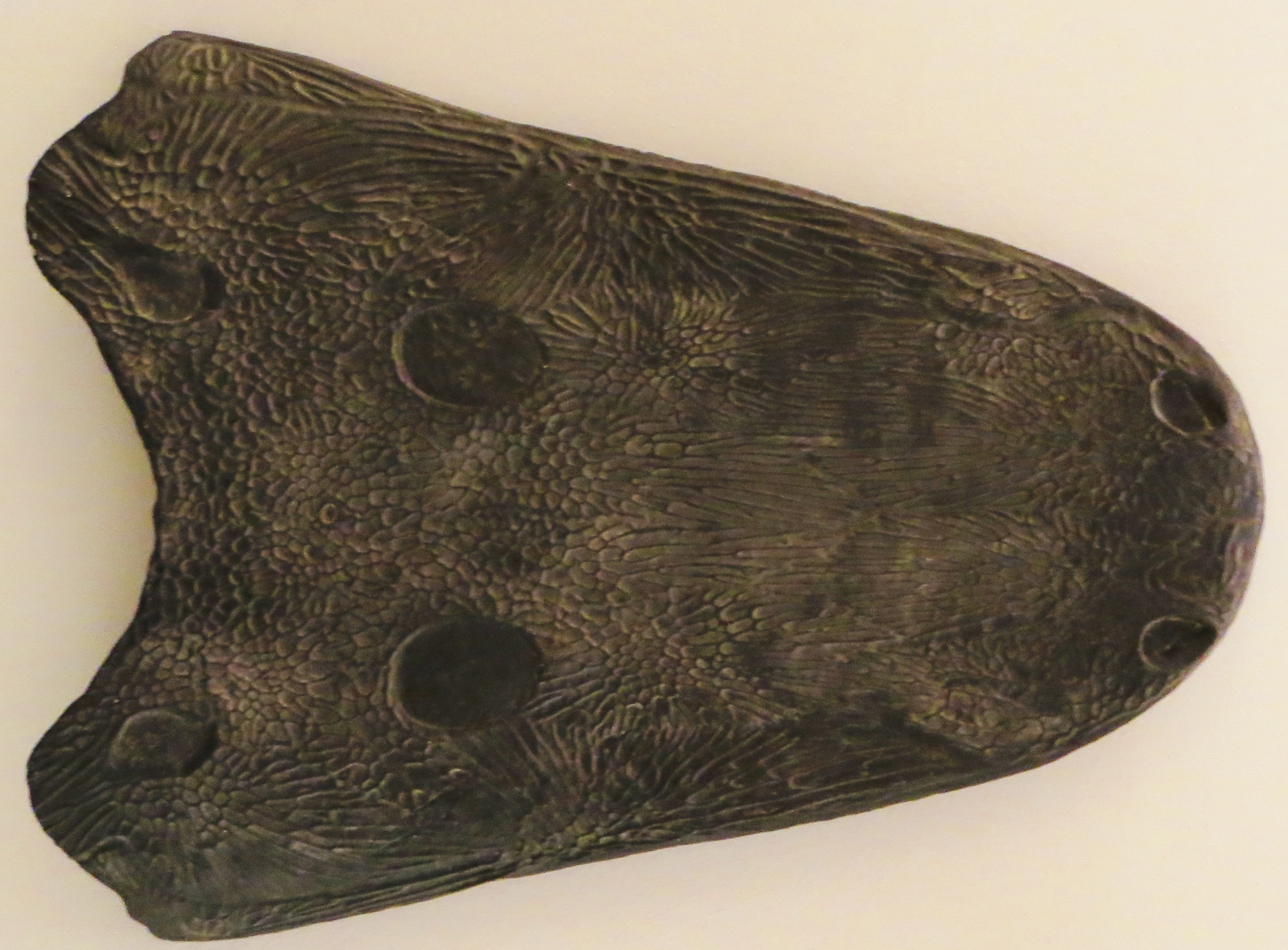
- C. robustus skull, Museum of Paleontology, Tuebingen

Scientific classification
- Kingdom: Animalia
- Phylum: Chordata
- Clade: Tetrapoda
- Order: †Temnospondyli
- Suborder: †Stereospondyli
- Clade: †Capitosauria
- Family: †Mastodonsauridae
- Genus: †Cyclotosaurus; Fraas, 1889

Type species
- †Cyclotosaurus robustus (Meyer & Plienninger, 1844)

Other species
- †C. mordax Fraas, 1913; †C. posthumus Fraas, 1913; †C. ebrachensis Kuhn, 1932; †C. hemprichi Kuhn, 1942; †C. intermedius Sulej & Majer, 2005; †C. buechneri Witzmann, Sachs & Nyhuis, 2016; †C.? papilio Wepfer, 1923; †C. naraserluki Marzola et al., 2017

Synonyms
- Mastodonsaurus robustus Meyer & Plienninger, 1844

= Cyclotosaurus =

Cyclotosaurus Temporal range: Middle Triassic–Late Triassic

Extinct genus of temnospondyls

Cyclotosaurus is an extinct genus of temnospondyl within the family Mastodonsauridae. It was of large size for an amphibian, having a skull length of about 56 cm (22 in).

== History ==
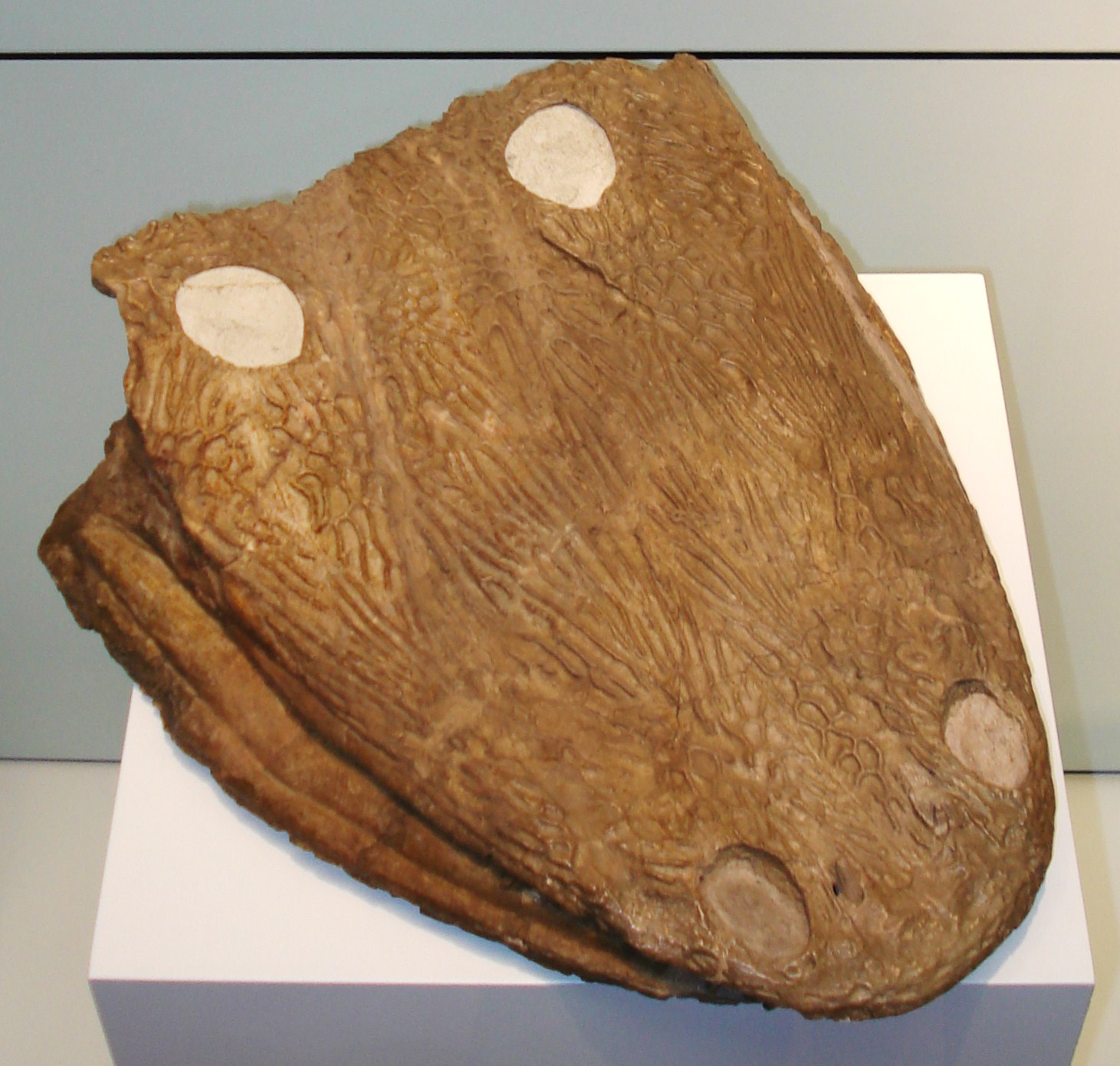
C. mordax skull

German naturalist Eberhard Fraas erected the genus Cyclotosaurus in 1889, with C. robustus (previously Mastodonsaurus robustus) as the type species. Several species are known, mainly from Germany and Poland in Central Europe, as well as East Greenland and Thailand. The relationships between species is unclear.

The name means "round eared lizard" in Ancient Greek, derived from round openings or fenestrae in the cheeks, which are thought to contain structures of the middle ear.

"Labyrinthodon" pachygnathus Owen, 1842 and "L." leptognathus Owen, 1842 were transferred to Cyclotosaurus, as C. pachygnathus and C. leptognathus, by Paton (1974). However, Damiani (2001) assigned the two species to Mastodonsauroidea indeterminate and Stereospondyli indeterminate.

=== Species ===
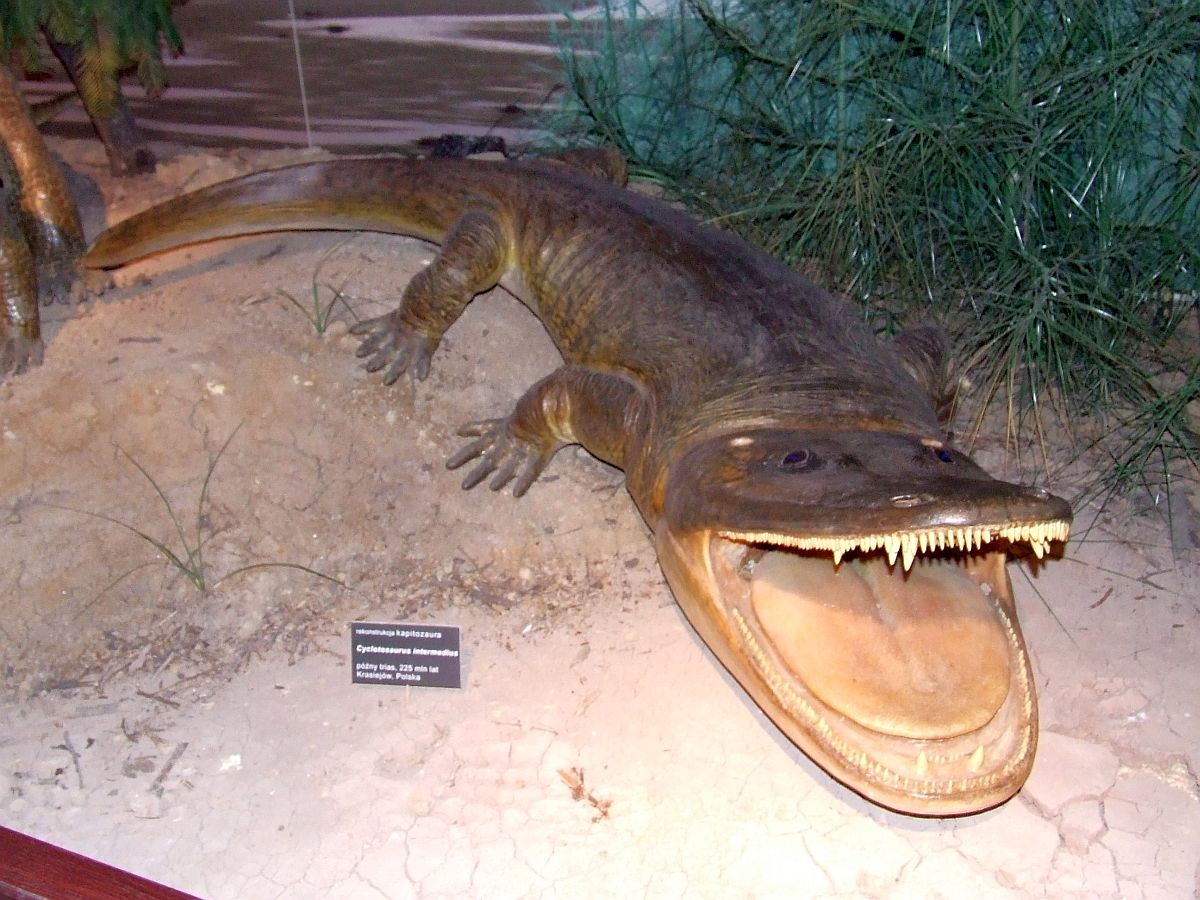
C. intermedius model

The genus is known from the Ladinian in the Middle Triassic to the Norian in the Late Triassic, and represents the last of the mastodonsaurids.

The oldest, questionable, species is Cyclotosaurus papilio, known from a partial skull recovered from the Ladinian (Middle Triassic) age Upper Muschelkalk beds from Baden-Württemberg in Germany. Cyclotosaurus robustus is known from the Carnian (Late Triassic) Schilfsandstein Formation in Stuttgart-Feuerbach in Germany, while C. ebrachensis has been described from the Blasensandstein Formation in Ebrach. Cyclotosaurus intermedius has been described from lacustrine deposits dated to the late Carnian in Krasiejów in southern Poland. It is so named as it has features intermediate between the more ancient C. robustus and more recent C. mordax. Importantly, postcranial material of this species has been recovered, which is unusual this genus. Cyclotosaurus hemprichi is known from the Norian (Late Triassic) age Knollenmergel of Halberstadt, and Cyclotosaurus posthumus from the Stubensandstein (Norian) in Pfaffenhofen. A partial skull very similar to C. posthumus has been recovered from the Norian (Late Triassic) Huai Hin Lat Formation near Chulabhorn Dam in Northeastern Thailand. In 2017, Cyclotosaurus naraserluki, a new endemic species from the Fleming Fjord Fm., East Greenland, was described as the closest Cyclotosaurus species to C. mordax, also being the westernmost and northernmost known species of Cyclotosaurus. In 2019 a Cyclotosaurus humerus was reported from a Rhaetian aged bone bed within Bonenburg clay pit in eastern North Rhine-Westphalia, Germany. This represents the only definitive non-brachyopoid Rhaetian temnospondyl, and the last known record of Capitosauria.

==== Cyclotosaurus buechneri ====
In 2016 a new species, C. buechneri, was described from the Late Triassic (middle Carnian) Stuttgart Formation of Bielefeld, the northernmost record in Germany. The type and only known specimen is a 28 cm long skull that was found in 1975 by Martin Büchner, the former director of the Natural History Museum Bielefeld, at a construction site in Bielefeld-Sieker, Germany. The specimen derives from the Stuttgart Formation and is kept in the collection of the Natural History Museum in Bielefeld. In 2016, Florian Witzmann, Sven Sachs and Christian Nyhuis provided a detailed description of the skull and established the new species, Cyclotosaurus buechneri, honoring the discoverer. Cyclotosaurus buechneri differs from other species of Cyclotosaurus e.g. by a narrower distance between the orbitae, a more slender postorbital region and a distinct shape of the jugal. It was nearly 2 meter long and is the only unequivocal evidence of a cyclotosaur in northern Germany.

== Phylogeny ==
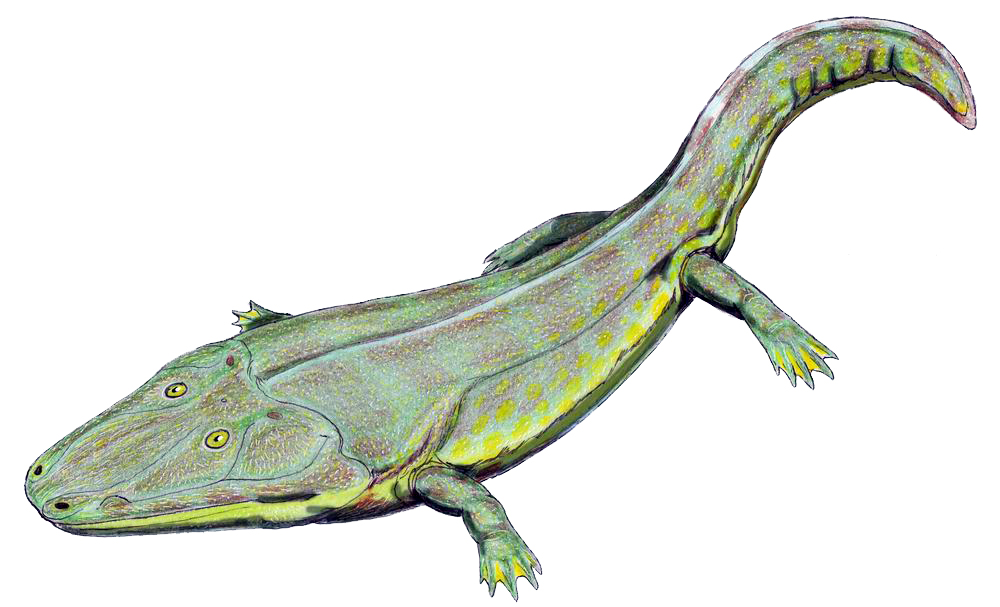
Life restoration

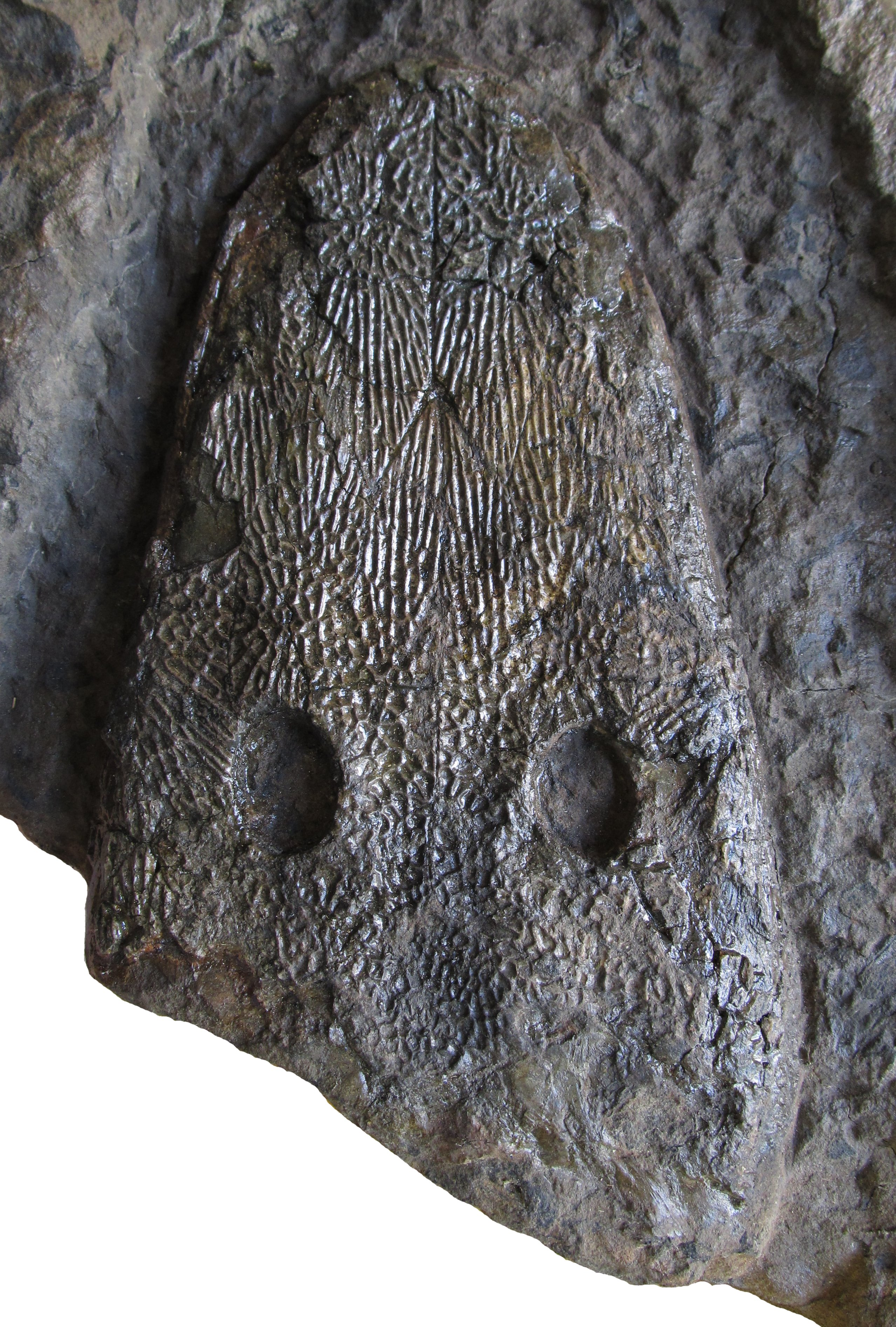
C. buechneri skull

The phylogeny of Capitosauroidea according to Witzmann et al. (2016).

- Capitosauroidea
  - Eryosuchus
  - - Kupferzellia
    - - Procyclotosaurus
      - - Paracyclotosaurus
        - - Mastodonsaurus
            - Mastodonsaurus cappelensis
            - Mastodonsaurus giganteus
          - - Cyclotosaurus
            - - Quasicyclotosaurus
              - Eocyclotosaurus

The phylogeny of the genus Cyclotosaurus according to Witzmann et al. (2016).

- Cyclotosaurus
  - C. robustus
  - - C. buechneri
    - - C. mordax
      - - C. ebrachensis
        - C. intermedius
      - - C. posthumus
        - C. hemprichi

See also alternative phylogenies from 2017 with the description of C. naraserluki.

== Palaeoecology ==
Cyclotosaurus are thought to have been semi-aquatic carnivores, though feeding strategies likely differed between species.
