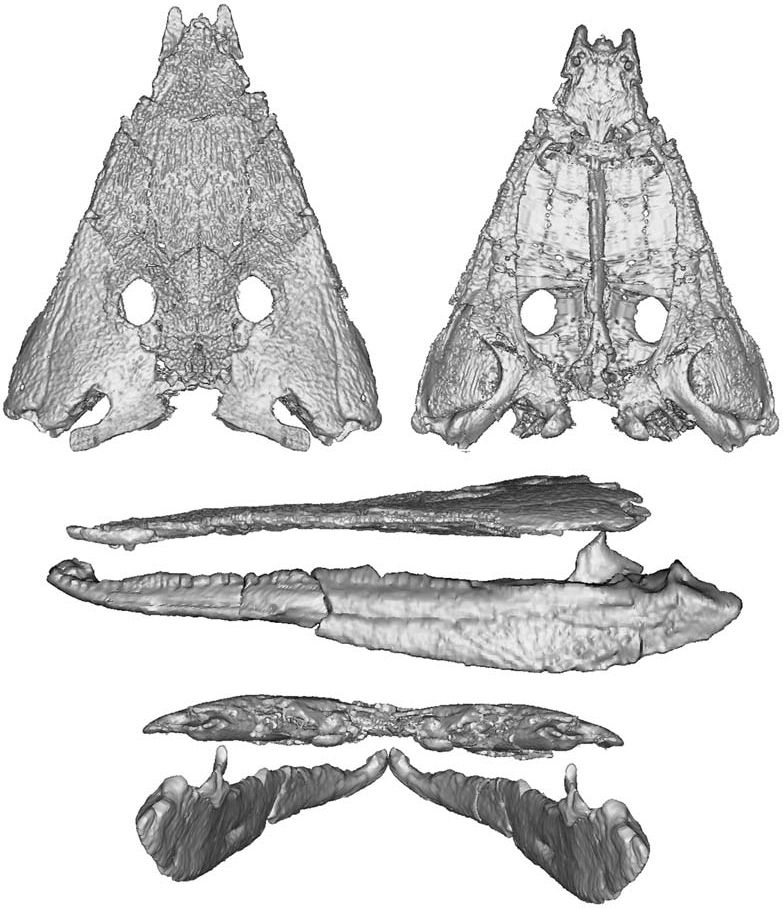
- Computed tomographic reconstruction

Scientific classification
- Kingdom: Animalia
- Phylum: Chordata
- Clade: Tetrapoda
- Order: †Temnospondyli
- Suborder: †Stereospondyli
- Clade: †Capitosauria
- Genus: †Calmasuchus; Fortuny et al., 2011

Type species
- †Calmasuchus acri Fortuny et al., 2011

= Calmasuchus =

Calmasuchus Temporal range: Middle Triassic, Anisian

Extinct genus of temnospondyls

Calmasuchus is a genus of capitosaurian temnospondyl which lived during the middle Triassic (lower-middle Anisian age). Fossils of Calmasuchus have been recovered from the La Mora site of the Catalan basin in Barcelona of Spain. Identified from a partial skull roof and palate (holotype IPS-37401 (LM-83)), skull fragments (IPS-37401 (LM-63, LM-101, L and M1)) and complete hemi-mandible (IPS-12 42407 (LM-4)), it was named by Josep Fortuny, Àngel Galobart and Carles De Santisteban in 2011. The type species is Calmasuchus acri.
