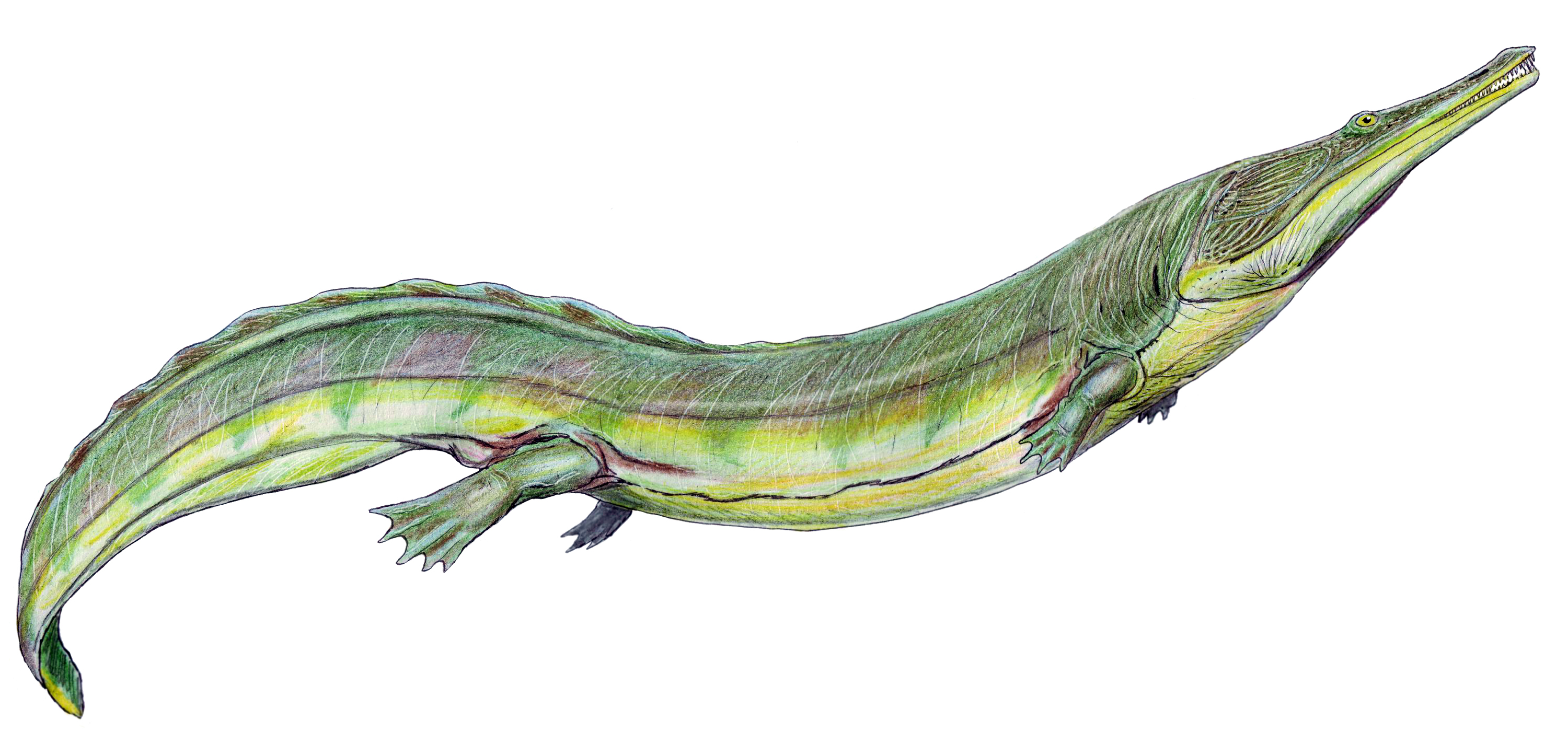
- Trematosaurus

Scientific classification
- Domain: Eukaryota
- Kingdom: Animalia
- Phylum: Chordata
- Order: †Temnospondyli
- Suborder: †Stereospondyli
- Clade: †Trematosauria
- Superfamily: †Trematosauroidea; Watson, 1919

Families and genera
- †Benthosuchus; †Thoosuchus; †Trematosauridae

= Trematosauroidea =

Trematosauroidea Temporal range: Early Triassic - Middle Jurassic, 247–227 Ma

Extinct superfamily of amphibians

Trematosauroidea are an important group of Triassic temnospondyl amphibians. They flourished briefly during the Early Triassic, occurring worldwide before declining at the start of the Middle Triassic, although the group continued until the Late Triassic. They were medium-sized temnospondyls with wedge-shaped tails, narrow skulls, and, in advanced forms, elongated snouts. The latter feature was probably an adaptation for feeding on fish. The largest and most specialized family, the Trematosauridae, are the only batrachomorphs to have adapted to a marine lifestyle with the exception of the modern crab-eating frog.

A temnospondyl ilium was described in 2004 from the Callovian Toutunhe Formation in the Junggar Basin of China. Although the isolated bone was impossible to identify on the species level, it was referred to Trematosauroidea. The presence of this bone in the Toutunhe Formation extends the range of trematosauroids into the Middle Jurassic, making it one of only three groups of temnospondyls that survived the Triassic-Jurassic extinction event (the other two being the Brachyopoidea and possibly the Capitosauria).

== Classification ==
Below is a cladogram modified from Schoch (2011):

- Stereospondyli
  - Uranocentrodon
  - - Lydekkerina
    - - - Rhytidosteidae
        - - Brachyopomorpha
            - Siderops
            - Batrachosuchus
          - Plagiosauroidea
            - Laidleria
            - - Plagiosuchus
              - Gerrothorax
      - Capitosauria
      - Trematosauroidea
        - Lyrocephaliscus
        - - Trematolestes
          - - - Inflectosaurus
              - - Microposaurus
                - Jordan taxon
            - - Almasaurus
              - Callistomordax
