= Procyclotosaurus =

Procyclotosaurus Temporal range: Ladinian, ~241.464–237 Ma

Scientific classification
- Kingdom: Animalia
- Phylum: Chordata
- Clade: Tetrapoda
- Order: †Temnospondyli
- Suborder: †Stereospondyli
- Clade: †Capitosauria
- Family: †Stenotosauridae
- Genus: †Procyclotosaurus; Watson, 1958

Species
- †P. stantonensis (Woodward, 1904 [originally Capitosaurus stantonensis) (type)

Extinct genus of temnospondyls

Procyclotosaurus is an extinct genus of stenotosaurid capitosaurian temnospondyl. The type species is P. stantonensis. In 1904, English paleontologist Arthur Smith Woodward described it as a species of Capitosaurus, C. stantonensis, based on a partial skull known as NHMUK PV R 3174. In 1958, the species was assigned to the new genus. It is known from the Lower Keuper, a European stratigraphic unit that was deposited during the late Middle Triassic. Fossils have been found from Staffordshire, England.

== Description ==
Procyclotosaurus was a relatively small temnospondyl. Unlike most other capitosaurs, which have wide and flat skulls, Procyclotosaurus has a deep, wedge-shaped skull. The otic notch, a notch at the back of the skull, is closed. The tabular horn above the otic notch is narrow and touches the squamosal bone below the notch. The upper surface of the skull is concave, making it appear dish-shaped. Like other capitosaurs, Procyclotosaurus resembles crocodilians in that it has orbits (eye sockets) and nares (nostrils) that are directed upward and slightly elevated.

== History and classification ==
Procyclotosaurus stantonensis was first classified as a species of Capitosaurus and was placed in the family Capitosauridae (now known as Mastodonsauridae). It was later reassigned as a species of Cyclotosaurus, another mastodonsaurid genus. In 1958, paleontologist D.M.S. Watson placed the species in its own genus, Procyclotosaurus, distinguishing it from both Capitosaurus and Cyclotosaurus on the basis of its deep skull. Watson also found the short suture between the exoccipital and pterygoid bones to be characteristic of the genus. He also noted that Procyclotosaurus has a crista obliqua, or oblique ridge, on the pterygoid bone at the back of the skull. This ridge is a primitive feature among temnospondyls that is not seen in more derived mastodonsaurids.

The holotype of Procyclotosaurus, NHMUK PV R 3174, is thought to be a young adult. The sutures between the bones of the skull are clearly visible and have not fully closed. The skull is pitted and some of the pits have elongated into troughs, a sign of age. However, these troughs are not as prominent as they would be in an older individual. Paleontologist Roberta L. Paton considered the deep skull and close-set eyes of Procyclotosaurus to be indicative of a young Cyclotosaurus individual rather than a distinct genus. Therefore, in 1974, Paton reassigned Procyclotosaurus stantonensis to Cyclotosaurus. Paton also considered C. stantonensis to be synonymous with the species C. leptognathus, named by English paleontologist Richard Owen, and referred NHMUK PV R 3174 to C. leptognathus.
