= Quasicyclotosaurus =

Scientific classification
- Kingdom: Animalia
- Phylum: Chordata
- Clade: Tetrapoda
- Order: †Temnospondyli
- Suborder: †Stereospondyli
- Clade: †Capitosauria
- Superfamily: †Mastodonsauroidea
- Genus: †Quasicyclotosaurus; Schoch, 2000

Type species
- †Quasicyclotosaurus campi Schoch, 2000

Extinct genus of temnospondyls

Quasicyclotosaurus is an extinct genus of mastodonsauroid temnospondyl. The type and only species is Q. campi from the Triassic Moenkopi Formation in Arizona.

== History of study ==
Quasicyclotosaurus campi was named by Schoch (2000) for several cranial specimens, the holotype of which (UCMP 37754) is a complete skull collected in 1945 by Samuel Welles from the Holbrook 5 quarry near Holbrook, Arizona. The type locality is within the Holbrook Member of the Moenkopi Formation, making it Middle Triassic in age. Several other specimens, mostly uncatalogued at the UCMP at the time of the original description, were assigned to this taxon from coeval deposits at the Jennings quarry (Navajo County). The generic epithet refers to the similarity to the genus Cyclotosaurus, and the species epithet honors Charles Camp. This taxon was also referred to as the "Moenkopi heylerosaurine" in Schoch & Milner (2000).

Some material referred to the invalid "Moenkopisaurus randalli" may belong to Q. campi.

== Anatomy ==
The skull of Q. campi is longer than wide but proportionately shorter than some other capitosaurs, such as the coeval Eocyclotosaurus. Like other cyclotosaurids, the otic notches are fully closed. Schoch (2000) diagnosed the taxon by: (1) palatine ramus of pterygoid is anteriorly extensive, leading to constriction of the interpterygoid vacuities; the medial separation of the premaxillary aperature is only formed by the premaxilla; the transvomerine tooth row is on an elevated ridge; the basicranial suture is very short; and the choana forms a wide oval. Other notable features include a prefrontal-postfrontal contact, a postorbital-prefrontal contact, and a thin, keeled cultriform process.

== Phylogenetic relationships ==
Schoch (2000) originally classified Quasicyclotosaurus as an indeterminate cyclotosaurid (not placed within a subfamily), even though Schoch & Milner (2000) refer to it as a heylerosaurine. More recent analyses have consistently recovered a sister relationship to Eocyclotosaurus, although this pairing is not always recovered as closely related to Cyclotosaurus.

== See also ==
- Prehistoric amphibian
- List of prehistoric amphibians
