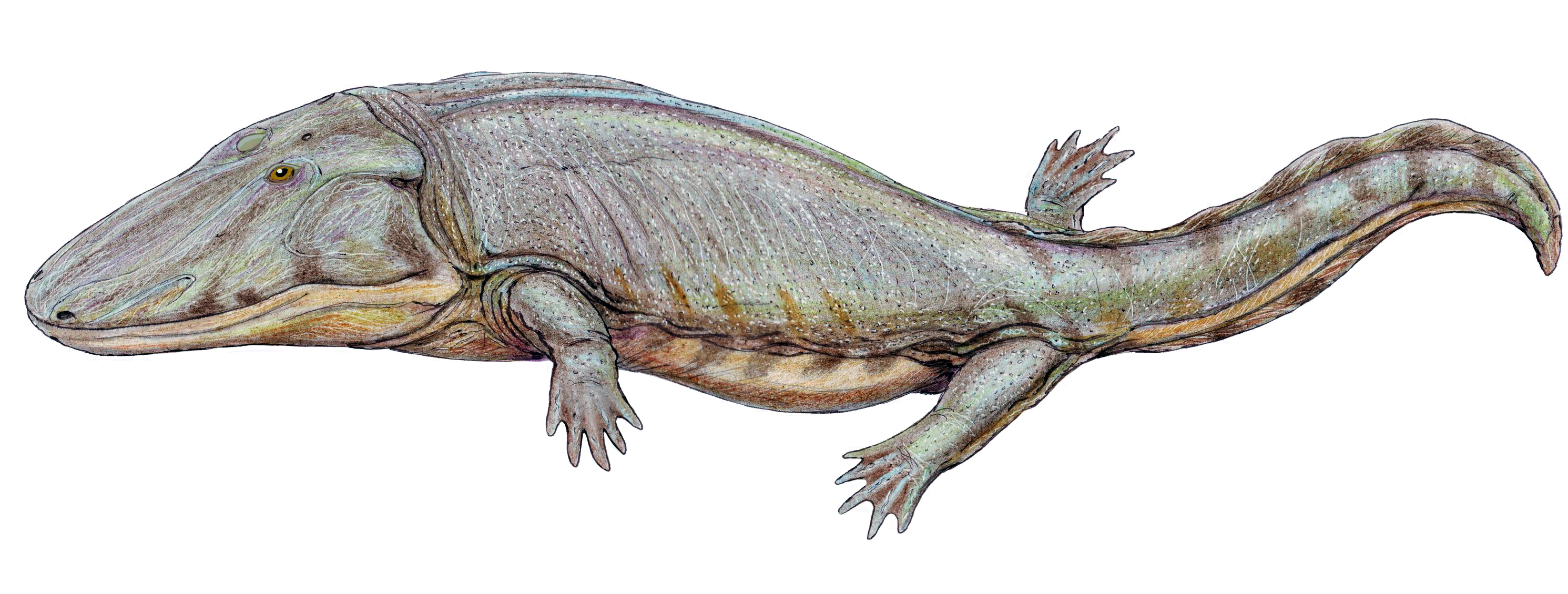
- Restoration of Paracyclotosaurus

Scientific classification
- Domain: Eukaryota
- Kingdom: Animalia
- Phylum: Chordata
- Order: †Temnospondyli
- Suborder: †Stereospondyli
- Clade: †Capitosauria
- Superfamily: †Mastodonsauroidea; Lydekker, 1885

Subgroups
- †Antarctosuchus; †Stenotosauridae; †Heylerosauridae; †Mastodonsauridae

Synonyms
- Capitosauroidea Watson, 1919

= Mastodonsauroidea =

Mastodonsauroids Temporal range: 251.0–201.4 Ma Early Triassic - Middle Jurassic

Extinct superfamily of amphibians

The Mastodonsauroidea are an extinct superfamily of temnospondyl amphibians known from the Triassic. Fossils belonging to this superfamily have been found in North America, Greenland, Europe, Asia, and Australia. Ferganobatrachus from the Jurassic of Asia was initially assigned to this superfamily, but is now considered to be congeneric with the brachyopid Gobiops.
