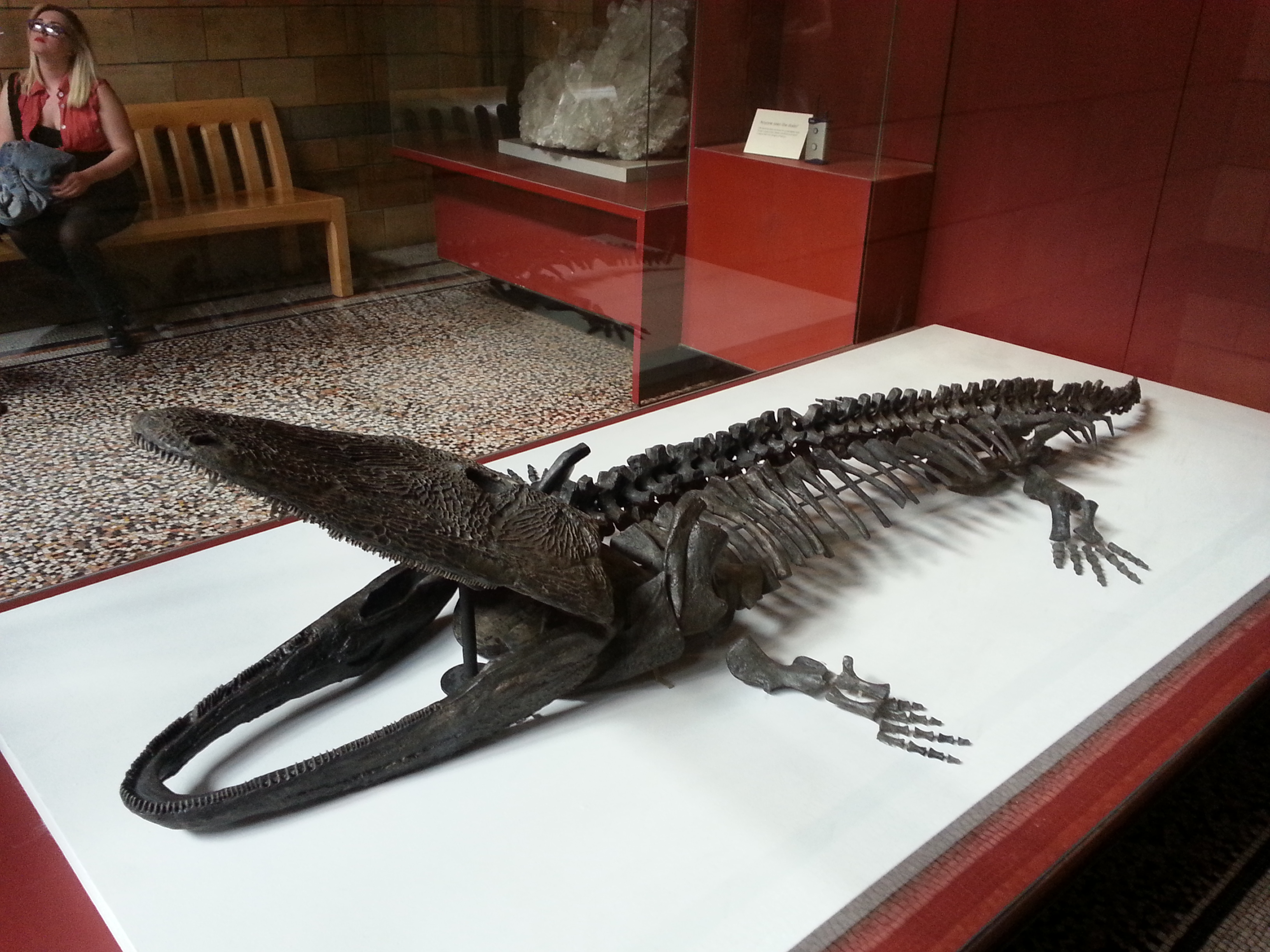
- Paracyclotosaurus davidi in the Natural History Museum of London: specimen NHMUK PV R 6000.

Scientific classification
- Kingdom: Animalia
- Phylum: Chordata
- Clade: Tetrapoda
- Order: †Temnospondyli
- Suborder: †Stereospondyli
- Clade: †Capitosauria
- Family: †Mastodonsauridae
- Genus: †Paracyclotosaurus; Watson, 1958

Species
- †P. davidi Watson, 1958 (type); †P. crookshanki Damiani, 2001; †P. morganorum Damiani and Hancox, 2003

= Paracyclotosaurus =

Paracyclotosaurus Temporal range: Middle Triassic 247.2–242.0 Ma

Extinct genus of temnospondyls

Paracyclotosaurus (meaning "Near Wheeled Lizard") is an extinct genus of temnospondyl, which would have appeared similar to today's salamander – but much larger, measuring up to 2.45 m (8.0 ft) long and weighing between 159 and 365 kg (351 and 805 lb). It lived in the Middle Triassic period, about 235 million years ago, and fossils have been found in Australia, India, and South Africa.

Although they could live on dry land, Paracyclotosaurus probably spent most of its time in water. They had flattened bodies and elongated heads, almost 60 centimetres (2 ft) long, that vaguely resembled those of modern crocodiles.

== Discovery and naming ==
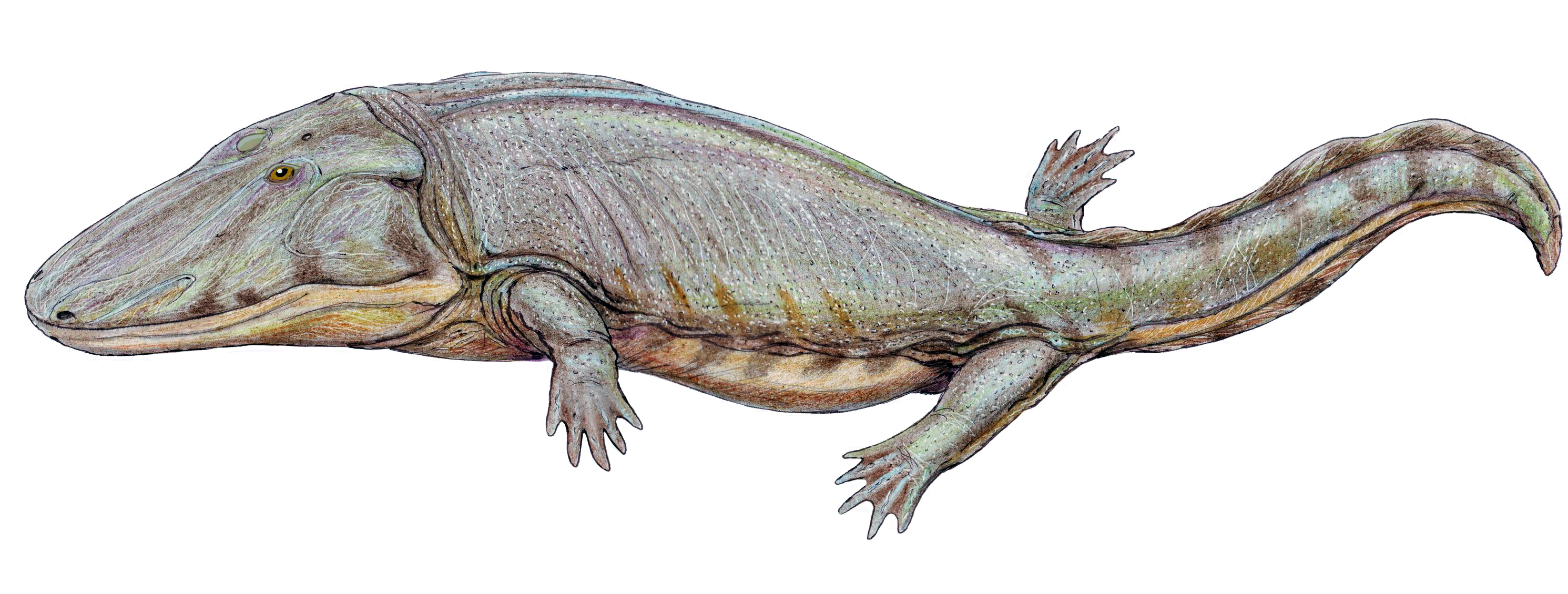
Paracyclotosaurus davidi restoration

The type species P. davidi is only known from one complete specimen recovered from Australia. It was discovered by quarry miners in a brick pit in St. Peters in Sydney, New South Wales. The discovery, made in 1910, was from a large ironstone nodule within Ashfield Shale which contained the nearly complete skeleton. The reconstruction was finished in July 1914, and was initially determined to be closely related to Cyclotosaurus. The original bone of the P. davidi holotype specimen was in very bad condition, but after the bone was removed from the hard ironstone matrix, casts were made from the matrix mold, and a mold was made from those casts. Casts of the original bone show a fair amount of detail.

Paracyclotosaurus davidii was named after Sir Edgeworth David, the man who arranged for the British Museum (Natural History) to acquire the specimen.

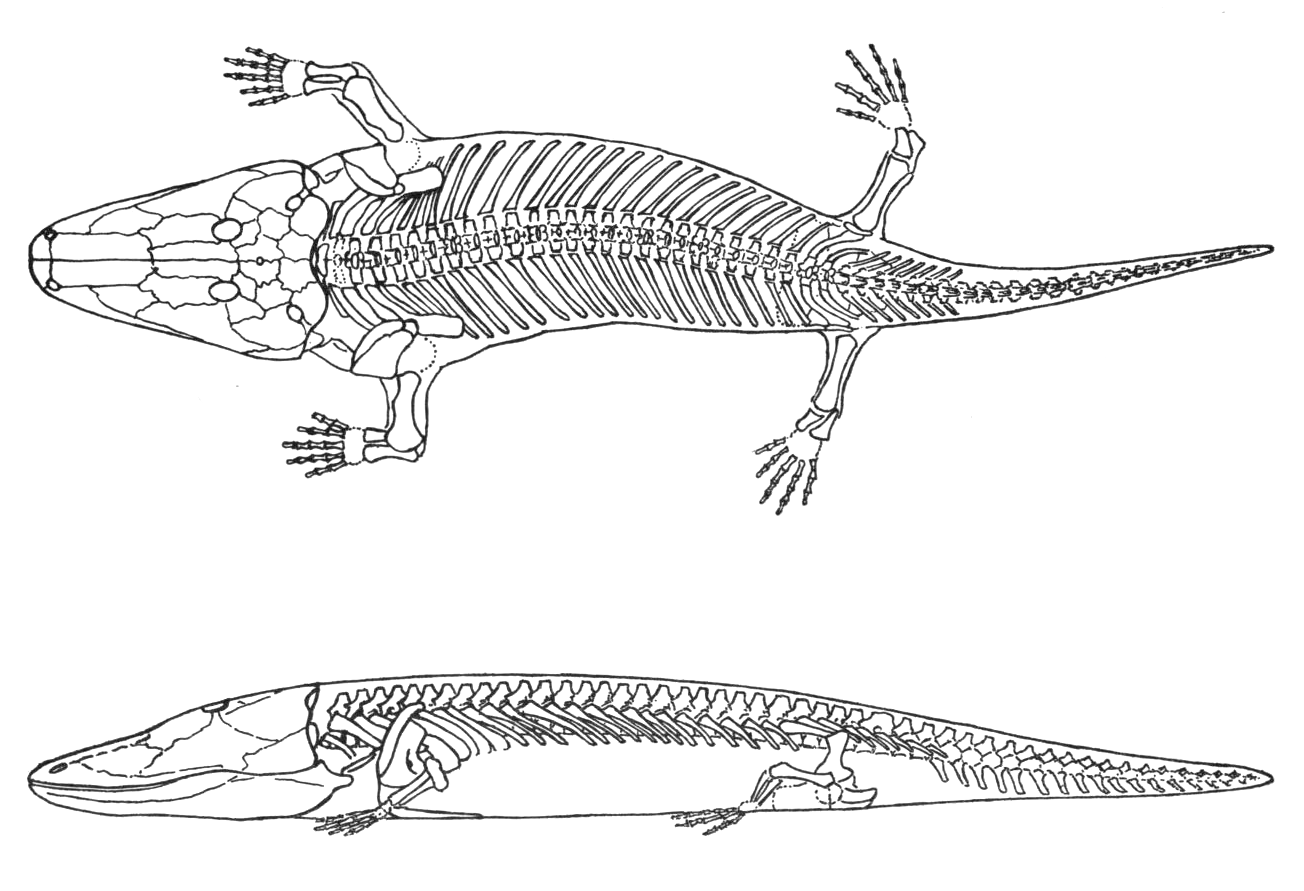
Paracyclotosaurus davidi skeletal diagram

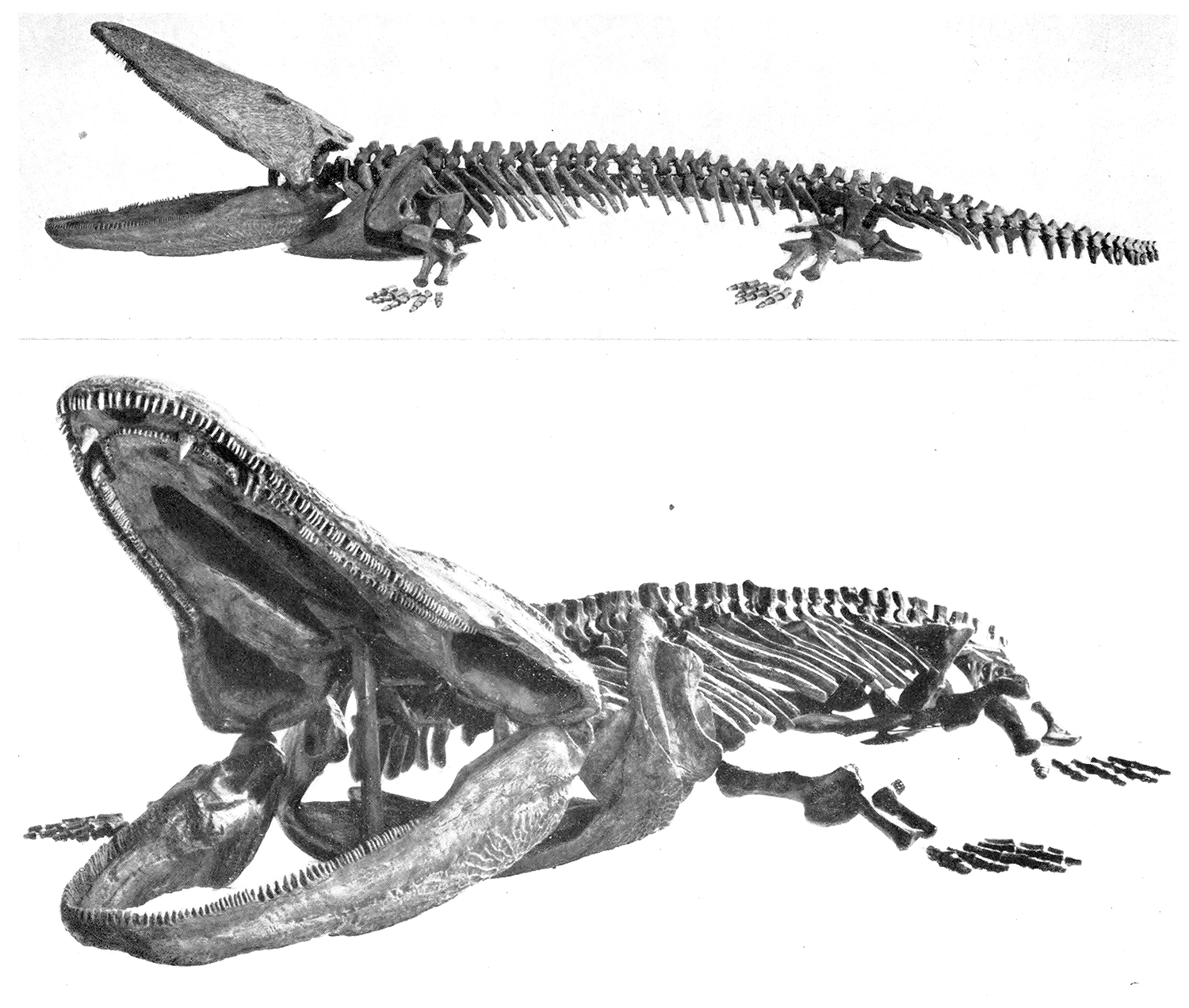
Paracyclotosaurus davidi skeletal reconstruction (NHMUK PV R 6000)

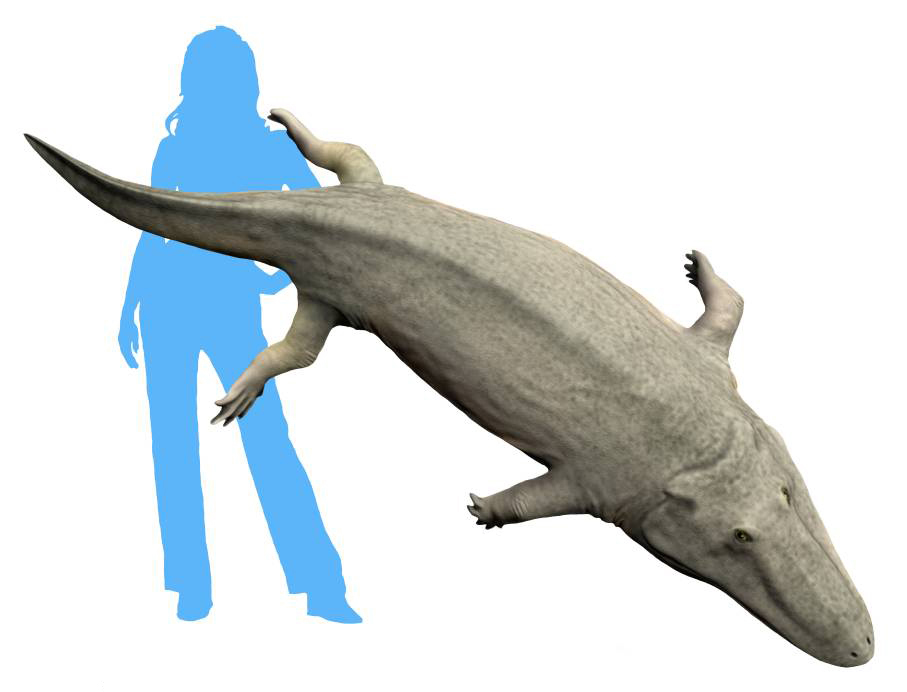
Paracyclotosaurus crookshanki life restoration
