= Buzuluksky District =

Buzuluksky District Бузулукский район (Russian)
- District
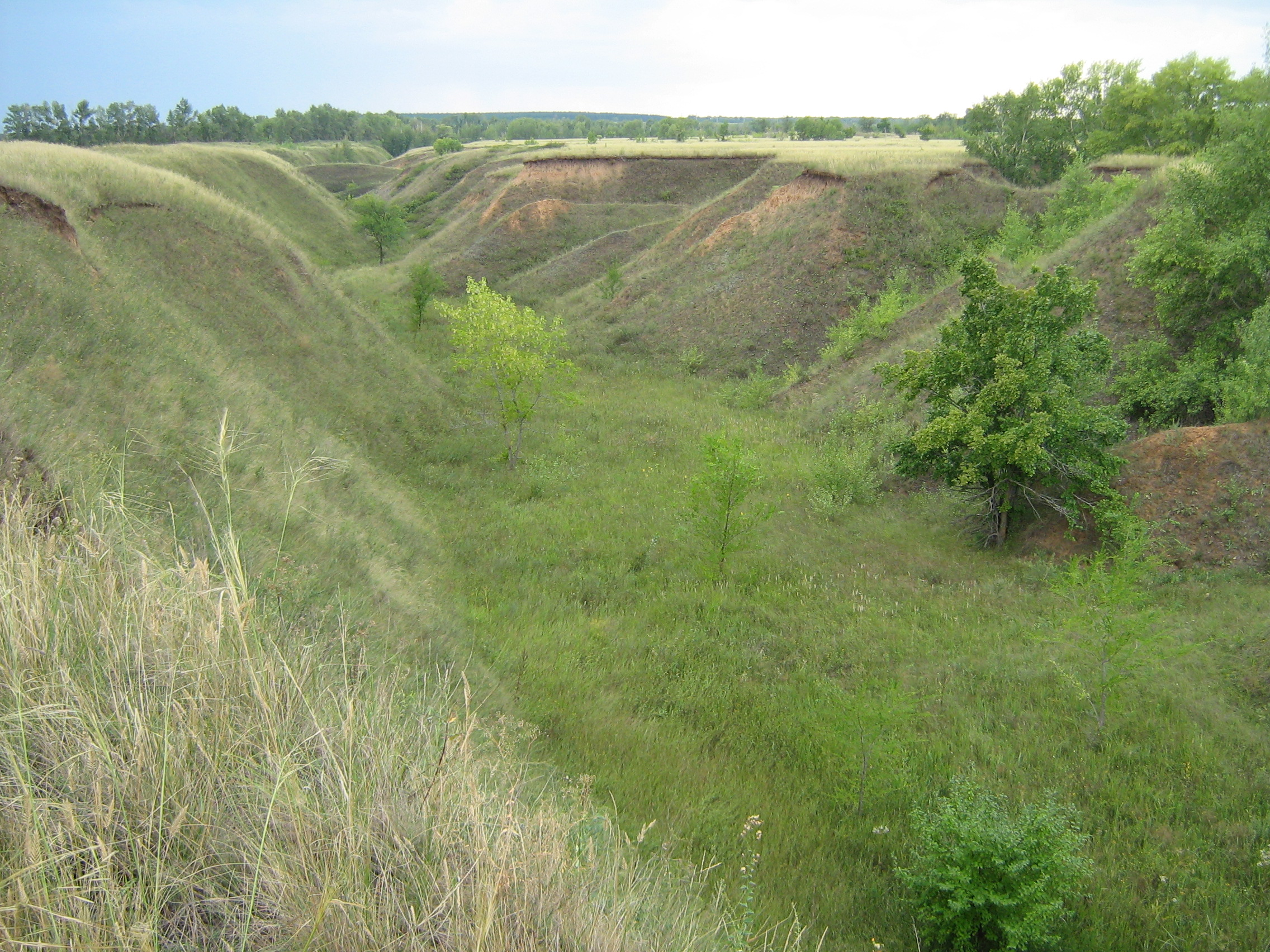
- Dry Ravine, Buzuluksky District

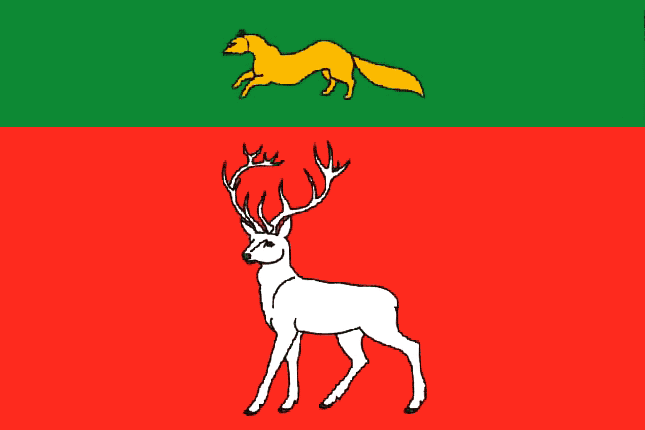
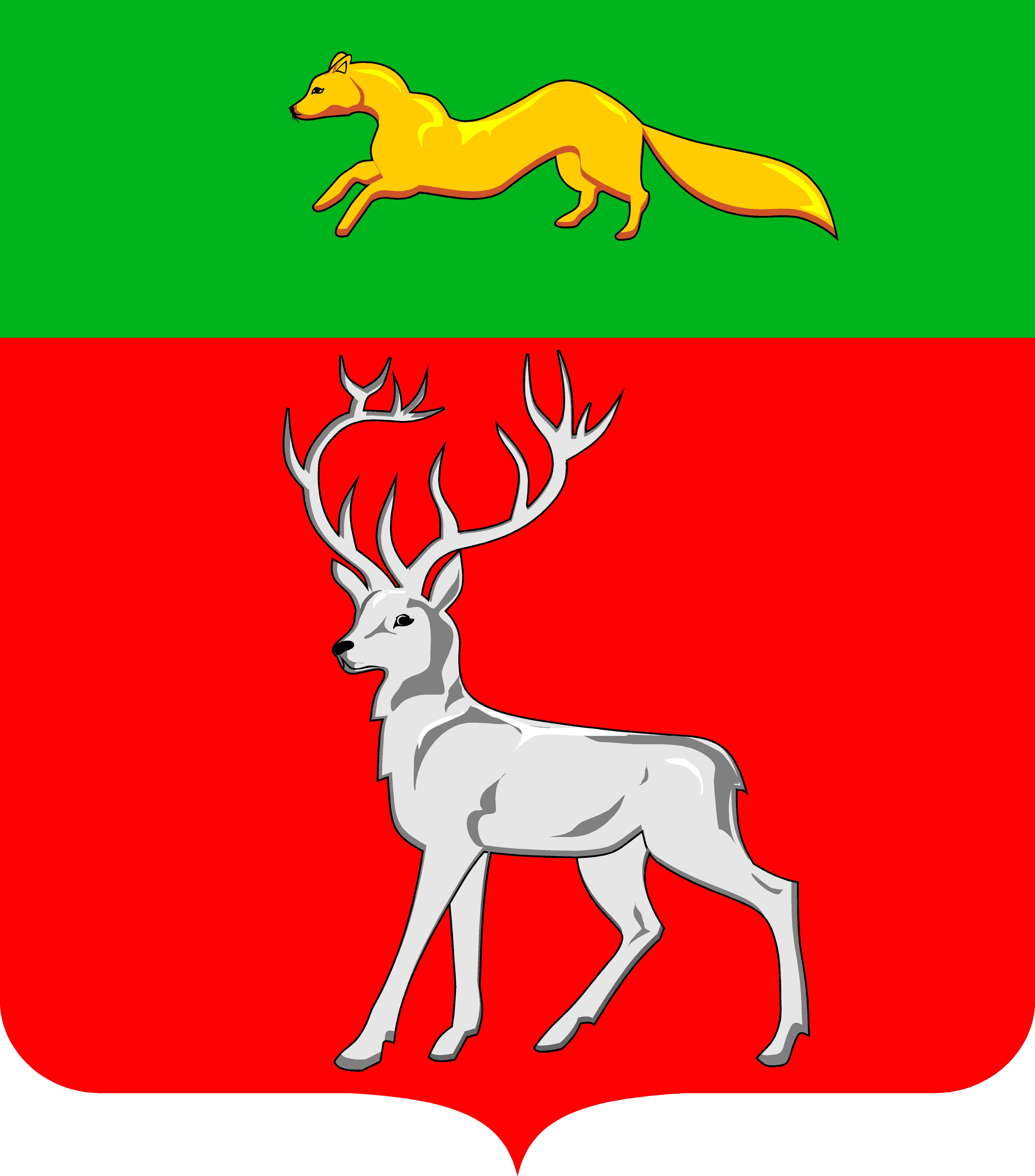
- Flag Coat of arms
- Location of Buzuluksky District in Orenburg Oblast
- Coordinates: 52°47′N 52°15′E
- Country: Russia
- Federal subject: Orenburg Oblast
- Established: 16 July 1928
- Administrative center: Buzuluk

Area
  - Total: 3,800 km^{2} (1,500 sq mi)

Population (2010 Census)
  - Total: 31,071
  - Density: 8.2/km^{2} (21/sq mi)
  - Urban: 0%
  - Rural: 100%

Administrative structure
  - Administrative divisions: 29 Selsoviets
  - Inhabited localities: 83 rural localities

Municipal structure
  - Municipally incorporated as: Buzuluksky Municipal District
  - Municipal divisions: 0 urban settlements, 28 rural settlements
- Time zone: UTC+5 (MSK+2)
- OKTMO ID: 53612000
- Website: http://bz.orb.ru/

Buzuluksky District (Russian: Бузулу́кский райо́н) is an administrative and municipal district (raion), one of the thirty-five in Orenburg Oblast, Russia. It is located in the west of the oblast. The area of the district is 3,800 square kilometers (1,500 sq mi). Its administrative center is the town of Buzuluk (which is not administratively a part of the district). Population: 31,071 (2010 Census); 33,113 (2002 census); 30,374 (1989 Soviet census).

== Administrative and municipal status ==
Within the framework of administrative divisions, Buzuluksky District is one of the thirty-five in the oblast. The town of Buzuluk serves as its administrative center, despite being incorporated separately as an administrative unit with the status equal to that of the districts.

As a municipal division, the district is incorporated as Buzuluksky Municipal District. The Town of Buzuluk is incorporated separately from the district as Buzuluk Urban Okrug.

== Paleontology ==
In the Lower Triassic of Buzuluksky District fossils of temnospondyls and primitive reptiliomorphs were found. Extinct taxa of the Induan stage are Selenocara, Tupilakosaurus, Syrtosuchus and Axitectum. Younger animals from the Lower Olenekian are Benthosuchus, Wetlugasaurus, Trematotegmen, Thoosuchus, Qantas, Angusaurus, Dromotectum, Selenocara, Prothoosuchus and probably Tupilakosaurus.
