= Tsylmosuchus =

Tsylmosuchus Temporal range: Early Triassic Induan–Olenekian

Scientific classification
- Kingdom: Animalia
- Phylum: Chordata
- Class: Reptilia
- Family: †Proterosuchidae
- Subfamily: †Chasmatosuchinae
- Genus: †Tsylmosuchus; Sennikov, 1990

Species
- T. jakovlevi Sennikov, 1990 (type); T. samarensis Sennikov, 1990; T. donensis Sennikov, 1990

Synonyms
- Scythosuchus basileus? Sennikov, 1999

Extinct genus of reptiles

Tsylmosuchus is an extinct genus of proterosuchid archosauriform reptile known from Western Russia. Fossils referred to Tsylmosuchus occurred over a wide area in sediments corresponding to the Induan and Olenekian stages of the Early Triassic. Most of these fossils are fragmentary neck vertebrae which were originally reported as sharing similarities with crocodile-line archosaurs (pseudosuchians) such as Mandasuchus. As a result, Tsylmosuchus was first described as part of the family Rauisuchidae, making it supposedly one of the oldest known archosaurs. However, its fragmentary remains do not show any of the distinguishing features of rauisuchids or even pseudosuchians in general, so Tsylmosuchus has more recently been interpreted as an indeterminate archosauriform. Although three species of Tsylmosuchus have been named, they lack diagnostic traits and are probably not distinct from each other. In 2023, Tsylmosuchus was reinterpreted as a proterosuchid, specifically a member of the subfamily Chasmatosuchinae.

== Discovery ==
The genus is named after the Tsilma River, near where fossils have been found. Three species were named along with the original genus in 1990, their holotypes each comprising a single cervical (neck) vertebra and all of them only tentatively differentiated by their ages. The holotype of the type species T. jakovlevi was found near Ust'-Tsylma in the Komi Republic. This specimen and other referred material (such as ilia) come from the Mezen' and Pechora river basins, which preserve sediments of the Sludkian and Ustmylian gorizonts (early Olenekian). Some material once referred to the proterosuchid Chasmatosuchus magnus has since been referred to this species. T. donensis comes from the Donskaya Luka site in Volgograd Oblast, which preserves the Lipovskaya Formation of the Yarenskain Gorizont (Upper Olenekian).

Tsylmosuchus samariensis, described from a single site in Borskoi (Samara Oblast, along the Obshchy Syrt) dating to the Rybinskian Gorizont (Induan), was synonymized with Chasmatosuchus rossicus by Ezcurra (2016), who also made the Tsylmosuchus type species a nomen dubium. However, in 2023, Ezcurra and colleagues reversed this decision and placed all three species in Tsylmosuchus again, and found the genus to be a proterosuchid.

== Description ==
Tsylmosuchus is known primarily from vertebrae. These vertebrae have been compared to "rauisuchid" vertebrae, from the Manda Beds of Tanzania, which are now referred to Mandasuchus. Like several contemporary "rauisuchians" (Energosuchus and Vytshegdosuchus), Tsylmosuchus has elongated cervical vertebrae. This would have given it a relatively long neck.

Nesbitt (2009) suggested that elongated cervical vertebrae were present in numerous archosauriform clades, and that the length of the cervical vertebrae depended on the position in the presacral column, as seen in the poposauroid Arizonasaurus and the non-archosaurian archosauriform Guchengosuchus. The holotypes of each of the three species consist of a single cervical vertebra, which does not bear any other clear autapomorphies. Furthermore, the material referred to these species cannot be shown to belong to the same taxa as the holotypes. Thus, Nesbitt (2009) considered all three species to represent invalid archosauriforms.

Sennikov (2022) interpreted Tsylmosuchus as a member of the Ctenosauriscidae and also suggested that Scythosuchus may have been the same animal as Tsylmosuchus. In contrast, it was recovered as a member of the Proterosuchidae by Ezcurra et al. (2023), who reversed some of his previous reclassifications of the genus.

== Paleobiology ==
Along with small proterosuchids such as Chasmatosuchus, Tsylmosuchus and other large archosauriforms were the top predators in Early Triassic European Russia. Tsylmosuchus was part of what are referred to as the Benthosuchus-Wetlugasaurus fauna (a.k.a. the Ustmylian and Rybinskian gorizonts) and the Parotosuchus fauna (a.k.a. the Yarenskian Gorizont). These faunas extend through the early and late Olenekian stage. They are known from hundreds of sites throughout eastern Europe and preserve a wide array of temnospondyls (primarily trematosaurids), procolophonids, and early archosauriforms. They correspond to a massive river basin, which likely experienced a trend of increasing humidity during the later part of the Olenekian.
