= Ileksky District =

District in Orenburg Oblast, Russia

Ileksky District Илекский район (Russian)
- District
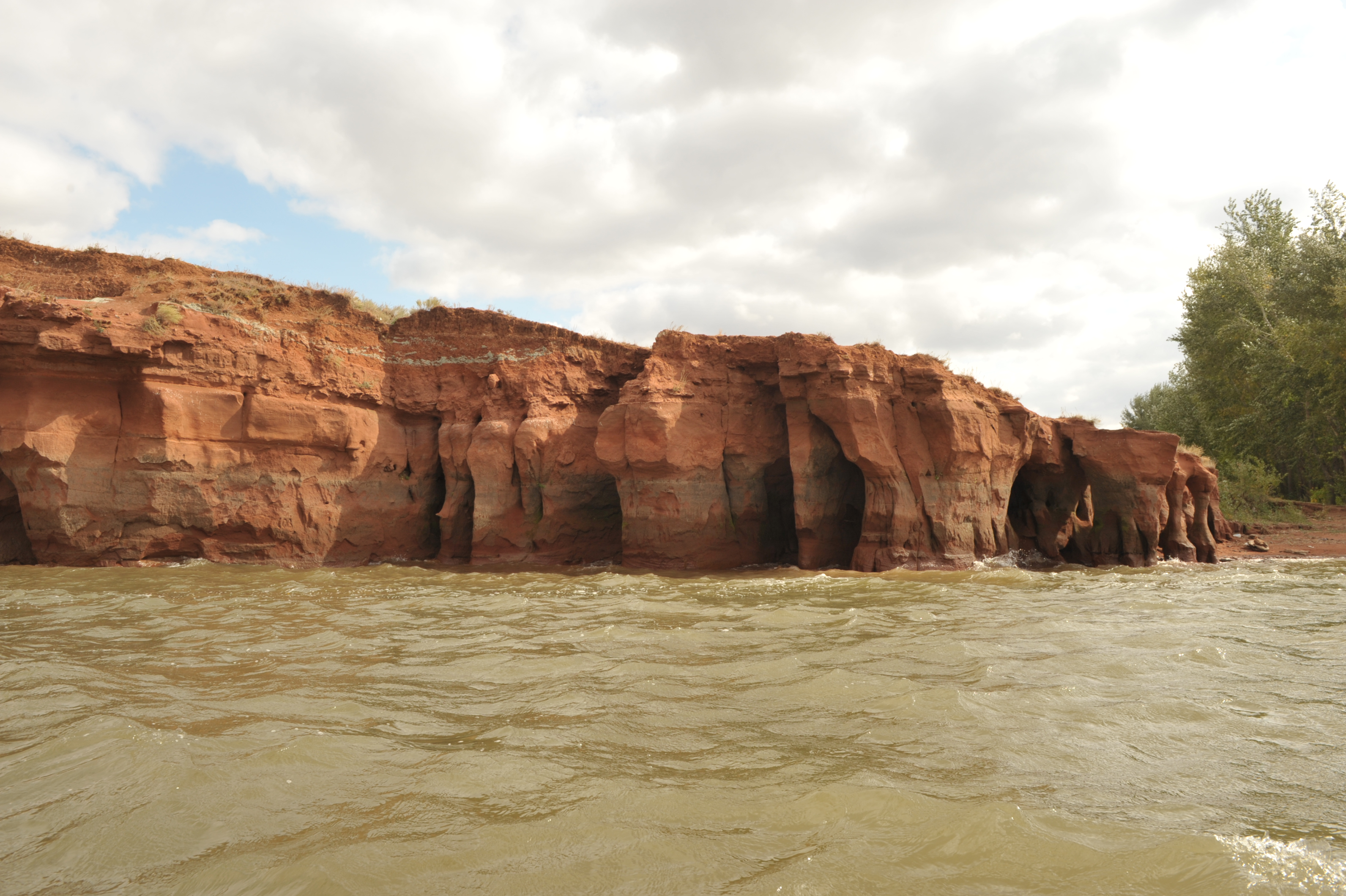
- Red Cliff, Chernovskoe Reservoir, Ileksky District

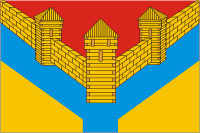
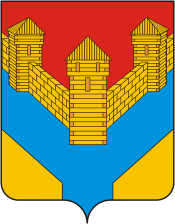
- Flag Coat of arms
- Location of Ileksky District in Orenburg Oblast
- Coordinates: 51°31′30″N 53°22′50″E
- Country: Russia
- Federal subject: Orenburg Oblast
- Established: 30 May 1927
- Administrative center: Ilek

Area
  - Total: 3,700 km^{2} (1,400 sq mi)

Population (2010 Census)
  - Total: 25,150
  - Density: 6.8/km^{2} (18/sq mi)
  - Urban: 0%
  - Rural: 100%

Administrative structure
  - Administrative divisions: 15 selsoviet
  - Inhabited localities: 25 rural localities

Municipal structure
  - Municipally incorporated as: Ileksky Municipal District
  - Municipal divisions: 0 urban settlements, 15 rural settlements
- Time zone: UTC+5 (MSK+2)
- OKTMO ID: 53619000
- Website: http://www.ilek56.net/

Ileksky District (Russian: Иле́кский райо́н; Kazakh: Елек ауданы, Elek aýdany) is an administrative and municipal district (raion), one of the thirty-five in Orenburg Oblast, Russia. It is located in the southwest of the oblast. The area of the district is 3,700 square kilometers (1,400 sq mi). Its administrative center is the rural locality (a selo) of Ilek. Population: 25,150 (2010 Census); 28,793 (2002 census); 28,533 (1989 Soviet census). The population of Ilek accounts for 38.8% of the district's total population.

== Rural Localities ==
Villages
Number	Name(English)	Name(Russian)	Population
1	Bratskiy	Братский	70
2	Dimitrovskiy	Димитровский	1128
3	Zazhivnyy	Заживный	428
4	Zatonnoye	Затонное	529
5	Ilek	Илек	10191
6	Kardailovo	Кардаилово	2280
7	Krasnyy Yar	Красный Яр	724
8	Krestovka	Крестовка	180
9	Lugovoye	Луговое	92
10	Mukhranovo	Мухраново	603=
11	Nizhneoziornoye	Нижнеозёрное	1316
12	Oziorki	Озёрки	871
13	Peschanoye	Песчаное	23
14	Podstiopki	Подстёпки	393
15	Privol'noye	Привольное	1179
16	Razdol'noye	Раздольное	221
17	Rassypnoye	Рассыпное	602
18	Sladkovo	Сладково	712
19	Stepnoye	Степное	50
20	Studionoye	Студёное	1146
21	Sukhodol'nyy	Суходольный	36
22	Sukhorechka	Сухоречка	502
23	Filippovka	Филипповка	16
24	Shutovo	Шутово	192
25	Yaman	Яман	617

== Notable people ==
- Olga I. Larkina - writer

== Paleontology ==
Fossils of temnospondyls were found in the Lower Triassic (Olenekian) deposits of Ileksky District. These extinct taxa are Parotosuchus, Rhytidosteus, Inflectosaurus, Batrachosuchoides, Wetlugasaurus, Benthosuchus and Trematotegmen.
