= Boreopricea =

Boreopricea Temporal range: Early Triassic, Olenekian

Scientific classification
- Kingdom: Animalia
- Phylum: Chordata
- Class: Reptilia
- Clade: Archosauromorpha
- Clade: Crocopoda
- Genus: †Boreopricea; Tatarinov, 1978
- Species: †B. funerea

Binomial name
- †Boreopricea funerea Tatarinov, 1978

Extinct genus of archosauromorph reptile

Boreopricea is an extinct genus of archosauromorph reptile from the Early Triassic of arctic Russia. It is known from a fairly complete skeleton discovered in a borehole on Kolguyev Island, though damage to the specimen and loss of certain bones has complicated study of the genus. Boreopricea shared many similarities with various other archosauromorphs, making its classification controversial. Various studies have considered it a close relative of Prolacerta, tanystropheids, both, or neither. Boreopricea is unique among early archosauromorphs due to possessing contact between the jugal and squamosal bones at the rear half of the skull.

== History ==
Boreopricea funerea was named and described by Soviet paleontologist L. P. Tatarinov in 1978. It was primarily based on a fairly complete skull and skeleton collected in 1972 from a borehole at Kolguyev Island in the Arctic Ocean. This holotype specimen, PIN 3708/1, included bones from most of the body, apart from the hip area, the tip of the snout, and various miscellaneous missing fragments. During Tatarinov's preparation, the bones were removed from a slab of rock and glued onto a large piece of card stock, positioned as they originally were in the rock. Tatarinov also mentioned a second specimen, PIN 3708/2, which was a portion of the snout. However, this specimen could not be found by subsequent studies and is now considered lost. The rock layers preserving Boreopricea fossils hail from the Ustmylian Gorizont, the most recent portion of the Vetlugian Supergorizont. The Ustmylian Gorizont is a regional biochronological zone which corresponds to the early Olenekian stage of the Early Triassic.

The genus was redescribed in 1997 by University of Bristol paleontologists Michael Benton and Jackie Allen. They found that the specimen had been damaged during storage, as the skull was crushed and certain bones were missing (i.e. parts of the shoulder) or placed into odd positions (i.e. the hand). A plaster cast of the skull prior to its crushing was utilized for their description of the skull, but some areas, such as the palate and braincase, eluded restudy. Further study of the specimen was undertaken as part of Martin Ezcurra's 2016 study on archosauromorph systematics.

== Description ==
Boreopricea would have had a sprawling posture and a generalized lizard-like body shape, though with a longer neck than most modern lizards. Benton & Allen (1997) estimated that Boreopricea had a total (snout tip to tail tip) length of 44.0 centimeters (17.3 inches), with a 2.9 cm (1.1 inch) skull and 23.0 cm (9.1 inch) inch tail, although these estimates are uncertain considering that the tip of the snout and large portions of the backbone are missing.

=== Skull ===
The skull had a broad snout, large orbits (eye sockets), and two temporal fenestrae (holes at the back of the skull) like other diapsid reptiles. Bones which lie at the top edge of the head, such as the nasal and frontal bones, were rectangular. The parietal bones are incomplete, but preserved portions contact the frontals along a straight edge without a parietal foramen (a hole in the skull, present in many reptiles, which houses the pineal gland). The jugal (cheek bone) was unusually shaped. It lacked a posterior process (lower rear prong), which meant that the lower temporal fenestra was open from below. Conversely, the ascending process (upper rear prong) was elongated, stretching above the lower temporal fenestra to contact the squamosal bone at the rear of the skull. This jugal-squamosal contact (unique to Boreopricea among early archosauromorphs) effectively barricades the postorbital bone from the edge of the lower temporal fenestra. The lower jaw was long and slender. Teeth, when preserved, were conical, sharply pointed, and slightly curved.

=== Postcranial skeleton ===
The neck was somewhat elongated. A sequence of five cervical (neck) vertebrae were preserved, probably the third to seventh vertebrae in the backbone. They were longer and narrower towards the skull and shorter and wider towards the shoulder. The later cervical and dorsal (torso) vertebrae had two rib facets on each side: a large, outwards-projecting facet which was triangular in cross section, and a smaller, circular facet which barely projects at all. The upwards-projecting neural spines of the vertebrae were low. Cervicals had narrow neural spines while dorsals had neural spines which gradually expanded into teardrop-shaped structures when seen from above. These expansions on the neural spines have been termed mammillary processes. The caudal (tail) vertebrae were numerous; they were broader towards the base of the tail and much thinner towards the tip.

The scapula (shoulder blade) was very thin when seen head-on but large and boxy when seen from the side. Other shoulder bones, including a bony sternum, were described by Tatarinov (1978) but are now lost. The humerus (upper arm bone) had a shape like a heavily twisted hourglass, with the long axis of the portion near the shoulder offset at a right angle from that of the portion near the elbow. The ulna and radius (lower arm bones) were thin, curved rods like those of most other reptiles. Metacarpal III (the third bone of the hand) was as long as if not longer than metacarpal IV (the fourth bone of the hand), as with tanystropheids.

Hindlimb bones are overall fairly typical in structure, although the femur (thigh bone) was broader than in most reptiles. The ankle was formed by four tightly-connected bones: the centrale, astragalus, calcaneum, and distal tarsal IV. Although the astragalus and calcaneum were the most prominent bones in the ankle, all of the ankle bones were similar in size. Boreopricea also lacked a hole along the contact between the astragalus and calcaneum and the second phalanx (toe bone) of the fifth toe was long, both traits shared by tanystropheids. Metatarsal V (the fifth bone of the foot) was hook-shaped, as with various other archosauromorphs.

== Classification ==
When first described in 1978, Boreopricea was considered to be a "prolacertiform" reptile, meaning that its closest relatives were believed to be other long-necked lizard-like creatures such as Prolacerta and Macrocnemus. At this time, it was uncertain whether "prolacertiforms" were truly ancestral to modern lizards, or alternatively closer to archosaurs such as crocodilians and dinosaurs. In the 1980s, cladistics helped to clarify some aspects of reptile classification, and analyses by Jacques Gauthier, Michael Benton, and Susan Evans found substantial evidence that "prolacertiforms" were archosauromorphs (closer to archosaurs) rather than lepidosauromorphs (closer to lizards). Some of these analyses featured or mentioned Boreopricea. Benton (1985) noted that Boreopricea was probably a prolacertid, but differed from Prolacerta due to the shape of its nasal and squamosal bones. Evans (1988) placed Boreopricea as an intermediate branch between Prolacerta, which was closer to the base of the "prolacertiform" group, and Macrocnemus, which was closer to the most derived and bizarre "prolacertiforms", the tanystropheids.

The classification of Boreopricea and "prolacertiforms" in general was given further scrutiny in 1997. Benton & Allen's redescription of the genus involved a phylogenetic analysis which found that Boreopricea was the sister taxon to Prolacerta, at least when superfluous and unstable data was cleared. Macrocnemus was not found to be close to either taxon; instead it was placed closer to the tanystropheids. Nour-Eddine Jalil performed a very similar study that year, as part of his description of the African "prolacertiform" Jesairosaurus. In contrast to Benton & Allen, Jalil's study placed Boreopricea deep within Tanystropheidae and unrelated to Prolacerta. Some traits of Boreopricea, such as a reduced posterior process of the jugal, were shared by both Prolacerta and tanystropheids. Boreopricea shared certain adaptations of the hands and feet with only tanystropheids, yet the shape of its scapula was closer to that of Prolacerta.

A landmark study by David Dilkes in 1998 found that Prolacerta was more closely related to archosauriforms rather than tanystropheids, dissolving the concept of a monophyletic "Prolacertiformes" (i.e. a group where Prolacerta and tanystropheids had a common ancestor to the exception of archosaurs). Boreopricea would not be analyzed under this new framework until 2016, when it was restudied by Martin Ezcurra. Ezcurra did not consider Boreopricea close to tanystropheids, instead he found that it was an archosauriform relative, nearly as close as Prolacerta. Some features visible in Boreopricea which justify this placement include the presence of mammillary processes and a heavily twisted humerus. Ezcurra also named a new group, Crocopoda, which includes all archosauromorphs closer to archosaurs than to tanystropheids. Boreopricea was part of this new grouping, which also included rhynchosaurs, allokotosaurs, archosauriforms, and various other archosauriform-like reptiles, such as Prolacerta.

The following cladogram is based on Ezcurra's 2016 study.

- Archosauromorpha
  - - †Aenigmastropheus
    - - †Protorosaurus
      - - †Tanystropheidae
        - Crocopoda
          - †Allokotosauria
          - - †Rhynchosauria
            - - †Boreopricea
              - - †Prolacertidae
                - - †Tasmaniosaurus
                  - Archosauriformes

A 2017 study by Adam Pritchard & Sterling Nesbitt slightly shifted the position of Boreopricea, placing it closer to allokotosaurs rather than Prolacerta and archosauriforms.

== Paleoecology ==
Ustmylian (or Ustmylskian) layers of Russian biostratigraphy record a lakeside environment filled with animals recovering and diversifying after the Permian-Triassic extinction event, the greatest mass extinction in the history of the earth. The most common fossils at this time and place were freshwater amphibians such as Wetlugasaurus malachovi, Vladlenosaurus alexeyevi, Vyborosaurus mirus, and Angusaurus. On land, the small omnivore niche was filled by a diverse assortment of endemic procolophonids, including Timanophon raridentatus, Orenburgia bruma, and Lestanshoria massiva. The large predator niche was probably filled by early archosauriforms such as Chasmatosuchus magnus and Tsylmosuchus jakovlevi. These layers also preserved fossils of Scharschengia, which may be one of the earliest rhynchocephalians (tuatara relatives). Boreopricea funerea probably filled a small carnivore niche alongside mammal-like therocephalians as well as Microcnemus efremovi, a reptile which was similar to and probably closely related to it.
