= Scolotosuchus =

Scolotosuchus Temporal range: Early Triassic Olenekian

Scientific classification
- Kingdom: Animalia
- Phylum: Chordata
- Class: Reptilia
- Clade: Pseudosuchia
- Family: †Rauisuchidae
- Genus: †Scolotosuchus; Sennikov, 2023

Type species
- Scolotosuchus basileus Sennikov, 2023

Extinct genus of rauisuchid

Scolotosuchus is an extinct genus of rauisuchid from the Early Triassic of Russia. The only known species, Scolotosuchus basileus, has been discovered at the Donskaya Luka Locality. It differs from all other rauisuchids in the morphology of its spine, which allowed it to both resist great stress and gave it a great range of mobility. Additionally, it may have lacked osteoderms, with its spine instead being supported in a similar manner as in dinosaurs. At 3 m (9.8 ft) it was likely the apex predator of its ecosystem.

== History and naming ==
In 1999 several isolated fossil remains of a large rauisuchid were described from the Donskaya Luka Locality within the Lipovskaya Formation, located in the Central Russian Upland. The taxon this material was attributed to was named Scythosuchus basileus by paleontologist Andrey Gerasimovich Sennikov, who at the time thought it was a large but short-necked rauisuchid. Later research conducted by Sennikov however called the validity of Scythosuchus into question, as the holotype specimen, a poorly preserved neck vertebrae, was found to be similar to the fossils of the poposauroid Tsylmosuchus. This resulted in Scythosuchus being considered a junior synonym of Tsylmosuchus. However while the holotype itself was found to lack distinguishing traits, the type series of Scythosuchus also included a series of thoracic vertebrae notable for their short spinous processes and rugose dorsal ends. These vertebrae had previously been used to diagnose Scythosuchus and clearly belonged to a distinct type of early pseudosuchian unrelated to Tsylmosuchus. The discovery of additional vertebrae of similar morphology supported the idea that a large rauisuchid was present at Donskaya Luka, eventually leading Sennikov to establish the new genus Scolotosuchus, this time with the thoracic vertebrae serving as the holotype specimen. In addition to vertebrae, a partial pelvis, hindlimbs and a calcaneum are also assigned to this new genus.

The name Scolotosuchus is derived from the "Skolotoi", the native name of the Scythians that once inhabited the region the fossils were found in. This mirrors the name of Scythosuchus, the taxon that the type material was once assigned to. The suffix "suchus" meanwhile derives from the Greek soukhos meaning crocodile, a common element in the names of prehistoric pseudosuchians. The species name "basileus" also derives from Greek and means king. It was chosen in part due to the fact that it had previously been the species name of Scythosuchus, but also do reference the royal Scythians that lived north of the Sea of Azov.

== Description ==
Scolotosuchus is known for the peculiar morphology of its vertebrae which is highly variable along the spinal column. The neck and early thoracic vertebrae are characterized by their short and low spinous processes, with the neural spine being of approximately equal height and length. Another feature present in both the later neck vertebrae as well as the early thoracic vertebrae are the well developed rugosities on the ends of their spinous processes. These are considered to be hypertrophied apophyseal ossifications by Sennikov, rather than the result of osteoderms fusing with the vertebrae. Sennikov also notes that the frequent discovery of isolated neural arches may indicate that the suture between the neural arch and the centra of the vertebrae are only weakly fused or not fused at all even in adult individuals. This would cause the vertebrae to effectively fall apart once the muscles begin to rot and the body decomposes or gets buried. The anterior articular processes (prezygapophysis) are notably wider than the posterior articular processes (postzygapophysis) in the neck and first thoracic vertebrae, but more similar size in the following trunk vertebrae. The later neck vertebrae, around the 7th or 8th, have high and narrow neural canals formed by the fact that the neural arches are composed of long legs and relatively short spinous processes. Both the hyposphene and the hypantrum, located at the back and front of each vertebra respectively, are well developed and the hypantrum in particular is accompanied by accessory laminae and depressions in the bone. The middle vertebrae of the neck show a neural spine that is bifurcated, giving it a Y-shape. This well defined bifurcation is another trait that is unique to Scolotosuchus among rauisuchids, as any other members of this family with bifurcated neural spines have this feature only weakly developed. This applies to both Batrachotomus and Stagonosuchus (which are considered rauisuchids by Sennikov), in which the bifurcation is additionally restricted to only the front of the neural spine. Sennikov also mentions Mandasuchus as the only rauisuchid with a fully bifurcated neural spine besides Scolotosuchus, however other authors such as Sterling J. Nesbitt do not regard these taxa to be rauisuchids at all.

The preacetabular process of the illium is short and projects slightly cranially, the fact that this process is only poorly developed is seen in no other rauisuchid other than Ticinosuchus from the Middle Triassic of Europe. The subvertical crest is only sloping slightly, which sets Scolotosuchus apart from the American Postosuchus. The dorsal blade is low and the upper margin almost straight, both features typical for rauisuchids and clearly aligning Scolotosuchus with this group rather than with the contemporary ctenosauriscid Bystrowisuchus, which possessed a saddle-shaped dorsal blade. The ischium likewise falls within the typical rauisuchid anatomy, with a wide proximal end that connects to the illium and a narrow distal end. The femur is sigmoid in shape and elongated with a slightly compressed shaft and moderately wide ends, again generally resembling what is expected of a rauisuchid. The tibia and a fragmentary fibula are both described as being massive, with the former also being elongated and having a rounded proximal and oval distal ending to it.

The calcaneum matches the crocodiloid-type ankle joint with a short tuber. The region where the calcaneum articulares with the astragalus is however convex, bearing slight resemblance to members of the Euparkeriidae, but otherwise shows no depressions or projections.

Sennikov estimates that Scolotosuchus may have reached a length of approximately 3 m (9.8 ft).

== Paleoecology ==
Sennikov points out that bifurcated neural spines are typically associated with the development of strong epaxial musculature and ligament, either in order to support a heavy head, a long neck or animals in which the neck and head are moved with great flexion or at great speeds. As Scolotosuchus shows no signs of having possessed an elongated neck, it is considered much more likely that it was the size and weight of the head that may have led to the evolution of bifurcated neural spines. However, since this does not appear to be the case in most other rauisuchids or other predatory loricatans, Sennikov additionally proposes that Scolotosuchus may have differed from its relatives through the specific methods it used to capture and kill prey. It is suggested that it may have moved its head rapidly and jerked heavy prey around. The rugose ends of the spine towards the back of the neck and at the front of the torso are also indicative of strong ligament attachments.

The proportions of the prezygapophyses compared to the postzygapophyses further indicate that in addition to being able to sustain great loads, the neck was very mobile. This is expected for the first thoracic vertebrae, where Scolotosuchus had the greatest range of mobility, especially side to side, but is more unusual for the central neck vertebrae. These vertebrae, despite being short-bodied, had a great range of motion both up and down and sideways. Towards the back of the neck the mobility is decreased slightly and after the transition between neck and torso the vertebrae show a more expected range of motion. This and the presence of infrahypantrum laminae indicates that the back of the neck and front of the torso endured the greatest loads. The combination of great flexibility with strong forces then likely led to the development of the well developed hyposphene-hypantrum articulation in order to stabilize the spine.

Finally, Sennikov draws parallels between the rugose expansion of the neural spine seen in Scolotosuchus and those seen in poposauroids, which are likely to have lost their osteoderms and instead evolved a support system more similar to that of dinosaurs. Modern crocodiles and many extinct pseudosuchians, rauisuchids included, use their osteoderms in combination with musculature and ligaments to create a "beam bridge" that allows them to lift their bodies off the ground for an erect or partially erect gait. Mammals, dinosaurs and possibly poposauroids meanwhile use a "suspension bridge"-like system formed by ligaments and musculature that hold up the spine from the elongated spinal processes around the shoulder region. While Sennikov does not exclude the possibility that Scolotosuchus did have osteoderms in addition to the rugose neural spine expansions, he notes that no such fossils have been found anywhere at Donskaya Luka.

In summary, Scolotosuchus was likely the apex predator of its environment, likely having had a large head seated atop a neck built to endure great stress both while resting and while capturing prey while also being very flexible. It likely had an erect gait similar to other rauisuchids, possibly supported by musculature and ligament more similar to those of dinosaurs than those of other pseudosuchians.

== Paleoenvironment ==
At Donskaya Luka Scolotosuchus would have coexisted with a variety of other pseudosuchians and archosaurs, including the small poposauroid Tsylmosuchus, the large ctenosauriscid Bystrowisuchus and even the potential erythrosuchid Garjainia. Other animals include the dicynodont Putillosaurus, the tanystropheid Augustaburiania, the pistosaurid Tanaisosaurus, multiple trilophosaurids such as Coelodontognathus as well as a great variety of labyrinthodonts. Notably, the fauna of this region differs greatly from areas in the north and southeast, possibly explained by the presence of large sea bays. This would explain why influence from Gondwana (through erythrosuchids) or Central Europe (in the form of rauisuchids, tanystrophids and ctenosauriscids) can be observed in the southern Urals but not to the north.
