= Borsky District, Samara Oblast =

Borsky District Борский район (Russian)
- District
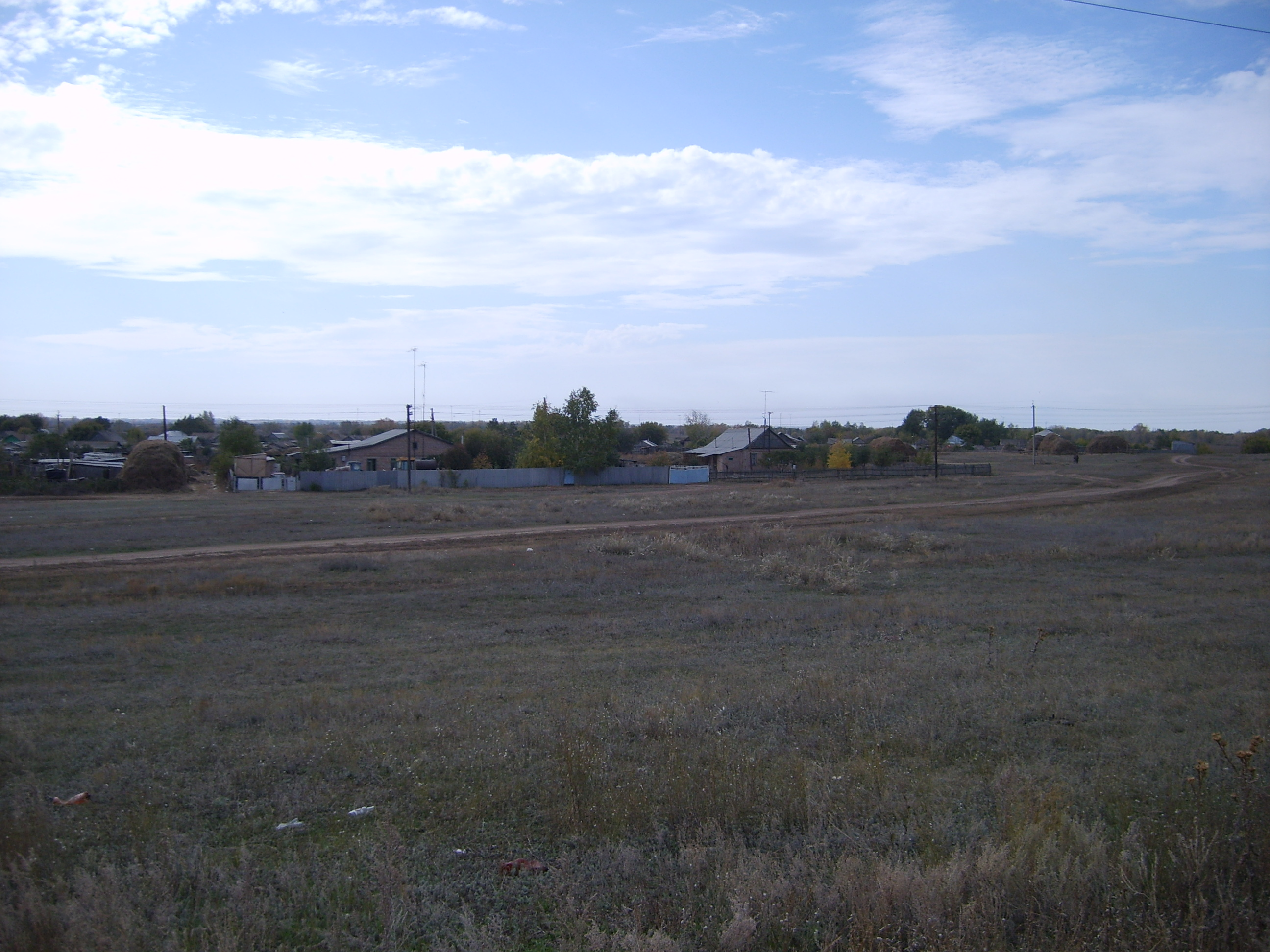
- Landscape in Borsky District

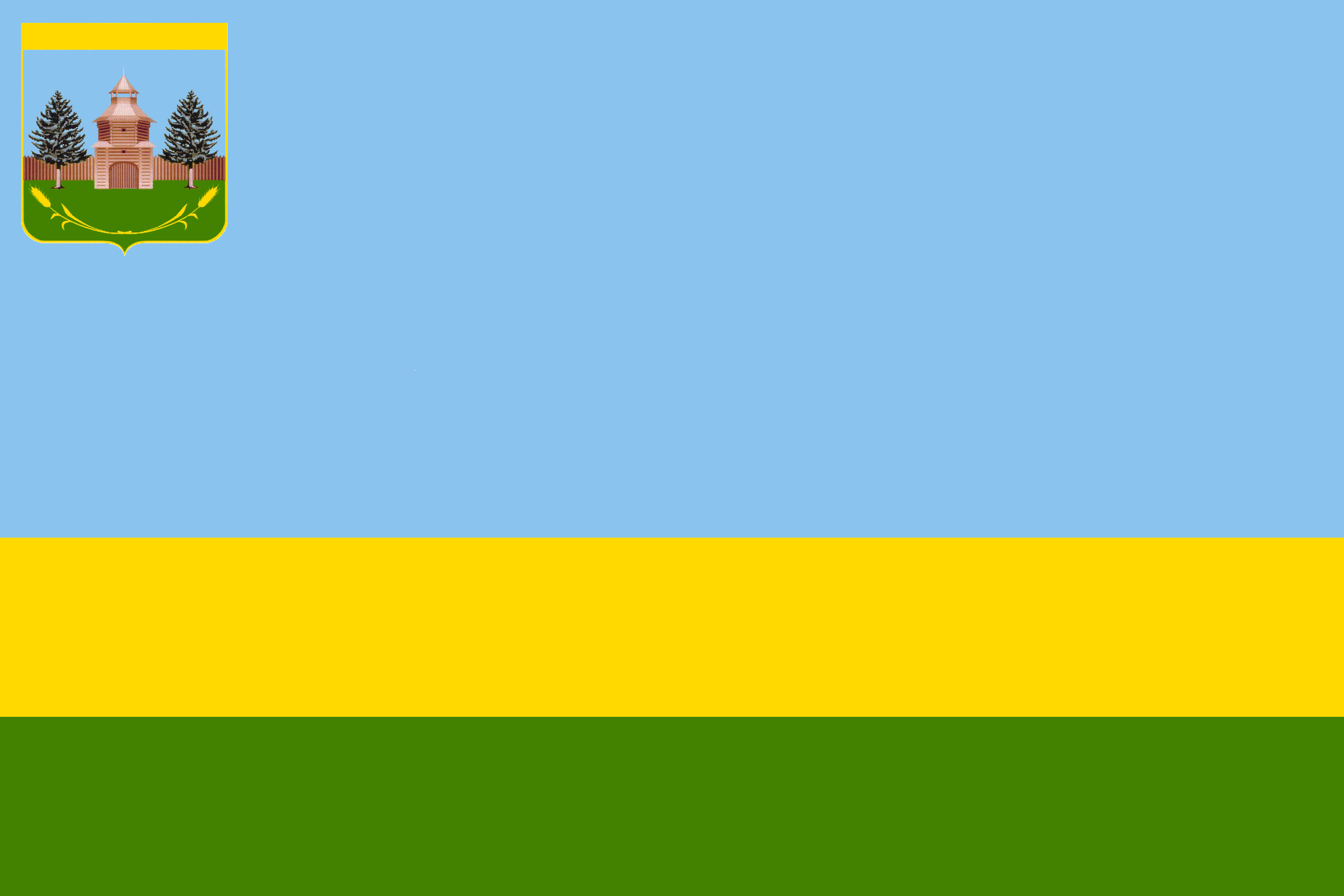
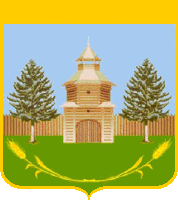
- Flag Coat of arms
- Location of Borsky District in Samara Oblast
- Coordinates: 53°02′17″N 51°42′22″E
- Country: Russia
- Federal subject: Samara Oblast
- Established: 16 July 1928
- Administrative center: Borskoye

Area
  - Total: 2,103 km^{2} (812 sq mi)

Population (2010 Census)
  - Total: 24,433
  - Density: 11.62/km^{2} (30.09/sq mi)
  - Urban: 0%
  - Rural: 100%

Administrative structure
  - Inhabited localities: 51 rural localities

Municipal structure
  - Municipally incorporated as: Borsky Municipal District
  - Municipal divisions: 0 urban settlements, 13 rural settlements
- Time zone: UTC+4 (MSK+1)
- OKTMO ID: 36612000
- Website: https://adm-borraion.ru/

Borsky District (Russian: Бо́рский райо́н) is an administrative and municipal district (raion), one of the twenty-seven in Samara Oblast, Russia. It is located in the east of the oblast. The area of the district is 2,103 square kilometers (812 sq mi). Its administrative center is the rural locality (a selo) of Borskoye. Population: 24,433 (2010 Census); 24,743 (2002 census); 25,294 (1989 Soviet census). The population of Borskoye accounts for 36.6% of the district's total population.

== Paleontology ==
In the Lower Triassic of Borsky District remains of temnospondyls were found. These fossil taxa are Samarabatrachus, Syrtosuchus, Qantas, Dromotectum, Benthosuchus, Tupilakosaurus, Selenocara, Angusaurus and Wetlugasaurus. Other specimens possibly belong to Axitectum and Thoosuchus, also from the Early Triassic.
