= Borskoye =

Borskoye (Russian: Бо́рское) is the name of several rural localities in Russia:

- Borskoye, Kaliningrad Oblast, a settlement in Slavinsky Rural Okrug of Gvardeysky District of Kaliningrad Oblast
- Borskoye, Samara Oblast, a selo in Borsky District of Samara Oblast

== See also ==
- Borsky (disambiguation)
