= Rybinskian Gorizont =

Geologic formation in Russia

The Rybinskian Gorizont ("Rybinskian Horizon") is a Lower Triassic biostratigraphic unit in Western Russia. It is a part of the Vetlugian Supergorizont and corresponds to the earliest part of the Olenekian stage, lying above the late Induan-age Zaplavnian Horizon and below the Sludkian Gorizont. The Rybinskian Gorizont is sometimes known as the Benthosuchus fauna, due to abundant fossils of Benthosuchus, a temnospondyl amphibian index fossil. Related amphibians such as Thoosuchus also increase in abundance, and the interval additionally hosts the oldest fossils of procolophonines and putative true archosaurs in the region.

The Rybinskian is exposed in several svitas (equivalent to geological formations) spread out over a wide area: the type assemblage is the Rybinskaya Svita in the Moscow Syncline, and another is the Staritskya Svita in the Southern Urals area.
