= Doniceps =

Doniceps Temporal range: Early Triassic, Olenekian

Scientific classification
- Domain: Eukaryota
- Kingdom: Animalia
- Phylum: Chordata
- Class: Reptilia
- Clade: Archosauromorpha
- Clade: †Allokotosauria
- Order: †Trilophosauria
- Family: †Trilophosauridae
- Genus: †Doniceps; Otschev & Rykov, 1968

Type species
- †Doniceps lipovensis Otschev & Rykov, 1968

Extinct genus of reptiles

Doniceps is an extinct genus of reptile from the Early Triassic (late Olenekian stage) of European Russia known from the type species D. lipovensis. It was solely known from the holotype premaxilla 104/3106 housed at Saratov University, however the specimen is probably lost. It was collected at the Donskaya Luka Locality near the village of Sirotinskaya in Ilovlinsky District, Volgograd Oblast, from the Lipovskaya Formation of the Gamskii Horizon. The generic name refers to the nearby Don River added the Greek suffix for "head", -ceps. The specific name is derived from the name of the type locality Donskaya Luka, also known as Lipovaya Balka. Named by Otschev and Rykov in 1968 as an archosauromorph, Arkhangelskii & Sennikov (2008) classified the taxon as a possible trilophosaurid. Doniceps is thought to be similar to Coelodontognathus and Vitalia, both of which are known exclusively from the same locality and were first identified as procolophonids but later reclassified as trilophosaurids.
