= Yarenga =

Yarenga Russian: Яренга
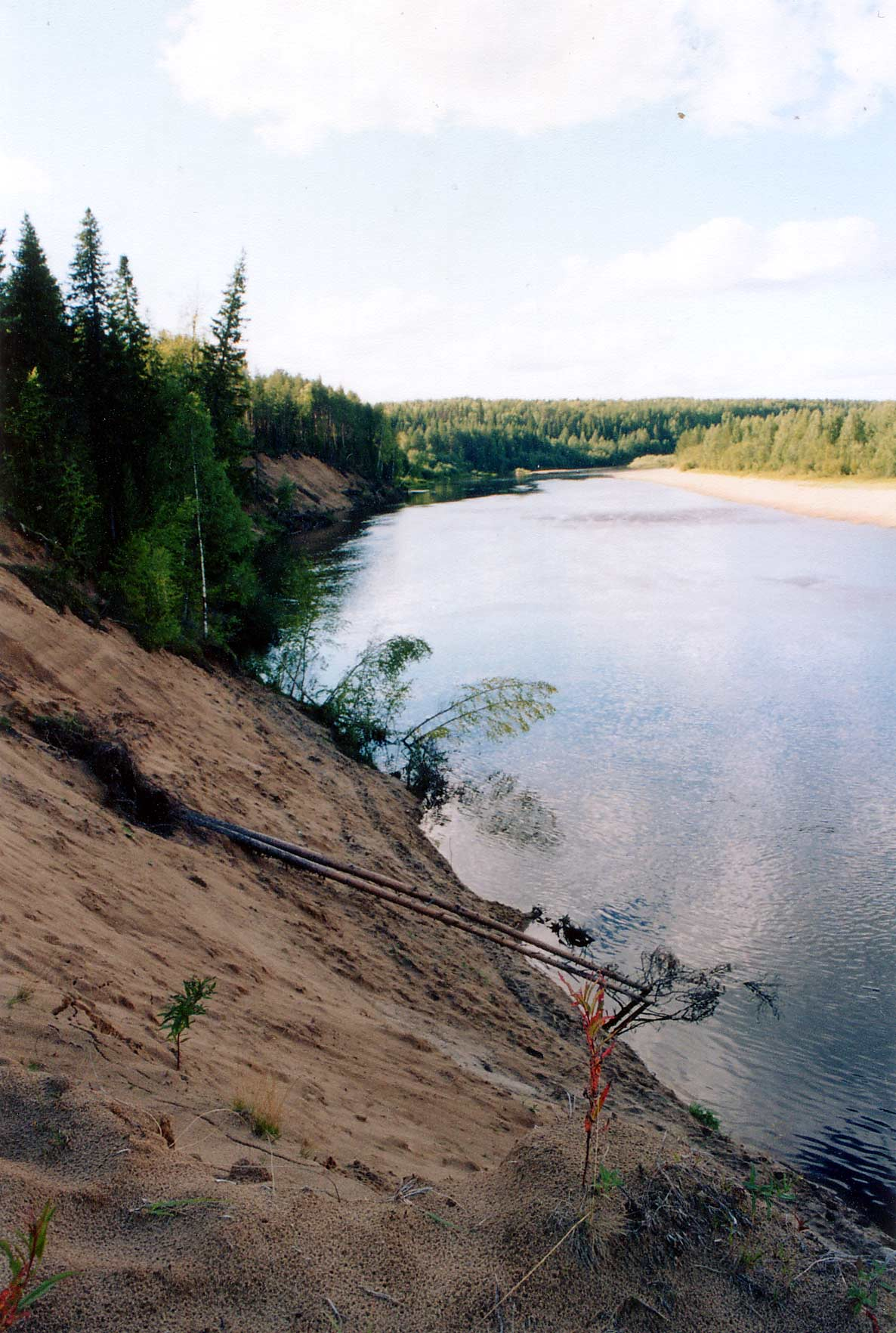

Location
- Country: Russia

Physical characteristics
- Mouth: Vychegda
  - coordinates: 62°07′47″N 49°04′29″E
- Length: 281 km (175 mi)
- Basin size: 5,140 square kilometres (1,980 mi^{2})
- Discharge
  - average: 48.8 cubic metres per second (1,720 cu ft/s)

Basin features
- Progression: Vychegda→ Northern Dvina→ White Sea

The Northern Dvina basin. The Yarenga is shown.

The Yarenga (Russian: Яренга) is a river in the Ust-Vymsky District of the Komi Republic and in the Lensky District of the Arkhangelsk Oblast in Russia. It is a right tributary of the Vychegda. The river is 281 kilometres (175 mi) long, and its drainage basin covers 5,140 square kilometres (1,980 sq mi). The principal tributaries are the Vezhay (left) and Uktym (right). The Yarenga is the most significant river in the Lensky District north of the Vychegda, and collects almost all of the drainage in that area.

The source of the Yarenga is near the village of Vezhayka in the Komi Republic. The Yarenga flows to the north-west through primeval pine and larch forests, enters the Arkhangelsk Oblast, and in the village of Yarenga turns south-west. It is noted for its many rapids. In the village of Ust-Ocheya, where it accepts the Ocheya from the left, it turns south-east. Yarensk is on the left bank, approximately 3 kilometres (2 mi) from the river course. The Yarenga empties into the Vychegda about 5 kilometres (3 mi) downstream from Yarensk.

== Paleontology ==
Fossils ot temnospondyl amphibians Parotosuchus komiensis, Yarengia perplexa, Batrachosuchoides ochevi and Melanopelta antiqua were found in the Lower Triassic (Upper Olenekian) deposits, near this river.
