= Ilek, Orenburg Oblast =

Rural locality in Orenburg Oblast, Russia

Ilek Илек
- Interactive map of Ilek
- Location of Ilek
- Coordinates: 51°31′30″N 53°22′50″E
- Country: Russia
- Federal subject: Orenburg Oblast
- Founded: 1737

Area
  - Total: 6.5 km^{2} (2.5 sq mi)

Population (2010 Census)
  - Total: 9,760
  - Estimate (2021): 10,191 (+4.4%)
  - Density: 1,500/km^{2} (3,900/sq mi)
- Time zone: UTC+5 (MSK+2)
- OKTMO ID: 53619407101

Ilek (Russian: Илек) is a rural locality (a selo) and the administrative center of Ileksky District, Orenburg Oblast, Russia. Population: 10.191 (2021 census); 9,760 (2010 census); 9,953 (2002 census); 9,679 (1989 Soviet census).

== Geography ==
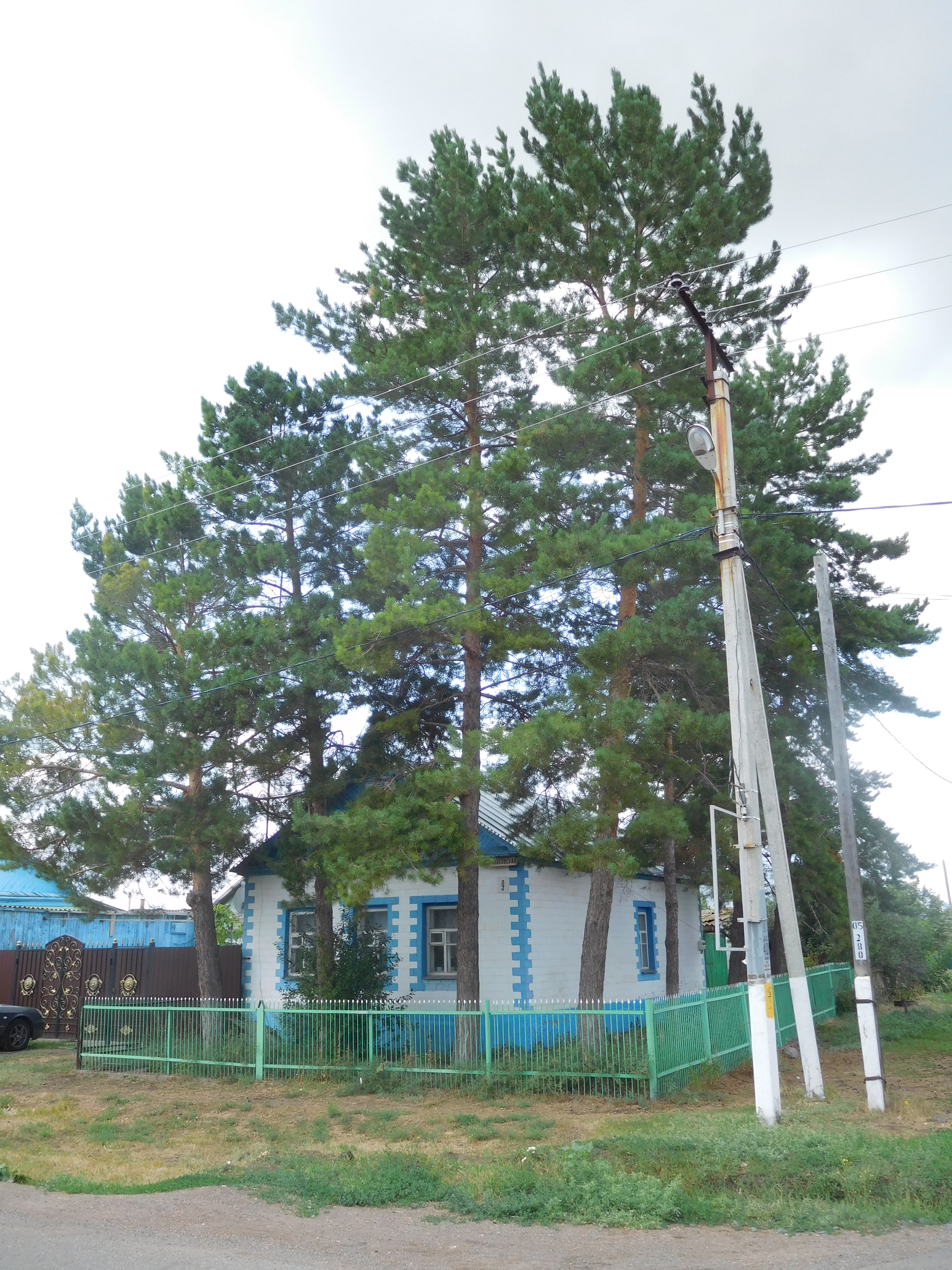

It is located 128 km west of Orenburg, in the steppe zone at the confluence of the Ilek River and the Ural River.

The climate is sharply continental with hot summers and cold winters. The valley of the Ural River in the vicinity of Ilek is formed by deciduous forests with picturesque lakes and oxbow lakes, attracting lovers of tourism and fishing. Near the Urals there are extensive floodplain meadows and suitable land for arable farming.

The pearl of the village is the sandy beaches on the low left bank of the bend of the Ural River, the width of which in the Ilek area is 50-70 meters, the depth is up to 3 meters, with the presence of a stormy rapids along the high and wooded right bank. The nearest railway station is located 70 km north in the village Novosergiyevka

Approximately 3 km from the village there is a Russian checkpoint across the border into the Republic of Kazakhstan. The village itself is not included in the border zone; in Soviet times, the border with Kazakhstan, now a state border, was moved several kilometers deep into the right bank of the Ural River. The area of the village is about 35 km².
