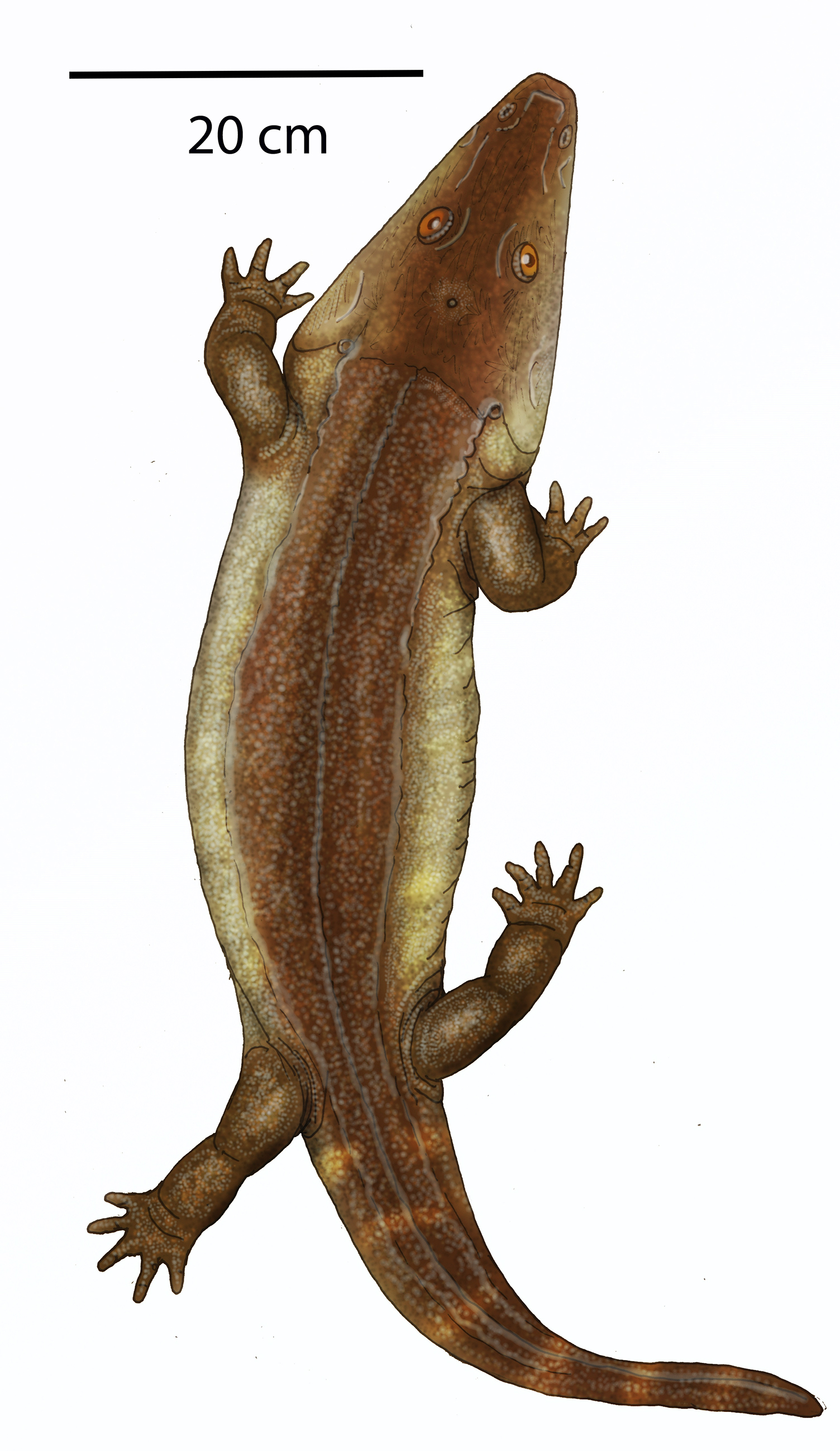

Scientific classification
- Kingdom: Animalia
- Phylum: Chordata
- Clade: Tetrapoda
- Order: †Temnospondyli
- Suborder: †Stereospondyli
- Family: †Lydekkerinidae (?)
- Genus: †Luzocephalus; Säve-Söderbergh, 1935

Species
- L. blomi Shishkin, 1980; L. johannsoni Säve-Söderbergh, 1935; L. kochi Säve-Söderbergh, 1935

= Luzocephalus =

Luzocephalus Temporal range: Early Triassic

Extinct genus of temnospondyls

Luzocephalus is an extinct genus of temnospondyl from the Early Triassic of Russia (Vetluga Series, Kasnyye Baki horizon) and Greenland (Wordie Creek Formation). It is usually regarded as a member of the family Lydekkerinidae, although it has also been placed in the family Trematosauridae.

== Phylogeny ==
Luzocephalus in a cladogram after Novikov (2018) with only Early Triassic Eastern Europe taxa included:

- Temnospondyli
  - Luzocephalus
  - - Capitosauridae
      - - Samarabatrachus
        - - Parotosuchus
          - Poryolosuchus
      - - Selenocara
        - - Wetlugasaurus
          - Vladlenosaurus
    - - Quantas
      - - - Syrtosuchus
          - - Benthosuchus
            - - Yarengiidae
                - Vyborosaurus
                - Yarengia
        - Trematosauridae
          - Prothoosuchus
          - - Thoosuchus
            - - Trematotegmen
              - - Angusaurus
                - - Inflectosaurus
                  - Trematosaurus
