= Yarengia =

Yarengia Temporal range: Triassic, 251.3–247.2 Ma

Scientific classification
- Kingdom: Animalia
- Phylum: Chordata
- Clade: Tetrapoda
- Order: †Temnospondyli
- Suborder: †Stereospondyli
- Clade: †Capitosauria
- Superfamily: †Mastodonsauroidea
- Genus: †Yarengia; Shishkin, 1960

Type species
- Yarengia perplexa Shishkin, 1960

Extinct genus of amphibians

Yarengia is an extinct genus of temnospondyl amphibian in the superfamily Mastodonsauroidea. It is known from Yarenga River, representing the Triassic of Russia.

== Phylogeny ==
Yarengia in a cladogram after Novikov (2018) with only Early Triassic Eastern Europe taxa included:

- Temnospondyli
  - Luzocephalus
  - - Capitosauridae
      - - Samarabatrachus
        - - Poryolosuchus
          - Parotosuchus
      - - Selenocara
        - - Wetlugasaurus
          - Vladlenosaurus
    - - Qantas
      - - Trematosauridae
          - Prothoosuchus
          - - Thoosuchus
            - - Trematotegmen
              - - Angusaurus
                - - Inflectosaurus
                  - Trematosaurus
        - - Syrtosuchus
          - - Benthosuchus
            - - Yarengiidae
                - Vyborosaurus
                - Yarengia

== See also ==
- Prehistoric amphibian
- List of prehistoric amphibians
