= Vitalia =

Vitalia Temporal range: Early Triassic, Olenekian

Scientific classification
- Domain: Eukaryota
- Kingdom: Animalia
- Phylum: Chordata
- Class: Reptilia
- Clade: Archosauromorpha
- Clade: †Allokotosauria
- Order: †Trilophosauria (?)
- Family: †Trilophosauridae (?)
- Genus: †Vitalia; Ivakhnenko, 1973

Type species
- †Vitalia grata Ivakhnenko, 1973

Extinct genus of reptiles

Vitalia is an extinct genus of reptile from the Early Triassic (late Olenekian stage) of European Russia known from the type species V. grata. It is known from the holotype dentary PIN 4173/126 (SGU 104/3105) as well as two additional dentaries PIN 1043/627 and 1043/628, all housed at the Paleontological Institute, Russian Academy of Sciences. The type dentary was originally included in the hypodigm of Coelodontognathus donensis named by the notable Russian vertebrate paleontologist Vitaliy Georgiyevich Ochev in 1967. Ivakhnenko (1973) separated the specimen and gave it its own genus and species name in light of the new material, which he named in honor of Ochev. The dentaries of Vitalia were collected at the Donskaya Luka Locality near the village of Sirotinskaya in Ilovlinsky District, Volgograd Oblast, from the Lipovskaya Formation of the Gamskii Horizon. Like Coelodontognathus, Vitalia was originally described as a procolophonid parareptile in 1973, but Arkhangelskii & Sennikov (2008) reclassified the taxon as a possible trilophosaurid archosauromorph. Vitalia is thought to be similar to the possible trilophosaurids Coelodontognathus and Doniceps, both of which are known exclusively from the same locality. Coelodontognathus and Vitalia are similar to procolophonids in that they have wide teeth but differs from them in that they have tooth roots set deep into the jaws.
