= Sludkian Gorizont =

Geologic formation in Russia

The Sludkian Gorizont ("Sludkian Horizon") is a Lower Triassic biostratigraphic unit in Western Russia. The Sludkian Gorizont is a part of the Vetlugian Supergorizont and corresponds to the middle part of the early Olenekian stage, lying above the Rybinskian Gorizont and below the Ustmylian Gorizont. The Sludkian and Ustmylian Gorizonts are together encompassed by the "Wetlugasaurus fauna", named after a capitosaur amphibian index fossil. The Sludkian is characterized by Wetlugasaurus angustifrons, while the Ustmylian is characterized by Wetlugasaurus malachovi.

The Sludkian is exposed in several svitas (equivalent to geological formations) spread out over a wide area: the main assemblage is the Sludkinskaya Svita in the Moscow Syncline, and another is the Kzylsaiskaya Svita of the Ural-Samara Basin.
