= Mordovsky =

Mordovsky (masculine), Mordovskaya (feminine), or Mordovskoye (neuter) may refer to:

- something related to the Mordvins, an ethnic group living mainly in Russia
- Mordovsky District, a district of Tambov Oblast, Russia
- Mordovsky (inhabited locality) (Mordovskaya, Mordovskoye), several rural localities in Russia
