= Borski =

Borski is a surname. Notable persons with the surname include:

- Gerard van Wieringhen Borski (1800–1869), Dutch educator
- Johanna Borski (1764–1846), Dutch banker
- Marcin Borski (born 1973), Polish football referee
- Robert A. Borski Jr. (born 1948), American politician

== See also ==
- Borsky
