= Ustmylian Gorizont =

Geologic formation in Russia

The Ustmylian Gorizont ("Ustmylian Horizon") is a Lower Triassic biostratigraphic unit in Western Russia. The Ustmylian Gorizont is the youngest subunit of the Vetlugian Supergorizont, lying above the Sludkian Gorizont and below the Yarenskian Gorizont. It corresponds to the later part of the early Olenekian stage. Along with the Sludkian Gorizont, the Ustmylian Gorizont is encompassed by the "Wetlugasaurus fauna", named after a capitosaur amphibian index fossil. While the Sludkian is characterized by Wetlugasaurus angustifrons, the Ustmylian is characterized by Wetlugasaurus malachovi.

The Ustmylian is exposed in several svitas (equivalent to geological formations) spread out over a wide area. These include the upper part of the Charkabozhskaya Svita (Charkabozh Formation) in the Pechora Basin, the Bereznikovskaya Svita in the Moscow Syncline, the Pizhmomezen'skaya Svita near the Mezen River, and the Gostevskaya Svita near the Samara River. Differentiating the Sludkian and Ustmylian can be difficult elsewhere.
