= Borsky =

Borsky (masculine), Borskaya (feminine), or Borskoye (neuter) is a surname. Notable persons with that name include:

- Alexandre Borsky, pseudonym of Joe D'Amato (1936–1999) and Claudio Bernabei, Italian filmmaker
- Rex Borsky, pseudonym of Alex de Renzy, American director and producer
- Peer Borsky (born 1990), Swiss épée fencer
- Vladimír Borský (1904–1962), Czech film actor, screenwriter and film director

== See also ==
- Borskoye, several rural localities in Russia
- Borski
