= Melanopelta =

Melanopelta Temporal range: Triassic, 251.3–247.2 Ma

Scientific classification
- Kingdom: Animalia
- Phylum: Chordata
- Clade: Tetrapoda
- Order: †Temnospondyli
- Suborder: †Stereospondyli
- Family: †Plagiosauridae
- Genus: †Melanopelta; Shishkin, 1967

Type species
- †Melanopelta antiqua Shishkin, 1967

Extinct genus of amphibians

Melanopelta is an extinct genus of Triassic temnospondyl amphibians known from the Yarenga River, Russia.

== See also ==
- Prehistoric amphibian
- List of prehistoric amphibians
