= Olga I. Larkina =

Russian journalist, publicist and writer

Olga Ivanovna Larkina
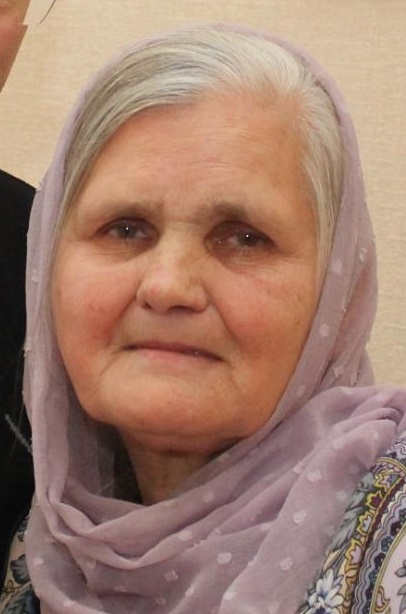
- Olga Ivanovna Larkina
- Born: July 31, 1954; Rassypnaya village, Ileksky District, Orenburg Oblast, Russia)
- Occupation: Novelist • journalist

Olga I. Larkina (Russian: Ольга И. Ларькина) (b. July 31, 1954, Rassypnaya village, Ileksky District, Orenburg Oblast, Russia) – Russian journalist, publicist and writer.

== Short biography ==
In 1971, she graduated from Sakmara Secondary School and in 1980 – Samara State Social and Pedagogical University (former Kuibyshev State Pedagogical Institute named after V.V. Kuybyshev) with honors. She worked in district and large-circulation newspapers in Samara, including the editorial board of the regional newspaper Volzhskaya nov and the newspaper Zavodskaya zhizn of the Progress Rocket Space Centre and as a newscaster at the Center's Radio. Since 1996 she has been a journalist of the Samara Orthodox newspaper Blagovest, since 1998 – Deputy Editor of the Blagovest newspaper and the Lampada magazine. She is a member of the Union of Journalists of Russia.

== Creativity ==
She writes essays, short stories, and novels. She is the author of several publicistic ("When you were a point in me ... daughter", "Bloody book. Sin of abortion in Russia", "Desired Pier") and fiction books for children ("Pandora's Box, or Missing Children", "Amazing Adventures of Dimka Golubev ","When the spiral locks", etc.). The ideas of faith, goodness, and justice are embodied in them in an art form.

== Awards and honours ==
- Medal of St. Sergius of Radonezh II degree (Patriarchal Award) (2004)
- Silver badge of St. Alexis (award of the Samara diocese) (2014)
- First prize of the 1st International Festival of Social Technologies in Defense of Family Values "FOR LIFE-2010", Moscow.
- Diploma of the Holy Great Martyr Grand Duchess Elizabeth Feodorovna for the love for the Bulgarian people and mercy (Bulgaria, 2019)

== Family ==
- Five children, eight grandchildren

== Main publications ==
- Когда ты была во мне точкой... дочка (When you were a point in me... daughter). Samara: Blagovest, 2000
- Кровавая книга. Грех аборта в России (Bloody book. The sin of abortion in Russia). Samara: Blagovest, 2001
- Удивительные приключения Димки Голубева, которые помогли ему стать человеком (The amazing adventures of Dimka Golubev, which helped him become a man). Ryazan: Grains of the Word, 2011 ISBN 9785903138753.
- Ящик Пандоры, или Пропавшие дети (Pandora's Box, or Missing Children). Ryazan: Grains of the Word, 2014.
- Ящик Пандоры, или Пропавшие дети. Кольцо королевы Горделии (Pandora's Box, or Missing Children. Ring of Queen Hordelia). Ryazan: Grains of the Word, 2014.
- Желанная пристань. Непридуманные истории (Desired Pier. Real stories). M.: Novaya Misl, 2016 ISBN 978-5-902716-42-6.
- Ящик Пандоры, или Пропавшие дети. Дымка (Pandora's Box, or Missing Children. Dimka). M.: Siberian Blagozvonnitsa, 2017 ISBN 978-5-906911-31-5.
- Когда замкнется спираль. (When the spiral locks). M .: Siberian Blagozvonnitsa, 2020.

== See also ==
- Books by Olga Larkina on Ozon
- A detailed list of publications by Olga Larkina in the newspaper Blagovest
