= Buzuluk, Orenburg Oblast =

Town in Orenburg Oblast, Russia

Buzuluk Бузулук
- Town
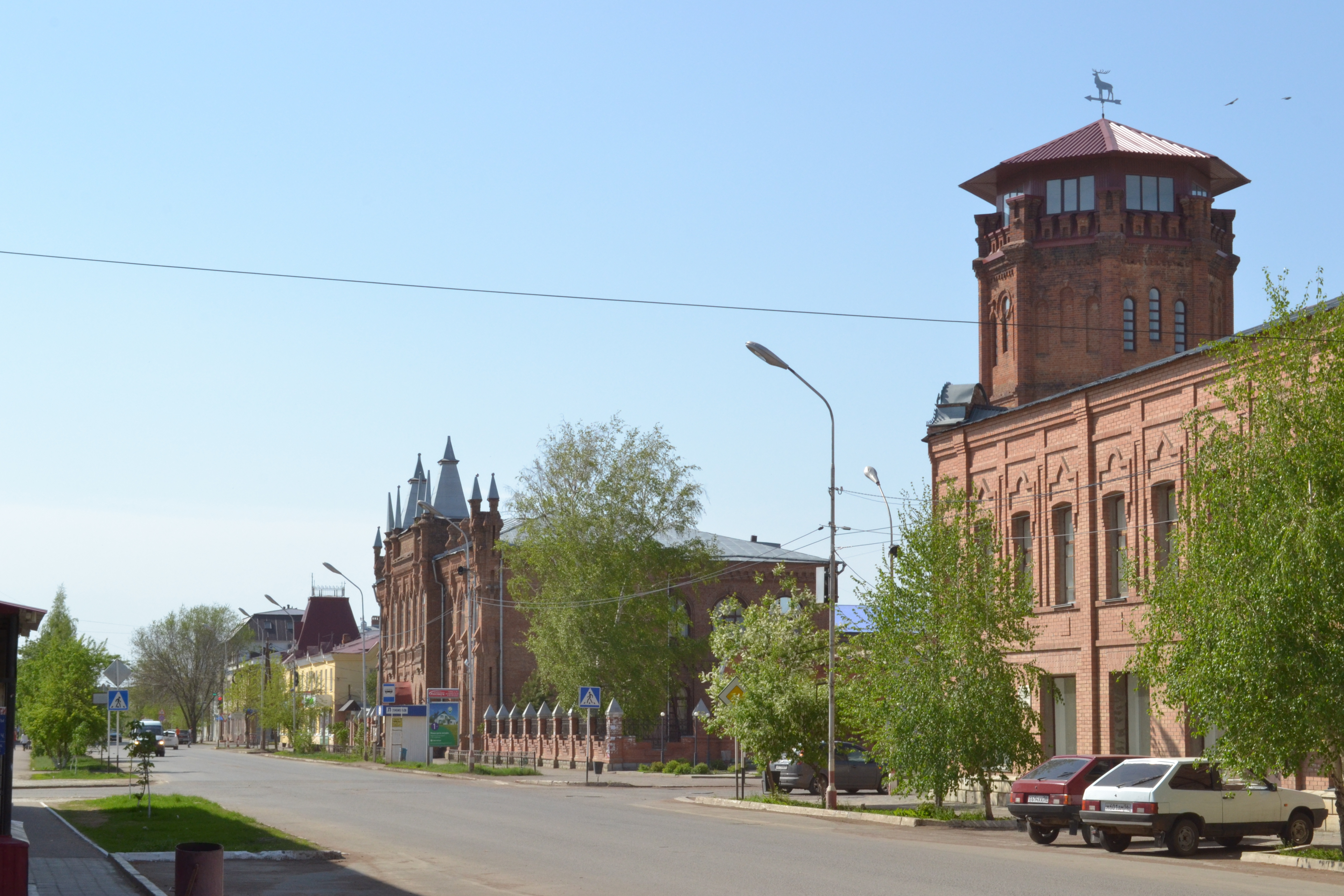

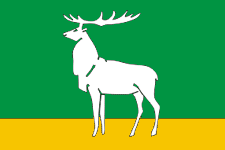
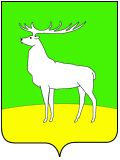
- Flag Coat of arms
- Interactive map of Buzuluk
- Location of Buzuluk Buzuluk (European Russia) Buzuluk (Russia)
- Coordinates: 52°47′N 52°15′E
- Country: Russia
- Federal subject: Orenburg Oblast
- Founded: 1736
- Town status since: 1781
- Elevation: 70 m (230 ft)

Population (2010 Census)
  - Total: 82,904
  - Estimate (2025): 88,202 (+6.4%)
  - Rank: 199th in 2010

Administrative status
  - Subordinated to: Town of Buzuluk
  - Capital of: Buzuluksky District, Town of Buzuluk

Municipal status
  - Urban okrug: Buzuluk Urban Okrug
  - Capital of: Buzuluk Urban Okrug, Buzuluksky Municipal District
- Time zone: UTC+5 (MSK+2)
- Postal code: 461040
- OKTMO ID: 53712000001

Buzuluk (Russian: Бузулу́к) is a town in Orenburg Region, Russia, located on the Samara, Buzuluk, and Domashka Rivers, 246 kilometers (153 mi) northwest of Orenburg and 170 kilometers (110 mi) southeast of Samara. Population: 82,904 (2010 census); 87,286 (2002 census); 83,994 (1989 Soviet census).

== History ==
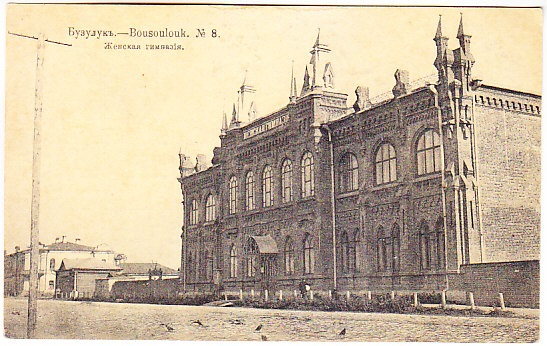
Old gymnasium in the early 20th century

It was founded in 1736 as the fortress of Buzulukskaya (Бузулу́кская) by a Polish noble on the Samara River near the mouth of the Buzuluk River along Russia's southern frontier. It was later moved to its current place near the source of the Domashka River. It was granted town status in 1781.

An important development was the opening, in 1877, of the railway line connecting Samara with Orenburg. Buzuluk was a principal stop along the line, and it is from this period that the town's first power station dates, along with its first schools and libraries. Supported by the rail link and other new infrastructure developments, it now became an important rail-terminal for the transportation of wheat. By 1880, it had a population of 16,340. The population almost doubled between the end of the nineteenth century and 1926.

During World War II, in 1941, the command and staff of the newly formed Polish Anders' Army was based in Buzuluk, and in 1942, the First Czechoslovak Independent Field Battalion was based there. Both formations afterwards fought against Nazi Germany. From September to October 1941, a Polish diplomatic post was located in the city.

== Economy ==
Economic activity is now focused on the extraction and refining of oil.

== Administrative and municipal status ==
Within the framework of administrative divisions, Buzuluk serves as the administrative center of Buzuluksky District, even though it is not a part of it. As an administrative division, it is incorporated separately as the Town of Buzuluk—an administrative unit with the status equal to that of the districts. As a municipal division, the Town of Buzuluk is incorporated as Buzuluk Urban Okrug.

== Climate ==
Climate data for Buzuluk
Month	Jan	Feb	Mar	Apr	May	Jun	Jul	Aug	Sep	Oct	Nov	Dec	Year
Record high °C (°F)	4.7 (40.5)	5.8 (42.4)	18.9 (66.0)	31.3 (88.3)	36.5 (97.7)	39.8 (103.6)	41.6 (106.9)	40.9 (105.6)	38.0 (100.4)	27.0 (80.6)	19.2 (66.6)	8.1 (46.6)	41.6 (106.9)
Mean daily maximum °C (°F)	−8 (18)	−7.2 (19.0)	−0.8 (30.6)	12.8 (55.0)	22.1 (71.8)	27.5 (81.5)	29.0 (84.2)	27.4 (81.3)	20.9 (69.6)	11.2 (52.2)	0.3 (32.5)	−5.9 (21.4)	10.8 (51.4)
Daily mean °C (°F)	−11.8 (10.8)	−11.5 (11.3)	−5.2 (22.6)	6.9 (44.4)	15.2 (59.4)	20.6 (69.1)	22.3 (72.1)	20.3 (68.5)	14.0 (57.2)	5.9 (42.6)	−3.2 (26.2)	−9.5 (14.9)	5.3 (41.5)
Mean daily minimum °C (°F)	−15.6 (3.9)	−15.7 (3.7)	−9.3 (15.3)	1.7 (35.1)	8.5 (47.3)	13.8 (56.8)	15.6 (60.1)	13.6 (56.5)	7.9 (46.2)	1.6 (34.9)	−6.1 (21.0)	−13.1 (8.4)	0.2 (32.4)
Record low °C (°F)	−43.2 (−45.8)	−40.1 (−40.2)	−36.8 (−34.2)	−26.0 (−14.8)	−5.7 (21.7)	−0.7 (30.7)	4.9 (40.8)	−0.7 (30.7)	−5.3 (22.5)	−19.8 (−3.6)	−35.7 (−32.3)	−39.2 (−38.6)	−43.2 (−45.8)
Average precipitation mm (inches)	29 (1.1)	22 (0.9)	25 (1.0)	28 (1.1)	30 (1.2)	36 (1.4)	41 (1.6)	29 (1.1)	27 (1.1)	34 (1.3)	33 (1.3)	31 (1.2)	365 (14.4)
Source: Pogoda i Klimat
