= Kwatisuchus =

Scientific classification
- Domain: Eukaryota
- Kingdom: Animalia
- Phylum: Chordata
- Order: †Temnospondyli
- Suborder: †Stereospondyli
- Family: †Benthosuchidae
- Genus: †Kwatisuchus; Pinheiro, Eltink, Paes-Neto, Machado, Simões, and Pierce, 2024
- Species: †K. rosai

Binomial name
- †Kwatisuchus rosai Pinheiro, Eltink, Paes-Neto, Machado, Simões, and Pierce, 2024

Extinct genus of amphibians

Kwatisuchus (from the Tupi kwa 'tim for 'pointy nose' and the Greek suchus for crocodile) is a genus of benthosuchid temnospondyl amphibian from Early Triassic deposits of Brazil. It is represented by the type species, Kwatisuchus rosai, which was named for one specimen collected from the Granja Palmeiras site in Rosário do Sul, Brazil. This is the only definitive occurrence of benthosuchids in Gondwana; other benthosuchids such as Benthosuchus are known mainly from Russia.

== Description ==
The type and only species, K. rosai, is diagnosed by a combination of differential features of the skull roof and palate separating it from other benthosuchids and several autapomorphies: 1) anterior margin of the vomers well-developed anterolaterally but not anteromedially and with rudimentary medial spike-like projections; 2) weak inflection of the supraorbital sensory groove on the nasal; and 3) straight nasal-lacrimal suture. As the holotype consists only of a partial snout, other skeletal regions cannot be assessed in K. rosai. Despite its fragmentary nature, a combination of various features such as a heart-shaped anterior palatal vacuity and a V-shaped row of transvomerine teeth support benthosuchid affinities.

== Discovery and naming ==
The holotype and only known specimen, an incomplete snout, was collected from the Granja Palmeiras site in Rosário do Sul. This site preserves outcrops of the Sanga do Cabral Formation and has also produced the remains of predominantly indeterminate fish, temnospondyls, procolophonid parareptiles, archosauromorphs, and disputed synapsids. As with the holotype of K. rosai, most specimens are highly fragmentary and exhibit signs of having been transported and reworked. While other more taxonomically definitive temnospondyls are known from other localities in the Sanga do Cabral Formation, none have been recorded at Granja Palmeiras.

The taxon was named by paleontologists Felipe Pinheiro, Estevan Eltink, Voltaire Paes-Neto, Arielli Machado, Tiago Simões, and Stephanie Pierce. The species epithet is in honor of the Brazilian scientist Átila A. Stock Da-Rosa.
