= Qantas (genus) =

Qantas Temporal range: Early Triassic

Scientific classification
- Kingdom: Animalia
- Phylum: Chordata
- Clade: Tetrapoda
- Order: †Temnospondyli
- Suborder: †Stereospondyli
- Subfamily: †Qantasinae; Novikov, 2012
- Genus: †Qantas; Novikov, 2012

Type species
- †Qantas samarensis Novikov, 2012

Extinct genus of amphibians

Qantas is a genus of trematosauroid temnospondyl from the Early Triassic. Fossils have been found from the Kamennyi Yar Formation in Borsky District, Samara Oblast. The type species Qantas samarensis was named in 2012 and placed in the family Benthosuchidae, as it was viewed as a close relative of Benthosuchus. The subfamily Qantasinae was established to include Qantas, and possibly the genus Tirraturhinus. Qantas is named after the Australian airline Qantas, which supported the original study of the fossils.

== Phylogeny ==
Qantas in a cladogram after Novikov (2018) with only Early Triassic Eastern Europe taxa included:

- Temnospondyli
  - Luzocephalus
  - - Capitosauridae
      - - Samarabatrachus
        - - Parotosuchus
          - Poryolosuchus
      - - Selenocara
        - - Wetlugasaurus
          - Vladlenosaurus
    - - Quantas
      - - - Syrtosuchus
          - - Benthosuchus
            - - Yarengiidae
                - Vyborosaurus
                - Yarengia
        - Trematosauridae
          - Prothoosuchus
          - - Thoosuchus
            - - Trematotegmen
              - - Angusaurus
                - - Inflectosaurus
                  - Trematosaurus
