= Mordovsky (inhabited locality) =

Mordovsky (Russian: Мордовский; masculine), Mordovskaya (Мордовская; feminine), or Mordovskoye (Мордовское; neuter) is the name of several rural localities in Russia:

- Mordovsky (rural locality), a settlement in Zhilinsky Selsoviet of Buzuluksky District of Orenburg Oblast
- Mordovskoye, Ivanovo Oblast, a selo in Yuzhsky District of Ivanovo Oblast
- Mordovskoye, Kaliningrad Oblast, a settlement in Dobrinsky Rural Okrug of Guryevsky District of Kaliningrad Oblast
- Mordovskoye, Nizhny Novgorod Oblast, a village in Kalininsky Selsoviet of Pavlovsky District of Nizhny Novgorod Oblast
