= Coelodontognathus =

Coelodontognathus Temporal range: Early Triassic

Scientific classification
- Domain: Eukaryota
- Kingdom: Animalia
- Phylum: Chordata
- Class: Reptilia
- Clade: Archosauromorpha
- Clade: †Allokotosauria
- Order: †Trilophosauria (?)
- Family: †Trilophosauridae (?)
- Genus: †Coelodontognathus; Otshev, 1967

Species
- †C. donensis Otshev, 1967 (type); †C. ricovi Otshev, 1967

Extinct genus of reptiles

Coelodontognathus is an extinct genus of reptile from the Early Triassic (late Olenekian stage) of European Russia. It was originally described as a procolophonid parareptile in 1967 but was reclassified as a possible trilophosaurid archosauromorph in 2008. The genus includes two species: the type species C. donensis and C. ricovi. C. donensis is known from the holotype PIN 4173/129 (SGU 104/3103) and the referred PIN 4173/130 (SGU 104/3104), and C. ricovi is known from the holotype PIN 4173/127 (SGU 104/3101) and the referred PIN 4173/128 (SGU 104/3102), all of which represent dentaries that are housed at the Paleontological Institute, Russian Academy of Sciences. Another dentary, SGU 104/3105, originally referred to C. donensis was reassigned to its own genus and species Vitalia grata by Ivakhnenko, 1973. The fossils have been found at the Donskaya Luka Locality near the village of Sirotinskaya and the Don River in Ilovlinsky District, Volgograd Oblast, from the Lipovskaya Formation of the Gamskii Horizon. Like Coelodontognathus, Vitalia which is known from the same locality was also first identified as a procolophonid and later reclassified as a trilophosaurid. Coelodontognathus and Vitalia are similar to procolophonids in that they have wide teeth but differs from them in that they have tooth roots set deep into the jaws.
