= Novosergiyevka =

Novosergiyevka (Russian: Новосергиевка) is the name of several rural localities in Russia:

- Novosergiyevka, Kursk Oblast, a village in Titovsky Selsoviet of Shchigrovsky District of Kursk Oblast
- Novosergiyevka, Leningrad Oblast, a village in Zanevskoye Settlement Municipal Formation of Vsevolozhsky District of Leningrad Oblast
- Novosergiyevka, Novosergiyevsky District, Orenburg Oblast, a settlement in Novosergiyevsky Settlement Council of Novosergiyevsky District of Orenburg Oblast
- Novosergiyevka, Tyulgansky District, Orenburg Oblast, a khutor in Gorodetsky Selsoviet of Tyulgansky District of Orenburg Oblast
