= Trematotegmen =

Scientific classification
- Kingdom: Animalia
- Phylum: Chordata
- Clade: Tetrapoda
- Order: †Temnospondyli
- Suborder: †Stereospondyli
- Family: †Trematosauridae
- Genus: †Trematotegmen; Getmanov, 1982

Type species
- †T. ostchevi Getmanov, 1982

Extinct genus of amphibians

Trematotegmen is an extinct genus of trematosaurian temnospondyl within the family Trematosauridae.

== Phylogeny ==
Trematotegmen in a cladogram after Novikov (2018) with only Early Triassic Eastern Europe taxa included:

- Temnospondyli
  - Luzocephalus
  - - Capitosauridae
      - - Samarabatrachus
        - - Poryolosuchus
          - Parotosuchus
      - - Selenocara
        - - Wetlugasaurus
          - Vladlenosaurus
    - - Qantas
      - - Trematosauridae
          - Prothoosuchus
          - - Thoosuchus
            - - Trematotegmen
              - - Angusaurus
                - - Inflectosaurus
                  - Trematosaurus
        - - Syrtosuchus
          - - Benthosuchus
            - - Yarengiidae
                - Vyborosaurus
                - Yarengia

== See also ==
- Prehistoric amphibian
- List of prehistoric amphibians
