= Borskoye, Samara Oblast =

Rural locality in Samara Oblast, Russia

Coordinates: 53°01′34″N 51°41′54″E

Borskoye (Russian: Борское) is a rural locality (a selo) and the administrative center of Borsky District, Samara Oblast, Russia. Population: 8,953 (2010 census); 9,190 (2002 census); 9,023 (1989 Soviet census).
