= Scythosuchus =

Scythosuchus Temporal range: Early Triassic

Scientific classification
- Kingdom: Animalia
- Phylum: Chordata
- Class: Reptilia
- Clade: Pseudosuchia
- Family: †Rauisuchidae
- Genus: †Scythosuchus; Sennikov, 1999

Type species
- †Scythosuchus basileus Sennikov, 1999

Extinct genus of reptiles

Scythosuchus is an extinct genus of rauisuchid. Remains have been found from Olenekian-age Lower Triassic beds in Russia, hence the name meaning 'Scythian crocodile'.

== Discovery ==
The type and only species is S. basileus, described in 1999. Scythosuchus was between 2 and 3 metres long, and relatively heavily built. It is known from a partial skull, much of the spine, a fragment of the humerus and most of the hind leg and foot. Sennikov (2022) suggested that Scythosuchus may be synonymous with Tsylmosuchus donensis, but Ezcuraa et al. (2023) reclassified Tsylmosuchus as a proterosuchid instead of a pseudosuchian.

== Features ==
=== Skull ===
The skull material known is fragmentary, with a few parts of the cranium, the maxilla and some of the rostrum, and several examples of teeth. The maxilla is long, as is the preorbital fenestra just above it, and has a break indicating that there was probably a large medial process. The whole snout was slightly elongated but quite narrow. The blade-like teeth are laterally compressed and serrated, with a slight backwards curve, and would have been excellent for slicing through flesh, clearly indicating that Scythosuchus was a carnivore like other rauisuchids. The cranium is relatively small, and the postorbital bone is stout and thick with some rugosities in the central area. All of the squamosal processes are heavy and well-developed. The lower jaw is thick and has very expanded articular areas, possibly indicating a powerful bite as it would have been quite difficult for a struggling prey animal to break free.

=== Vertebrae ===
The cervical vertebrae are slightly elongated, with the centra constricted between the wide articular surfaces. These articular surfaces are rounded. The zygapophyses have large articular surfaces oriented obliquely. The centra are approximately 1.2 times as long as they are high, and the neural spines are also very low and poorly developed, with a slightly widened and thickened tip making them top-heavy. As the vertebrae move back from the skull, the neural spines grow thicker, heavier and more rugose at the dorsal ends until they resemble osteoderms. (They are not osteoderms as these were paired in the Rauisuchia and not fused to the vertebrae - none have been identified for this species.)

The thoracic vertebrae look quite similar to the cervical vertebrae, with lengthened centra and heavy rugose tips to their neural spines. However, the neural spines themselves are much longer than those on the cervical vertebrae, and by the posterior thoracic vertebrae are also relatively narrow. The centra have perfectly round articular facets and are slightly constricted in the centre.

The caudal vertebrae also have lengthened centra, especially at the posterior end of the tail, and these grow longer and longer posteriorly. The articular facets are also tall and narrow, rather than perfectly round. The neural spines are much less rugose and heavy at the tips, but are short and thick, with a slight tilt backwards, and located on the posterior part of the centra.

=== Forelimb ===
Only the humerus is known, and of that only a fragment with most of the proximal end. This is strongly expanded, narrowing steeply and indicating that the main length of the bone may be rather slender.

=== Pelvis and hindlimb ===
A fragmentary ilium is all that is known from the pelvis, with a thick anterior edge and a well-developed dorsal process. The femur is much better known, as several specimens have been found, and was sigmoidal with weak lateral compression. A trochanter projects from near the proximal end of the bone and is relatively close to it. The tibia is well preserved, as it is relatively stout as well as being lengthened, and twists slightly from proximal to distal end. The proximal end is also more oval and the distal end almost perfectly round. There are fragments of fibula known; these indicate that this was also rather stout. The calcaneum is short and slightly L-shaped, with a calcaneum tuber projecting to the rear and side. Rugosities on this indicate attachments for the calf muscles. There are several facets on the calcaneum for other bones of the foot, most noticeably for the astragalus and with smaller ones for the tarsals. The overall shape of the calcaneum indicates an ankle joint intermediate between thecodonts and crocodilians.
