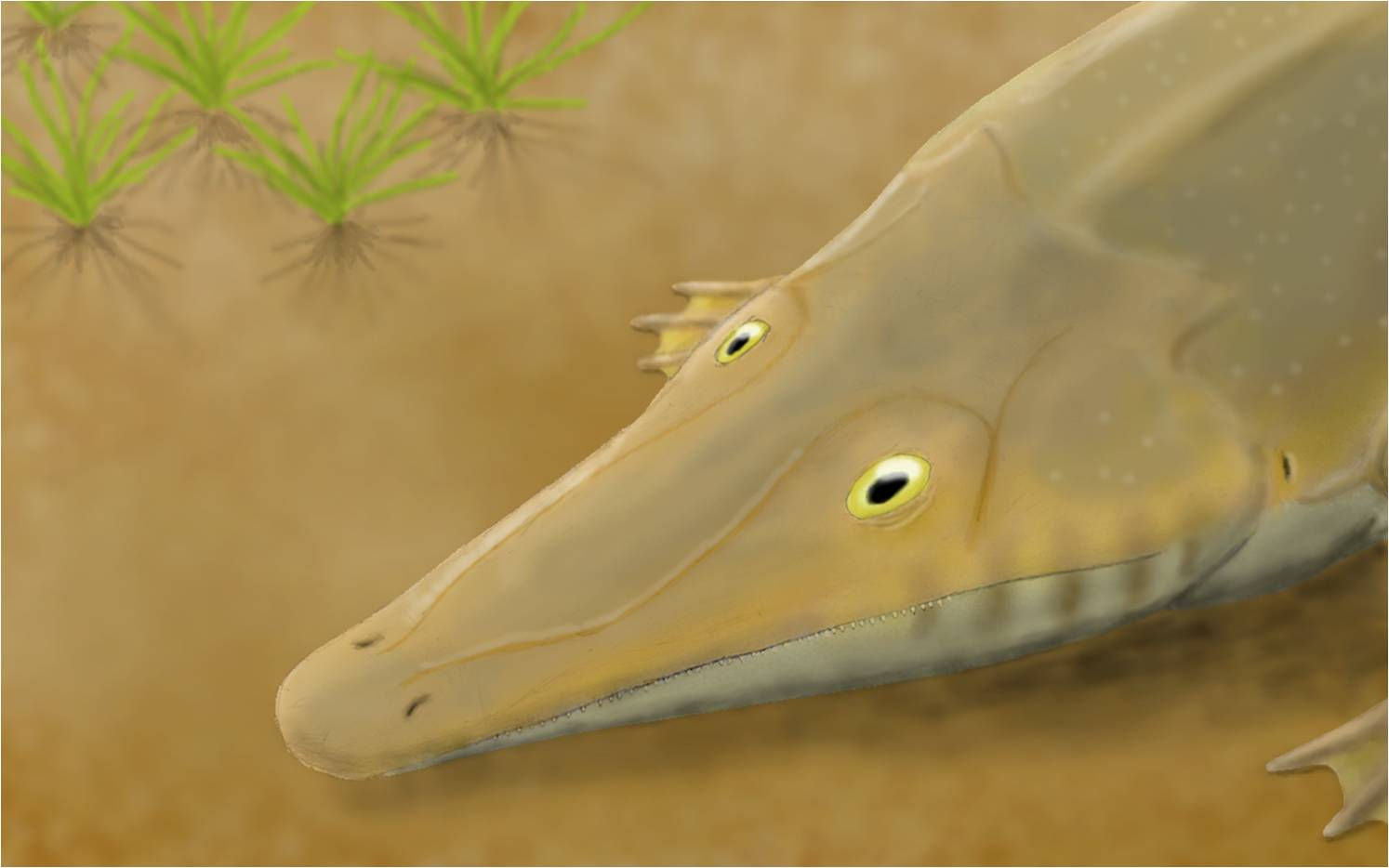
- Life restoration of Thoosuchus yakovlevi

Scientific classification
- Kingdom: Animalia
- Phylum: Chordata
- Clade: Tetrapoda
- Order: †Temnospondyli
- Suborder: †Stereospondyli
- Family: †Thoosuchidae
- Genus: †Thoosuchus; Efremov, 1940

Species
- T. abbasovi Novikov, 2021; T. acutirostris Efremov, 1940 (type); T. yakovlevi (Ryabinin 1926); T. tardus Getmanov, 1989; T. tuberculatus Getmanov, 1989

= Thoosuchus =

Thoosuchus Temporal range: Early Triassic

Extinct genus of amphibians

Thoosuchus (meaning "active crocodile") is an extinct genus of basal trematosauroid trematosaurian temnospondyl. Fossils have been found from Russia and date back to the Early Triassic. It is the type genus of the family Thoosuchidae, formerly called the subfamily Thoosuchinae and placed within Benthosuchidae. The benthosuchids were originally composed of the majority of basal trematosaurian forms regarded as the ancestors of the trematosaurids.

== Discovery and naming ==
Although the genus was first named in 1940, material from one species, E. yakovlevi, was originally tentatively referred to Trematosuchus in 1926. Russian paleontologist Ivan Yefremov [Efremov] named it Thoosuchus "active crocodile" (from Ancient Greek θοός (thoos) "nimble, active" and σοῦχος (soukhos) "crocodile") in 1940, "in view of its obviously more active mode of life in water than the mode of life of Benthosuchus" (page 13).

== Description ==
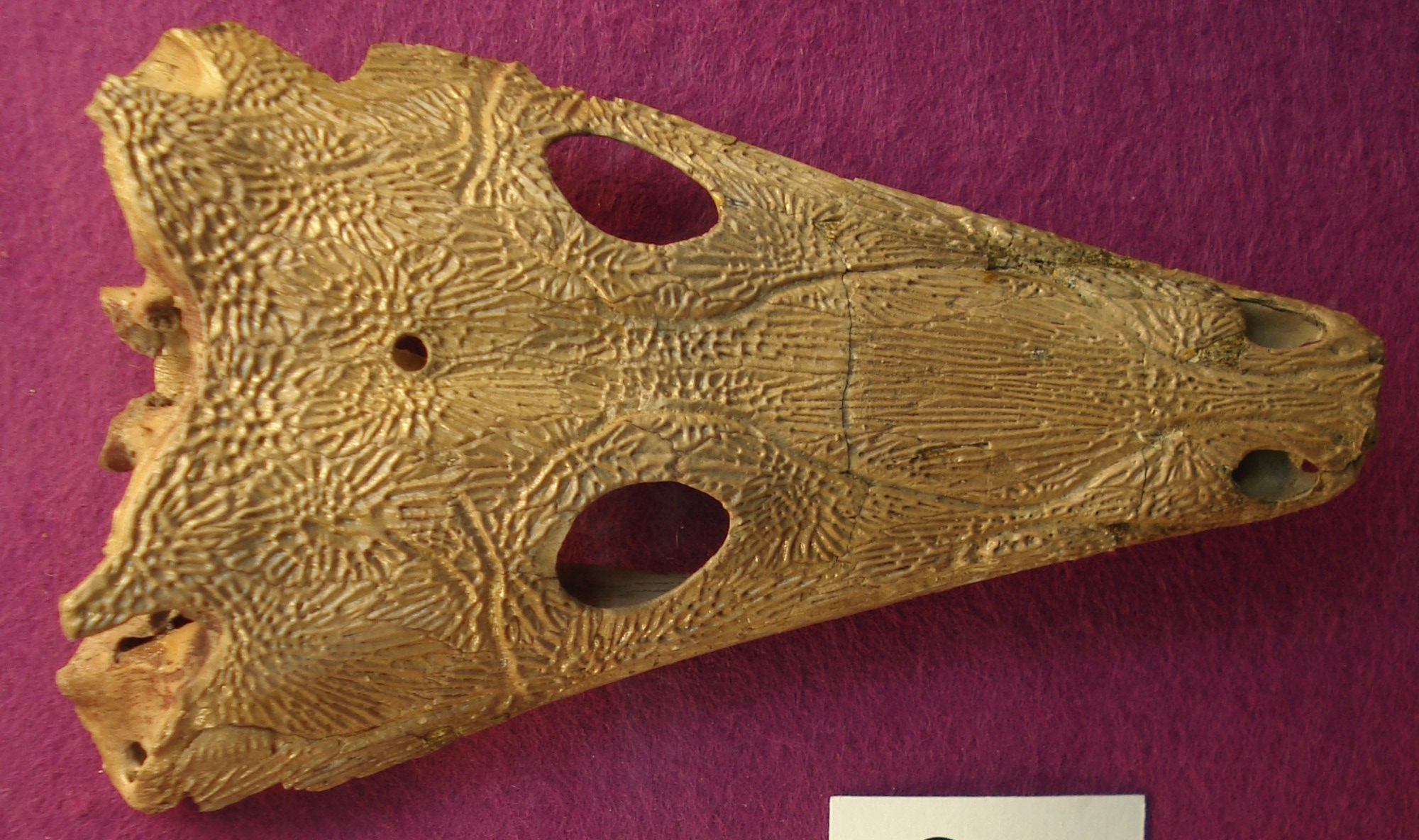
Thoosuchus jakovlevi skull

For its family, Thoosuchus was fairly small, reaching a little over 60 cm with a 15 cm skull.

Thoosuchus superficially resembles the more derived trematosaurids, but can be distinguished from them on the basis of a deep, narrowing otic notch. It had widely spaced orbits and a moderately elongated skull roof that was well ornamented with ridges and grooves, especially on the parietals. This ornamentation is also a characteristic of trematosaurids and has been described as representing a "zone of intensive growth". The well developed lateral line system of Thoosuchus is indicative of its presumed aquatic lifestyle.

== Phylogeny ==
Thoosuchus in a cladogram after Novikov (2018) with only Early Triassic Eastern Europe taxa included:

- Temnospondyli
  - Luzocephalus
  - - Capitosauridae
      - - Samarabatrachus
        - - Poryolosuchus
          - Parotosuchus
      - - Selenocara
        - - Wetlugasaurus
          - Vladlenosaurus
    - - Qantas
      - - Trematosauridae
          - Prothoosuchus
          - - Thoosuchus
            - - Trematotegmen
              - - Angusaurus
                - - Inflectosaurus
                  - Trematosaurus
        - - Syrtosuchus
          - - Benthosuchus
            - - Yarengiidae
                - Vyborosaurus
                - Yarengia

== See also ==
- Prehistoric amphibian
- List of prehistoric amphibians
