= Yarenskian Gorizont =

Geologic formation in Russia

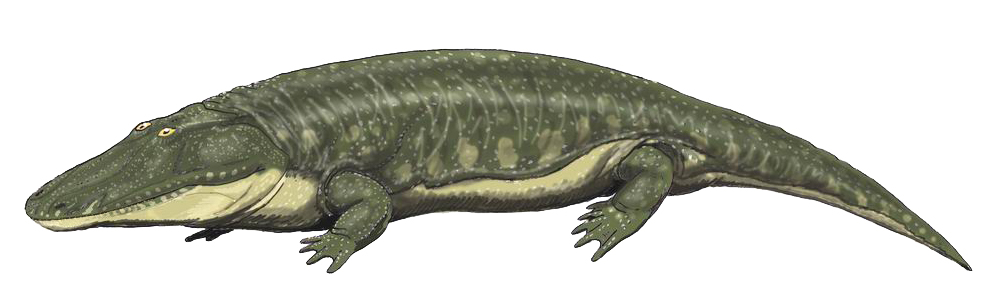
Parotosuchus, an index fossil of the Yarenskian.

The Yarenskian Gorizont ("Yarenskian Horizon") is a major biostratigraphic unit in Russia corresponding to Upper Olenekian-age terrestrial sediments. It lies above the Ustmylian Gorizont of the Vetlugian Supergorizont, and is located below a short unconformity overlain by the Donguz Gorizont. Some paleontologists elevate the Yarenskian to a supergorizont and subdivide it into two smaller units: the older Fedorovskian Gorizont (Fedorovkian Horizon) and the younger Gamskian Gorizont (Gamian Horizon). Others prefer to consider the Fedorovskian and Gamskian to be subgorizonts or members of the Yarenskian. Vertebrate index fossils of the Fedorovskian include the lungfish Gnathorhiza, the trematosaurid Inflectosaurus, and the procolophonid Burtensia. In the Gamskian, these index fossils are replaced by Ceratodus, Trematosaurus, and Kapes, respectively. The Yarenskian as a whole is characterized by the capitosaur amphibian Parotosuchus, and has also been known as the Parotosuchus fauna. A few geographical influence on the faunas can be observed; erythrosuchids and rhytidosteids are more common in southern exposures while procolophonids and putative "rauisuchids" are more common in the north.

The Yarenskian encompasses several svitas (equivalent to geological formations). The most fossiliferous and best-exposed is the Petropavlovskaya Svita (anglicized as Petropavlovka Formation), a Fedorovskian-age assemblage in the Cis-Ural region (near the Ural River in Orenburg Oblast). Another productive unit is the Gamskian-age Lipovskaya Formation, which is found near the Don River in Volgograd Oblast. The Caspian Depression includes coastal sediments equivalent to the Yarenskian (such as the Bogdo or Bogdinskaya Svita), though there is some controversy over how the stratigraphy of the area should be defined. Thin exposures of Yarenskian units are also known further north in the Vyatka, Vychegda, Luza, and Pechora basins.
