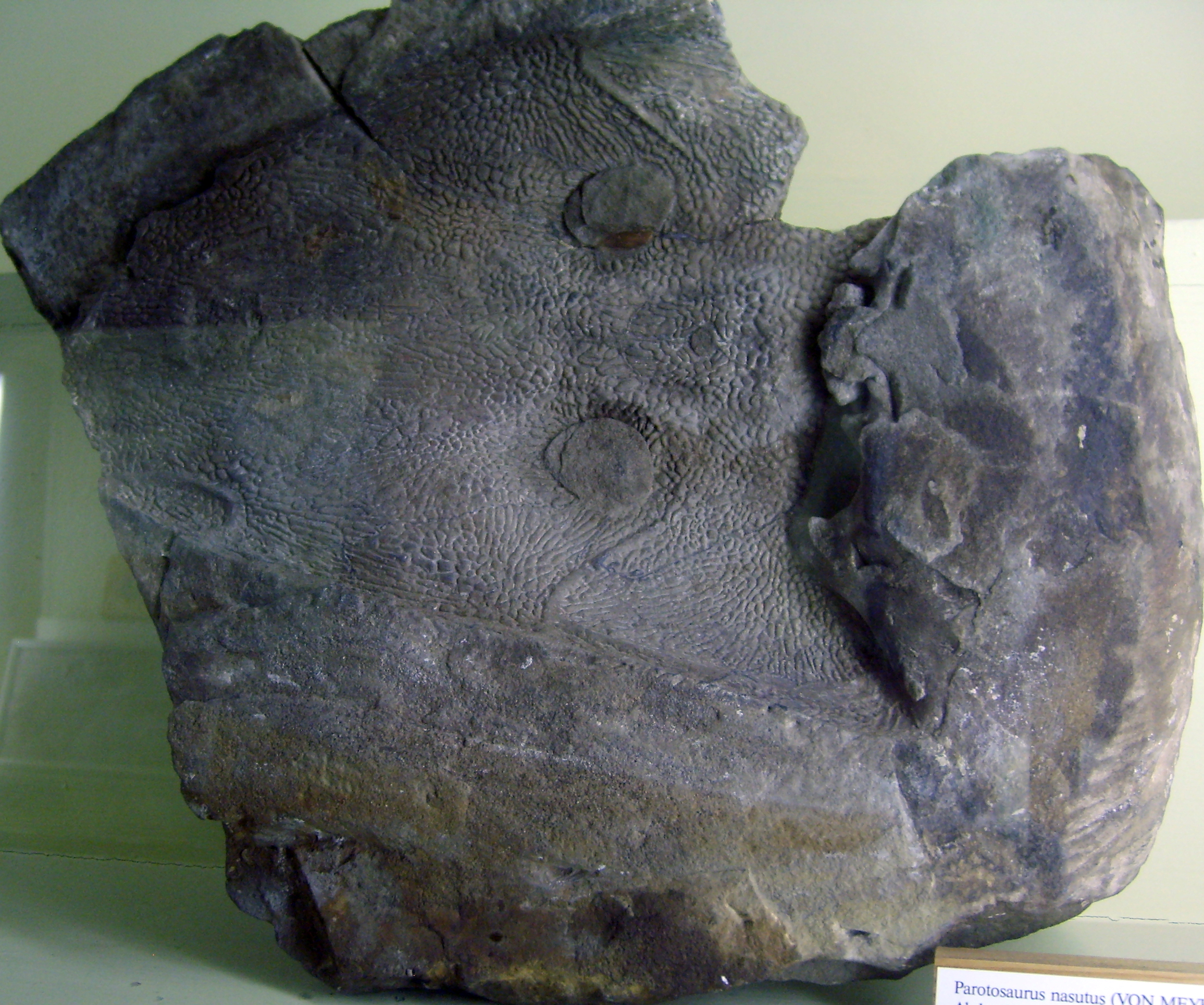
- Skull impression of P. nasutus in the Museum für Naturkunde, Berlin

Scientific classification
- Kingdom: Animalia
- Phylum: Chordata
- Clade: Tetrapoda
- Order: †Temnospondyli
- Suborder: †Stereospondyli
- Clade: †Capitosauria
- Family: †Mastodonsauridae
- Genus: †Parotosuchus; Otschev and Shishkin, 1968

Species
- †P. nasutus (Meyer, 1858); †P. helgolandicus (Schröder, 1913); †P. haughtoni (Broili & Schröder, 1937); †P. orenburgensis (Konzhukova, 1965); †P. orientalis (Otschev, 1966); †P. panteleevi (Otschev, 1966); †P. ptaszynskii Sulej and Niedźwiedzki, 2013; †P. sequester Lozovsky & Shishkin, 1974; †P. speleus Mikhail A. Shishkin and Tomasz Sulej, 2009; †P. komiensis Novikov, 1986

Synonyms
- Archotosaurus Patton, 1976

= Parotosuchus =

Parotosuchus Temporal range: Early Triassic, ~251.902–246.7 Ma

Extinct genus of temnospondyls

Parotosuchus is an extinct genus of capitosaurian temnospondyls within the family Mastodonsauridae. Fossils are known from the Early Triassic of Europe, Africa, Australia, and Antarctica. It was about 2 metres (6.6 ft) long and likely lived in aquatic environments such as lakes and rivers. Parotosuchus was covered in a scaly skin, unlike the smooth skin of modern-day amphibians, and probably moved with an eel-like motion in the water.

== Etymology ==
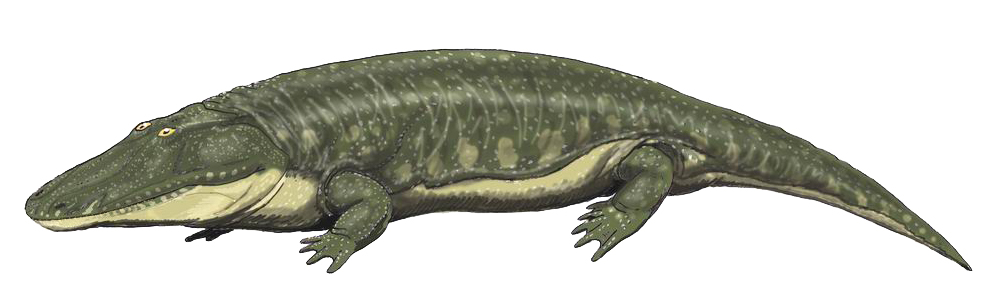
Life restoration of P. orenburgensis

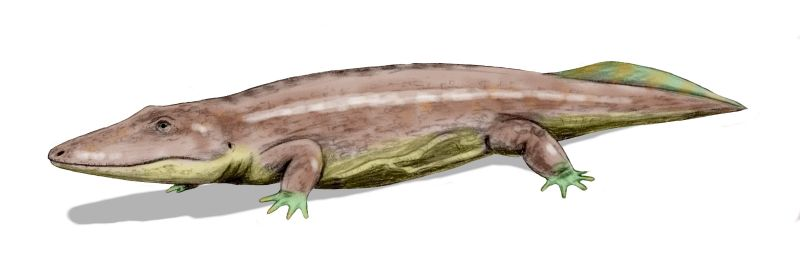
Life restoration of P. nasutus

Parotosuchus was originally named Parotosaurus. However, the name Parotosaurus was preoccupied by a genus of skinks, and in 1968 the name Parotosuchus was proposed as a replacement. The name Archotosaurus was also proposed as a replacement name in 1976, although the author who proposed this was unaware that Parotosuchus was already in use. Because the name Parotosuchus was erected earlier than Archotosaurus, it has priority.

== Phylogeny ==
Parotosuchus in a cladogram after Novikov (2018) with only Early Triassic Eastern Europe taxa included:

- Temnospondyli
  - Luzocephalus
  - - Capitosauridae
      - - Samarabatrachus
        - - Poryolosuchus
          - Parotosuchus
      - - Selenocara
        - - Wetlugasaurus
          - Vladlenosaurus
    - - Qantas
      - - Trematosauridae
          - Prothoosuchus
          - - Thoosuchus
            - - Trematotegmen
              - - Angusaurus
                - - Inflectosaurus
                  - Trematosaurus
        - - Syrtosuchus
          - - Benthosuchus
            - - Yarengiidae
                - Vyborosaurus
                - Yarengia

== Palaeobiology ==
The very robust skull of Parotosuchus has led to inferences that it was a generalist predator able to prey on a wide array of differently sized animals.
