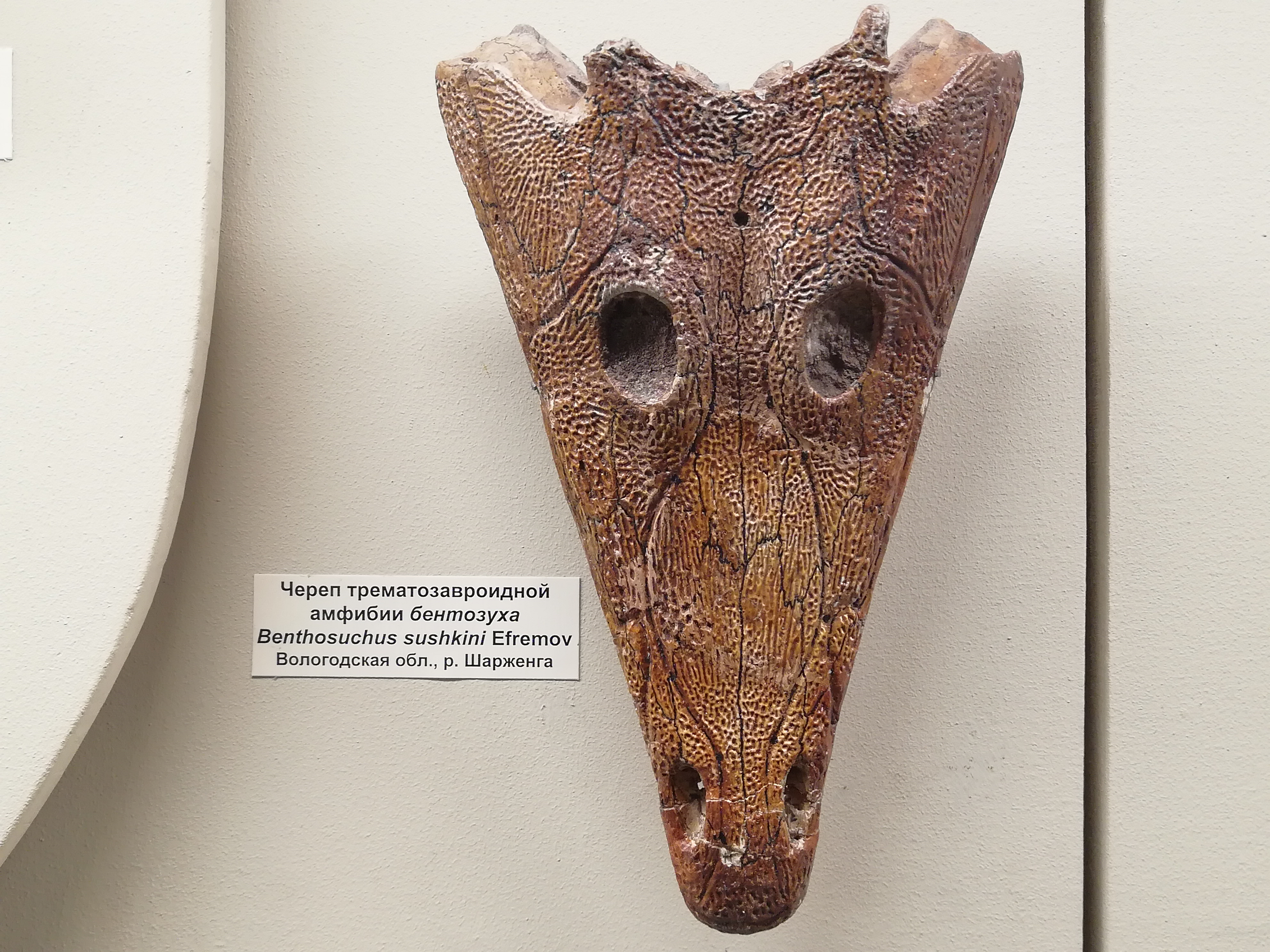
- Skull of Benthosuchus sushkini

Scientific classification
- Kingdom: Animalia
- Phylum: Chordata
- Clade: Tetrapoda
- Order: †Temnospondyli
- Suborder: †Stereospondyli
- Family: †Benthosuchidae; Efremov, 1940
- Genus: †Benthosuchus; Efremov, 1937

Species
- †B. sushkini (Efremov, 1929 [originally Benthosaurus sushkini]) (type); †B. korobkovi Ivachnenko, 1972; †B. bashkiricus Otschev, 1972; †B. gusevae Novikov, 2012; †B. lukyanovi Morkovin, 2020

= Benthosuchus =

Benthosuchus Temporal range: Early Triassic, 251–247 Ma

Extinct genus of amphibians

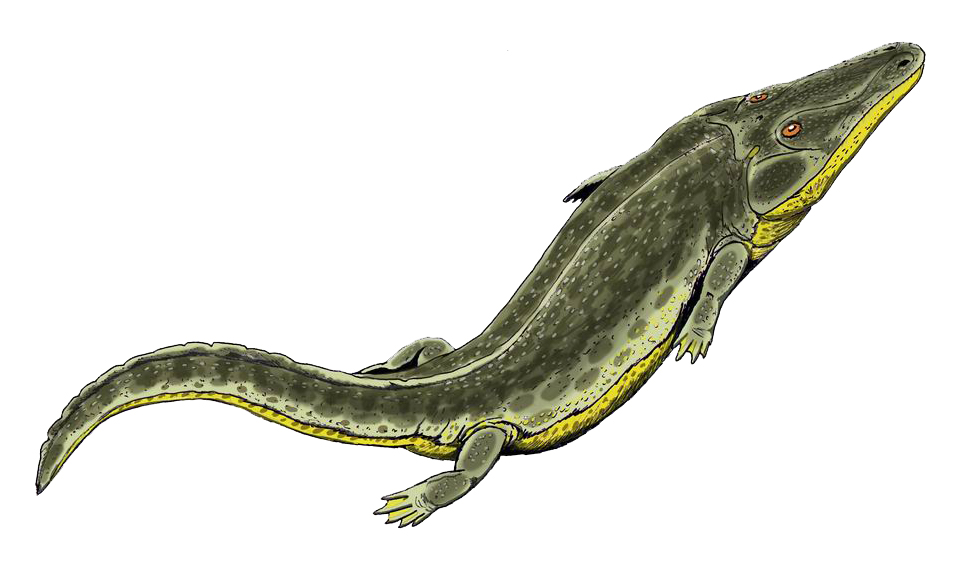
Life restoration of Benthosuchus sushkini

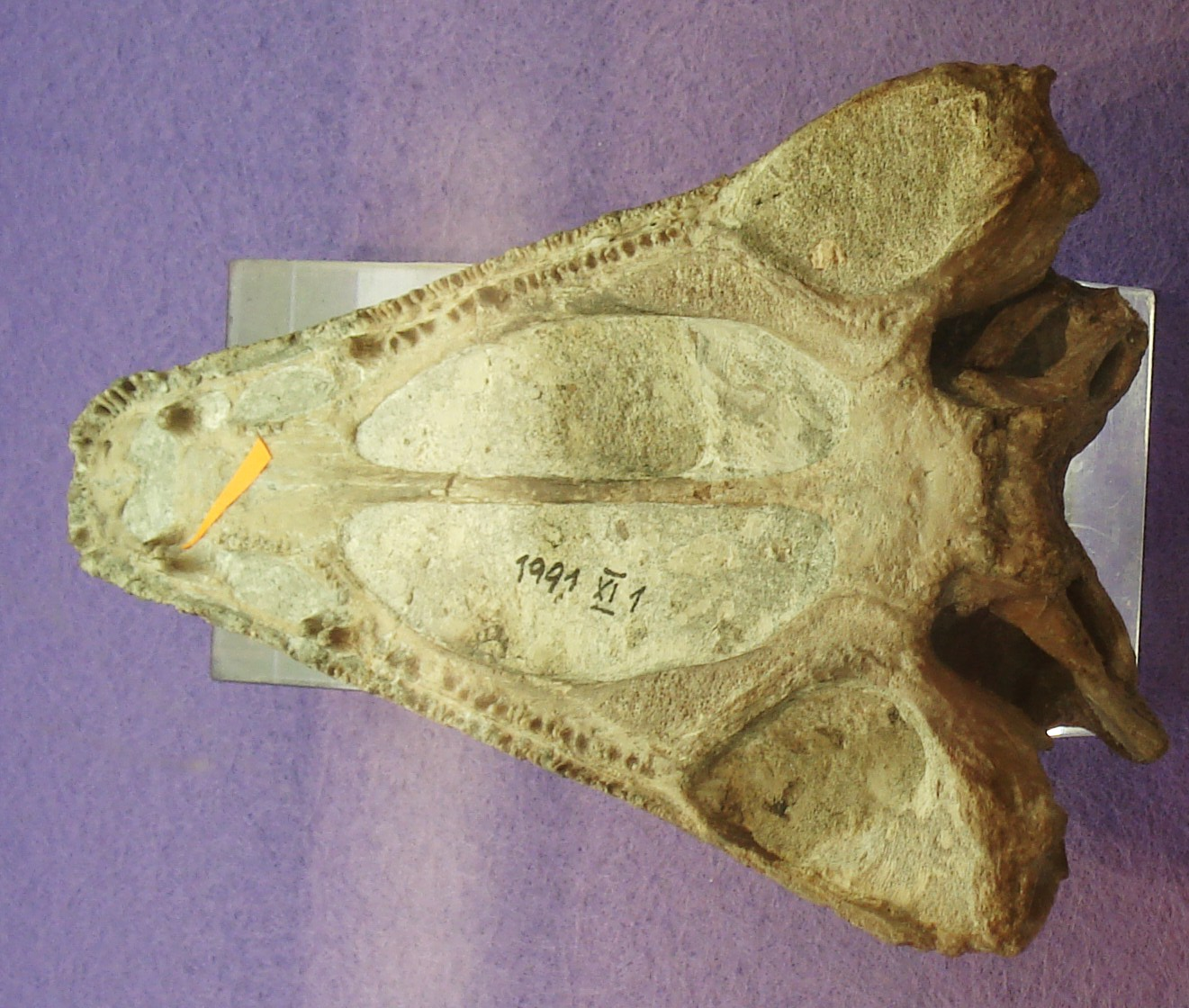
Underside of the skull of the species Benthosuchus korobkovi showing double rows of small teeth and large fangs on the front palate

Benthosuchus (meaning "deep water crocodile") is an extinct genus of temnospondyl amphibian from the Early Triassic of Russia. It was primarily aquatic, living in rivers and lakes. Multiple species are known, with the largest reaching about 2.5 meters in length.

Russian paleontologist Ivan Yefremov [Efremov] called the genus Benthosaurus "deep water lizard" (from Ancient Greek βένθος (benthos) "depth, deep water") in his original 1929 description, "in view of its clearly indicated adaptation to life in deep water" shown by "the position of the orbits and the flatness of the skull." The type species B. sushkini honored his late teacher Petr Sushkin. The generic name was preoccupied by Benthosaurus Goode & Bean, 1886, a fish, and he renamed the genus Benthosuchus ("deep water crocodile") in 1937.

Benthosuchus has traditionally been considered a member of the temnospondyl superfamily Trematosauroidea, and the family Benthosuchidae was established in 1940 to include Benthosuchus and the related trematosauroid Thoosuchus. Some recent phylogenetic studies have removed Benthosuchus from Trematosauroidea entirely, placing it as a closer relative of Mastodonsauroidea, another group of Triassic temnospondyls. Other studies retain Benthosuchus within Trematosauroidea, but since Benthosuchus and Thoosuchus have successively basal positions on these trees they form a paraphyletic grouping, not a valid clade. Benthosuchidae was widely considered to be a monotypic family containing only Benthosuchus, until the discovery of the related Kwatisuchus in 2024.

== Description ==
Benthosuchus skull is about 0.75 m long (it is comparatively short in young individuals but lengthens with age), and the overall body length is about 2.5 m. It existed in widely overflowing rivers of the East Russian Depression.

== Phylogeny ==
Benthosuchus is traditionally considered a close relative of a group of temnospondyls called capitosaurids. In particular, it bears a close resemblance to the capitosaurid Wetlugasaurus. Many of the early large-scale phylogenetic analyses of temnospondyls place Benthosuchus within a clade called Capitosauria. However, more recent analyses such as that of Fortuny et al. (2011) recover Benthosuchus within another clade called Trematosauria. Occasionally it is grouped near the trematosaurid family Trematosauridae as a basal member of the group Trematosauroidea. Fortuny et al. found that Benthosuchus positioned outside Trematosauroidea as a more basal trematosaurian. Below is a cladogram from Fortuny et al. (2011) showing the phylogenetic placement of Benthosuchus:

- Stereospondyli
  - Lydekkerina huxleyi
  - Rhinesuchidae
    - Rhineceps nyasaensis
    - Uranocentrodon senekalensis
  - - Capitosauria
      - Wetlugasaurus angustifrons
      - - - Odenwaldia heidelbergensis
          - Vladlenosaurus alexeyevi
        - - - - Edingerella madagascariensis
              - Watsonisuchus spp.
            - - Xenotosuchus africanus
              - - Cherninia denwai
                - - Paracyclotosaurus crookshanki
                  - - - Stanocephalosaurus pronus
                      - Stanocephalosaurus birdi
                    - - Procyclotosaurus stantonensis
                      - - Eocyclotosaurus spp.
                        - Quasicyclotosaurus campi
          - - Parotosuchus orenburgensis
            - - Calmasuchus acri
              - - - Cyclotosaurus robustus
                  - Tatrasuchus wildi
                - - Eryosuchus garjainovi
                  - Mastodonsaurus giganteus
    - Trematosauria
      - Benthosuchus sushkini
      - Trematosauroidea
        - Thoosuchus yakovlevi
        - - Angusaurus spp.
          - Trematosaurus brauni

Cladogram after Novikov (2018) with only Early Triassic Eastern Europe taxa included:

- Temnospondyli
  - Luzocephalus
  - - Capitosauridae
      - - Samarabatrachus
        - - Poryolosuchus
          - Parotosuchus
      - - Selenocara
        - - Wetlugasaurus
          - Vladlenosaurus
    - - Qantas
      - - Trematosauridae
          - Prothoosuchus
          - - Thoosuchus
            - - Trematotegmen
              - - Angusaurus
                - - Inflectosaurus
                  - Trematosaurus
        - - Syrtosuchus
          - - Benthosuchus
            - - Yarengiidae
                - Vyborosaurus
                - Yarengia
