= Horizon (geology) =

Bedding surface, or distinctive layer or thin bed

In geology, a horizon is either a bedding surface where there is marked change in the lithology within a sequence of sedimentary or volcanic rocks, or a distinctive layer or thin bed with a characteristic lithology or fossil content within a sequence. Examples of the former can include things such as volcanic eruptions, as well as things such as meteorite impacts and tsunamis. Examples of the latter include things such as ice ages and other large climate events, as well as large but temporary geological features and changes such as inland oceans. In the interpretation of seismic reflection data, horizons are the reflectors (or seismic events) picked on individual profiles. These reflectors represent a change in rock properties across a boundary between two layers of rock, particularly seismic velocity and density. It can also represent changes in the density of the material and the composition of it and the pressure under which it was produced. Thus, not only do the properties change but so too do the conditions of formation and other differences in the rock. The horizons can sometimes be very prominent, such as visible changes in cliff sides, to extremely subtle chemical differences.

== Marker horizon ==
Marker horizons are stratigraphic units of distinctive lithology (different from the bulk of the sequence) with a wide geographical extent that are used in stratigraphic correlation. Layers of tuff (lithified volcanic ash) as well as sand and organic materials from the ocean (from tsunamis) are often used for this purpose. This is helpful when measuring the time periods of deposits and the layers they are in, as well as determining the age of fossils.

Marker horizons can also indicate the existence of ancient lakebeds and riverbeds, as well as things such as inland oceans. Marker horizons can be important for all fields in geology because they are important indications of all the various changes in the geological time records. As such, they are important in the study of the formation of the Earth and of certain landforms as well as the climate at certain times and the events that may have occurred in certain regions or all over the world.

== Event horizon ==
An event horizon is a bed that marks a geological event, such as an earthquake or a meteorite impact. It is the basic unit used in event stratigraphy. It is related to the marker horizons in that event horizons can be used as a marker horizon, though they are not always the same. Marker horizons can emerge from more situation sources such as inland oceans, whereas event horizons are more often associated with specific events. Event horizons can also be used to indicate events in the geological record. For example, in regions such as Iceland, it is common to find deposits of tephra, a material spewed out of volcanoes in eruptions. Researchers in Iceland have been able to identify roughly 65–75% of all 200 recorded eruptions since 900 AD using the study and analysis of event horizons composed of tephra. This is just one of many important examples of the use of marker horizons and event horizons to study and date events from the past. These event horizons depending on the size of the eruption can commonly be located all over the world and throughout many volcanically active regions. Volcanic eruption deposits can often hold up better than tsunami deposits because they are not always on or near shorelines and as such are less likely to be eroded. However, unlike tsunamis, not all volcanic eruptions produce materials such as tephra that indicate an eruption. Some produce other materials that are not as likely to survive erosion.

Another type of event horizon is provided by tsunami deposits, most commonly found in coastal areas especially in regions along ocean fault lines like Indonesia, Japan and the northwestern United States. Most date from the current Quaternary period. Coastal erosion may remove shoreline deposits but they may be found inland, above this erosion-prone level or else out at sea, below this level. These deposits are usually of sand and organic material (such as corals) and other material found along shorelines and the ocean floor. They can be found many miles inland or just along the coast.

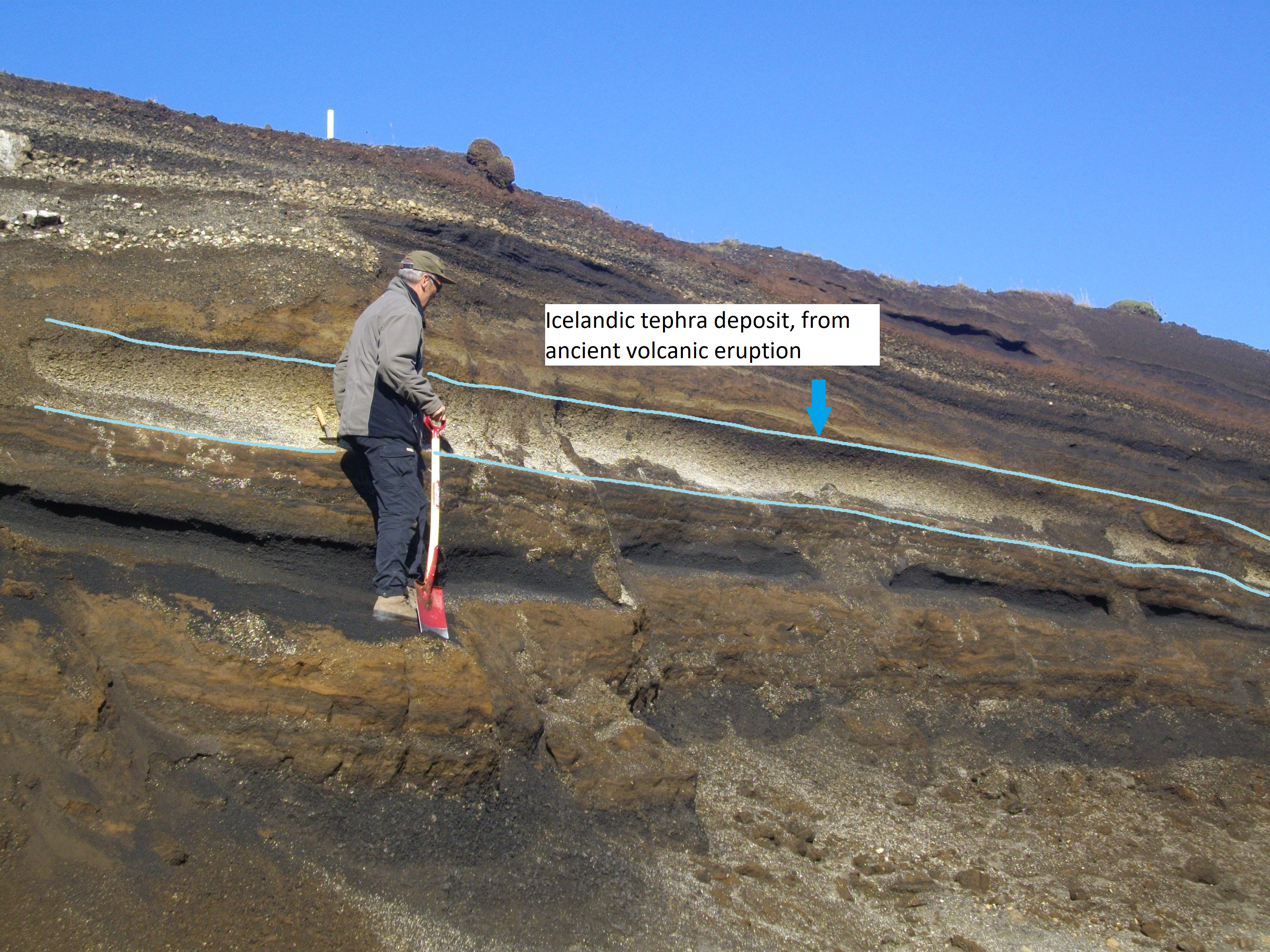
Tephra horizons in south central Iceland

== Gorizont ==
The main unit of regional stratigraphic schemes in Russia, the gorizont, can be anglicized as "horizon". However, this concept is not equivalent to the term used in Western geological systems. While the Western term "horizon" pertains to a small lithological section within a geological formation, a gorizont is a broad biostratigraphic unit. It may encompass several "svitas" (lithological units equivalent to a formation) or parts of them. Both gorizonts and svitas are also considered chronostratigraphic units (correlated with a distinct time interval), while Western geologists have separate chronological and stratigraphic systems.
