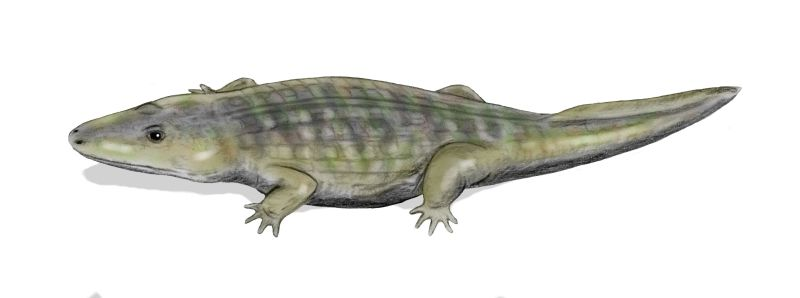

Scientific classification
- Kingdom: Animalia
- Phylum: Chordata
- Clade: Tetrapoda
- Order: †Temnospondyli
- Suborder: †Stereospondyli
- Clade: †Capitosauria
- Family: †Mastodonsauridae
- Genus: †Wetlugasaurus; Riabinin, 1930

Species
- †W. angustifrons Riabinin, 1930 (type); †W. malachovi Novikov, 1990

= Wetlugasaurus =

Wetlugasaurus Temporal range: Olenekian

Extinct genus of temnospondyls

Wetlugasaurus (meaning "Vetluga River lizard") is an extinct genus of temnospondyl from the Early Triassic (Olenekian) Charkabozh, Kzylsaiskaya, Petropavlovka, Kamennyi Yar and Vetluga Series Formations of northern Russia and Greenland. It had a 22 centimetres (8.7 in) long skull, and reached a total length of 1 metre (3 ft 3 in).

== Phylogeny ==
Wetlugasaurus in a cladogram after Novikov (2018) with only Early Triassic Eastern Europe taxa included:

- Temnospondyli
  - Luzocephalus
  - - Capitosauridae
      - - Samarabatrachus
        - - Poryolosuchus
          - Parotosuchus
      - - Selenocara
        - - Wetlugasaurus
          - Vladlenosaurus
    - - Qantas
      - - Trematosauridae
          - Prothoosuchus
          - - Thoosuchus
            - - Trematotegmen
              - - Angusaurus
                - - Inflectosaurus
                  - Trematosaurus
        - - Syrtosuchus
          - - Benthosuchus
            - - Yarengiidae
                - Vyborosaurus
                - Yarengia
