= Tertremoides =

Tertremoides Temporal range: Lower Triassic

Scientific classification
- Kingdom: Animalia
- Phylum: Chordata
- Clade: Tetrapoda
- Order: †Temnospondyli
- Suborder: †Stereospondyli
- Family: †Trematosauridae
- Subfamily: †Trematosaurinae
- Genus: †Tertremoides; Lehman, 1979

Type species
- †T. ambilobensis Lehman, 1979

Extinct genus of amphibians

Tertremoides is an extinct genus of trematosaurian temnospondyl within the family Trematosauridae from Madagascar. It was first named by Lehman, J-P. in 1966 as Trematosaurus madagascariensis but renamed to Tertremoides ambilobensis by Lehman in 1979. Its closest relative was Trematolestes.

Below is a cladogram showing the phylogenetic position of Tertremoides, from Schoch (2006):

- - Thoosuchus
  - - Trematosaurus
    - - - Platystega
        - Lyrocephaliscus
      - - Tertrema
        - - - Trematolestes
            - Tertremoides
          - Lonchorhynchinae
            - Wantzosaurus
            - - Aphaneramma
              - Cosgriffius

== See also ==
- Prehistoric amphibian
- List of prehistoric amphibians
