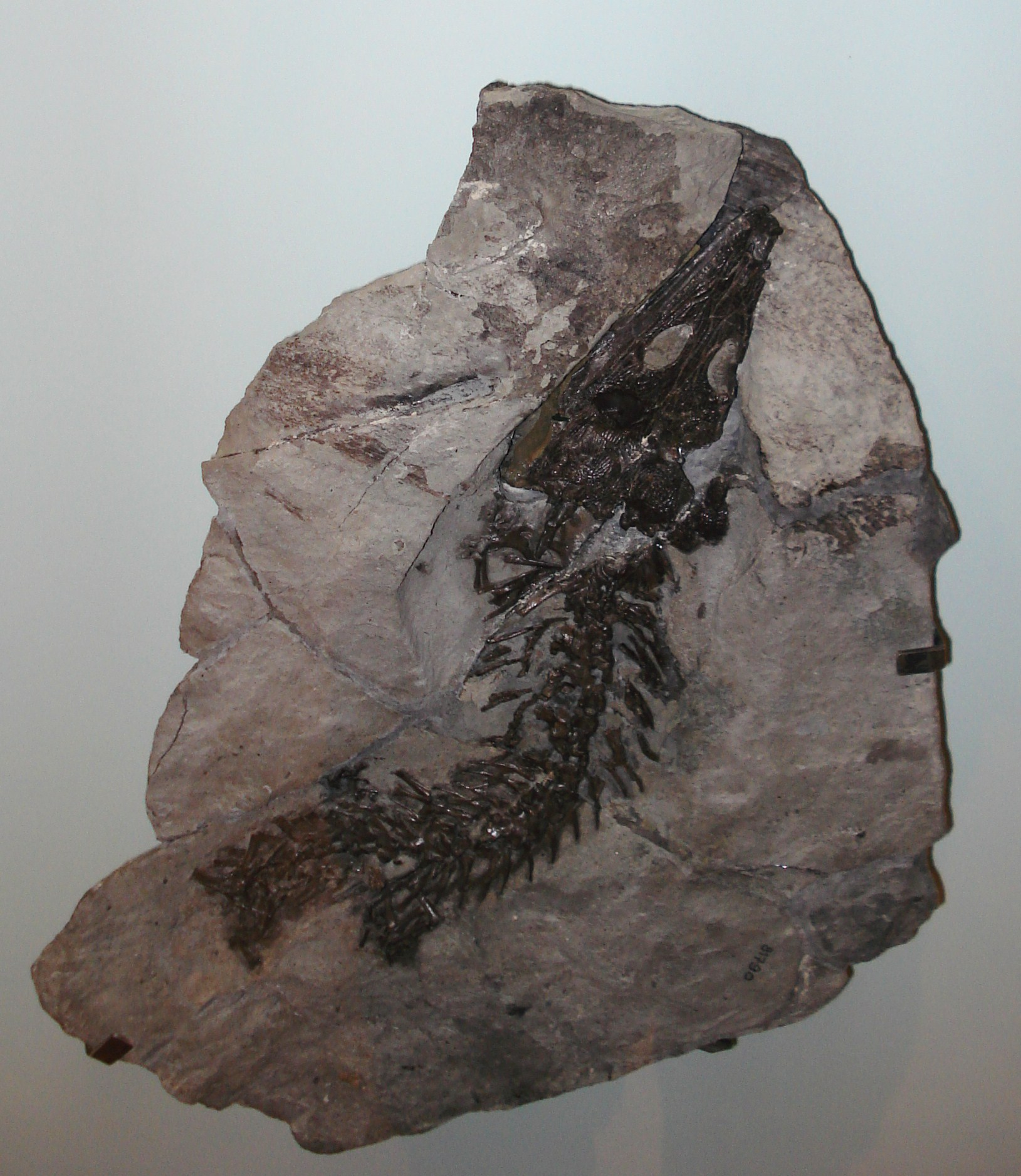
- Fossil, Staatliches Museum für Naturkunde Stuttgart

Scientific classification
- Domain: Eukaryota
- Kingdom: Animalia
- Phylum: Chordata
- Order: †Temnospondyli
- Suborder: †Stereospondyli
- Family: †Trematosauridae
- Subfamily: †Trematosaurinae
- Genus: †Trematolestes; Schoch, 2006

Type species
- †T. hagdorni Schoch, 2006

= Trematolestes =

Trematolestes Temporal range: Middle Triassic

Extinct genus of amphibians

Trematolestes is an extinct genus of temnospondyl amphibian from the Lower Keuper (Ladinian, Middle Triassic) of southern Germany. It was first named by Rainer R. Schoch in 2006 and the type species is Trematolestes hagdorni. It is the first trematosaurid represented by a nearly complete skeleton.

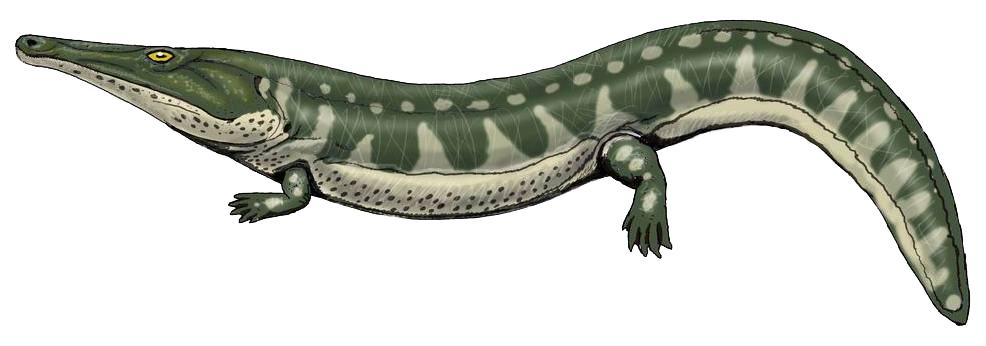
Restoration

Below is a cladogram showing the phylogenetic position of Trematolestes, from Schoch (2006):

- - Thoosuchus
  - - Trematosaurus
    - - - Platystega
        - Lyrocephaliscus
      - - Tertrema
        - - - Trematolestes
            - Tertremoides
          - Lonchorhynchinae
            - Wantzosaurus
            - - Aphaneramma
              - Cosgriffius
