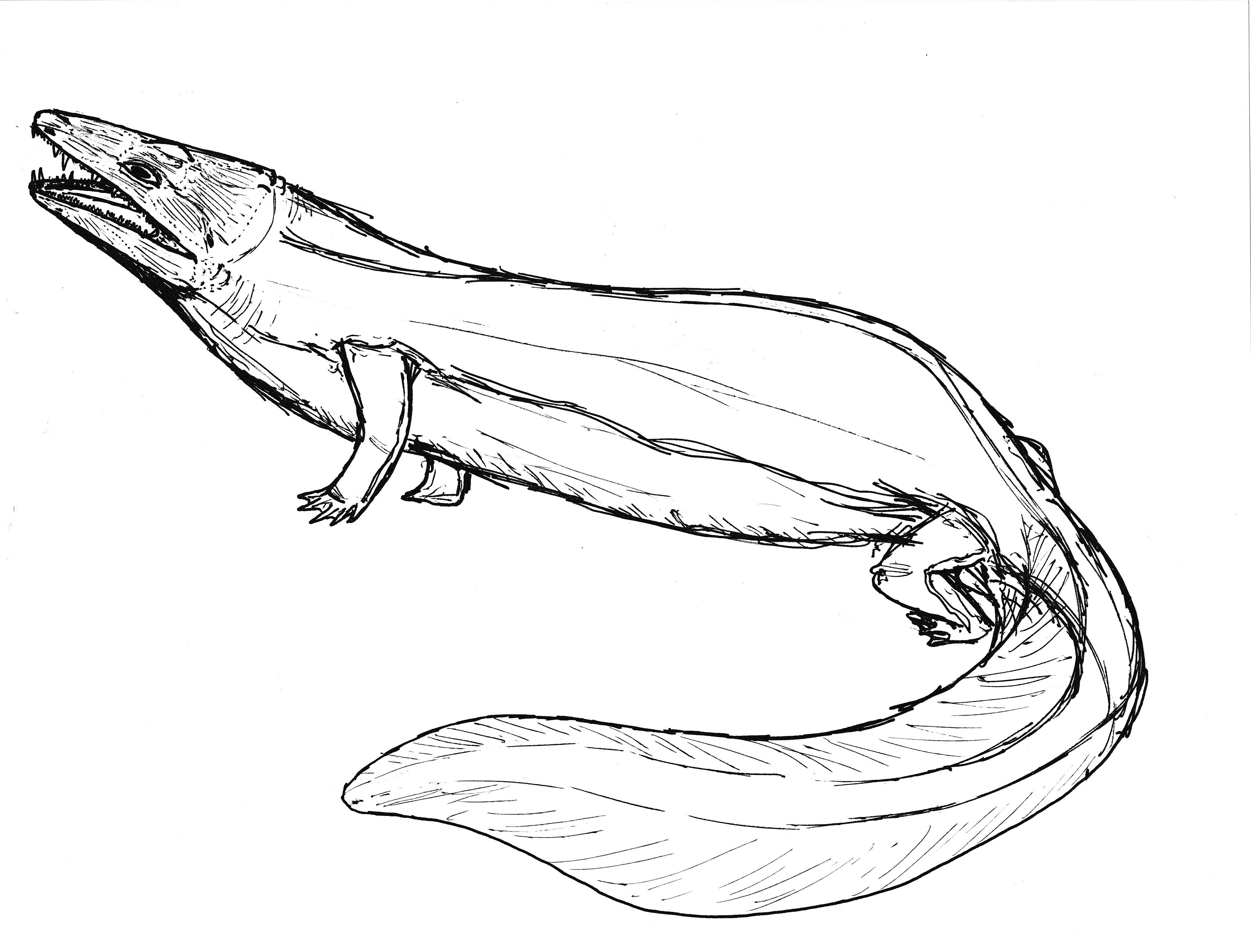

Scientific classification
- Kingdom: Animalia
- Phylum: Chordata
- Clade: Tetrapoda
- Order: †Temnospondyli
- Suborder: †Stereospondyli
- Family: †Trematosauridae
- Subfamily: †Trematosaurinae
- Genus: †Trematosuchus; Watson, 1919

Type species
- †Trematosaurus sobeyi Haughton, 1915

= Trematosuchus =

Extinct genus of amphibians

Trematosuchus is an extinct genus of trematosaurian temnospondyl within the family Trematosauridae from South Africa. The type species was first named by Haughton in 1915 as Trematosaurus sobeyi. It was assigned to its own genus, Trematosuchus, by D.M.S. Watson in 1919.

== Classification ==
Below is a cladogram from Steyer (2002) showing the phylogenetic relationships of trematosaurids:

- Trematosauridae
  - Trematosaurinae
    - - Tertrema
      - - Lyrocephaliscus
        - Platystega
    - - Luzocephalus
      - - Trematosaurus
        - Trematosuchus
  - Lonchorhynchinae
    - Aphaneramma
    - - Erythrobatrachus
      - Cosgriffius
      - - Stoschiosaurus
        - Wantzosaurus

== See also ==
- Prehistoric amphibian
- List of prehistoric amphibians
