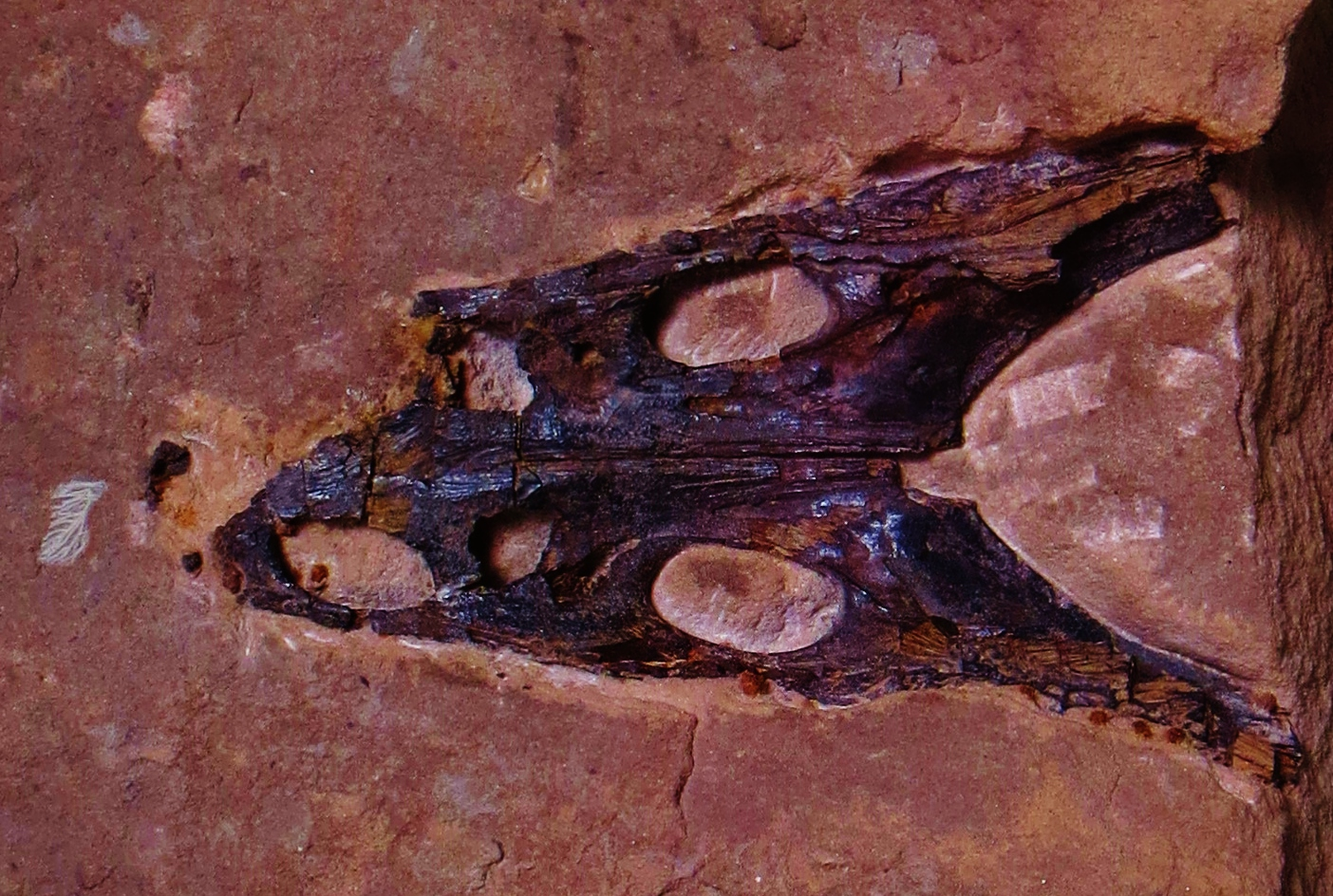
- T. brauni skull

Scientific classification
- Kingdom: Animalia
- Phylum: Chordata
- Clade: Tetrapoda
- Order: †Temnospondyli
- Suborder: †Stereospondyli
- Family: †Trematosauridae
- Subfamily: †Trematosaurinae
- Genus: †Trematosaurus; Burmeister, 1849

Species
- †T. brauni Burmeister, 1849 (type); †T. thuringiensis Werneburg, 1993; †T. galae Novikov, 2010

= Trematosaurus =

Trematosaurus Temporal range: Early Triassic, ~251.902–246.7 Ma

Extinct genus of amphibians

Trematosaurus is an extinct genus of trematosaurid temnospondyl amphibian found in Germany and Russia. It was first named by Hermann Burmeister in 1849 and the type species is Trematosaurus brauni.

== History of study ==
Trematosaurus was one of the first temnospondyls to be described. The type locality, called Merkel's Quarry, is in east-central Germany at Bernburg an der Saale within the Bausandstein (Olenekian) and was collected for several decades from the 1840s into the early 20th century, producing extensive cranial remains, although the majority of these are preserved as internal molds (steinkerns) or natural molds. The name Trematosaurus was in fact coined in 1842 by Carl von Braun, a frequent collector who used the Greek suffix trema ('hole') in reference to the pineal foramen to form the generic epithet, but as he provided no formal description, the name was not considered valid until the work of Burmeister, who named the type species after Braun. Burmeister's work was largely reconstructive and frequently omitted references to which specimens were being described, and as a result, it remains unknown which specimens exactly were covered in his description. This was remedied by subsequent workers who provided specimen illustrations for material reposited at numerous museums across Europe. However, the complete osteology and ontogeny of this taxon remained poorly documented until the work of Schoch (2019).

Two other species were described from equivalent horizons in Thuringia, T. fuchsi and T. thuringiensis. Trematosaurus fuchsi is widely regarded as a junior synonym of T. brauni, while T. thuringiensis is tentatively considered to be valid with the caveat that poor preservation of the single specimen may account for some of the purported differences. Trematosaurus madagascariensis was synonymized with Tertremoides ambilobensis from the same horizon in Madagascar by Schoch & Milner (2000), with the species epithet of the former (named first) taking precedence by priority and the genus epithet of the latter taking precedence by distinction from Trematosaurus. Trematosaurus sobeyi from Cynognathus Assemblage Zone of South Africa was placed in the novel genus Trematosuchus by Watson (1919). Trematosaurus kannemeyeri from the same zone is thought to belong to Aphaneramma, but other workers do not consider it to be diagnostic and thus to be invalid. Trematosaurus yakovlevi from Russia was placed in the novel genus Thoosuchus by Efremov (1940). Trematosaurus weidenbaumi was first removed to Thoosuchus and then placed in the novel genus Angusaurus by Getmanov (1989). Various reports of Trematosaurus sp. from Russia belong to Inflectosaurus, but Trematosaurus galae is a recently described Russian species that remains valid to date.

== Description ==
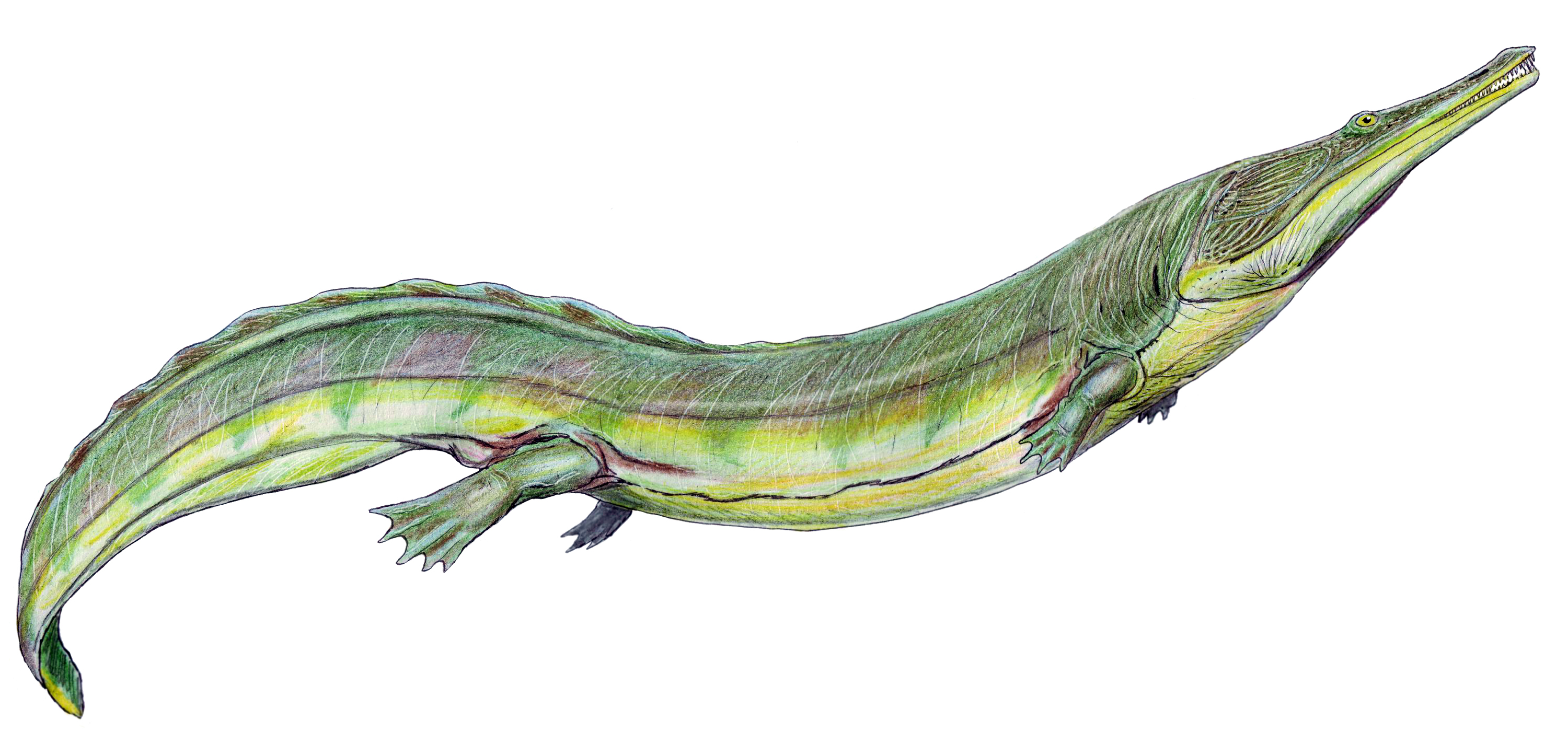
T. brauni

The overwhelming majority of specimens of T. brauni are partial to complete skulls, with 75 such specimens known (size range from 10.9 to 41 cm in length). Postcrania are restricted to the clavicle and interclavicle, two large plate-like elements of the pectoral girdle. In part, this relates to the occurrence of other large stereospondyls at the type locality such as the capitosaur Parotosuchus nasutus, but postcrania are generally scarce, which may be due to either collection bias or taphonomic bias. Therefore, all diagnostic features of T. brauni are based on the skull. Autapomorphies include (1) temporal sulcus of lateral line with two portions, (2) occipital sulcus continuous, (3) pre-orbital region slightly shorter than half skull length (0.43–0.49), and (4) interorbital distance wide (interorbital distance/ skull length: 0.15–0.2). The description is based only on referred specimens, as no holotype was ever designated and the syntypes described by Burmeister cannot be identified based on the scant details of his description; however, because they may exist, either within public or private collections, no neotype designation is warranted at present. Trematosaurus galae differs from T. brauni in (1) presence of well-pronounced lacrimal and zygomatic flexures of canals of the lateral line, (2) connection of both branches of the temporal groove at the ossification center of the supratemporal, and (3) in the presence of a supplementary groove (sulcus buccalis transversus) on the squamosal. The more questionably valid T. thuringiensis differs only in having larger orbits and a narrower skull table than the type species.

Given the large sample size of T. brauni, its ontogeny can be characterized, exhibiting features such as decreased orbit size and skull width but not other features such as broadening of the interorbital region or increased preorbital length, which occur in other temnospondyls. Observations of more fragmentary material of T. galae indicate that specifically the prenarial region and the postorbital regions become longer, along with increased development of other features such as the basioccipital and ornamentation on the parasphenoid replacing a shagreen of denticles.

== Classification ==
Below is a cladogram from Steyer (2002) showing the phylogenetic relationships of trematosaurids:

- Trematosauridae
  - Trematosaurinae
    - - Tertrema
      - - Lyrocephaliscus
        - Platystega
    - - Luzocephalus
      - - Trematosaurus
        - Trematosuchus
  - Lonchorhynchinae
    - Aphaneramma
    - - Erythrobatrachus
      - Cosgriffius
      - - Stoschiosaurus
        - Wantzosaurus

Trematosaurus in a cladogram after Novikov (2018) with only Early Triassic Eastern Europe taxa included:

- Trematosauridae
  - Prothoosuchus
  - - Thoosuchus
    - - Trematotegmen
      - - Angusaurus
        - - Inflectosaurus
          - Trematosaurus
