= Hyperokynodon =

Hyperokynodon Temporal range: Carnian

Scientific classification
- Kingdom: Animalia
- Phylum: Chordata
- Clade: Tetrapoda
- Order: †Temnospondyli
- Suborder: †Stereospondyli
- Family: †Trematosauridae
- Genus: †Hyperokynodon; Plieninger, 1852

Species
- H. keuperinus Plieninger, 1852 (type)

Extinct genus of amphibians

Hyperokynodon is an extinct genus of trematosaurian temnospondyl within the family Trematosauridae. Fossils have been found in Germany. While most trematosaurids existed during the Early Triassic, Hyperokynodon has been found in Late Triassic deposits, making it the youngest known trematosaurid. Hyperokynodon was known since 1852, but it was not identified as a trematosaurid until 1987. The type and only species is H. keuperinus.

== Description ==
Hyperokynodon is known only from two specimens: a holotype snout and a cast of the underside of the skull roof. The holotype was found in Heilbronn, Germany, in the mid-1800s. It likely came from deposits in the Wartberg, a mountain that had several active quarries at the time. The cast, known as SMNS 55910, was found in a sandstone quarry east of the city of Heilbronn. SMNS 55910 is an impression of the underside of the skull table and includes parts of the palate and the edge of the orbit.

Based on the cast, the total skull length is estimated to have been around 80 centimetres (31 in). The total body length based on related trematosaurs is estimated to have been 2.8 metres (9.2 ft) to 3.2 metres (10 ft). Like other trematosaurids, Hyperokynodon has a narrow skull. The back portion, however, is unusually narrow, approaching that of Cosgriffius, a lonchorhynchine trematosaurid with a very narrow skull. The snout is moderately elongated with a wide tip. The anterior palatal openings, two holes at the front of the palate, are widely spaced. The vomerine and palatal fangs, two sets of teeth on the roof of the mouth, are very large and laterally compressed. Hyperokynodon shares several characteristics with the related Tertrema, such as the absence of teeth between the choanae.

== Classification ==
The fragmentary nature of specimens belonging to Hyperokynodon has led to difficulty in classification. The genus was placed in the capitosaur family Mastodonsauroidea for many decades. In 1987, it was given a more specific classification as a tertremine trematosaurid.

German paleontologist Eberhard Fraas referred SMNS 55910 to the metoposaur Metopias in 1889. Schoch et al. (2002) considered the cast to belong to H. keuperinus because it was the only other trematosaurid known from Heilbronn. Schoch et al. also raised the possibility that it was a lonchorhynchine, which would imply that both the lonchorhynchine and tertremine lineages survived into the Late Triassic. Schoch et al. considered the cast to belong to a tertremine, however, because of its large size and distinctive features.

== See also ==
- List of prehistoric amphibians
