= Platystega =

Scientific classification
- Kingdom: Animalia
- Phylum: Chordata
- Clade: Tetrapoda
- Order: †Temnospondyli
- Suborder: †Stereospondyli
- Family: †Trematosauridae
- Subfamily: †Trematosaurinae
- Genus: †Platystega; Wiman, 1915

Type species
- †P. depressa Wiman, 1915

Extinct genus of amphibians

Platystega is an extinct genus of trematosaurian temnospondyl within the family Trematosauridae.

== Classification ==
Below is a cladogram from Steyer (2002) showing the phylogenetic relationships of trematosaurids:

- Trematosauridae
  - Trematosaurinae
    - - Tertrema
      - - Lyrocephaliscus
        - Platystega
    - - Luzocephalus
      - - Trematosaurus
        - Trematosuchus
  - Lonchorhynchinae
    - Aphaneramma
    - - Erythrobatrachus
      - Cosgriffius
      - - Stoschiosaurus
        - Wantzosaurus

== See also ==
- Prehistoric amphibian
- List of prehistoric amphibians
