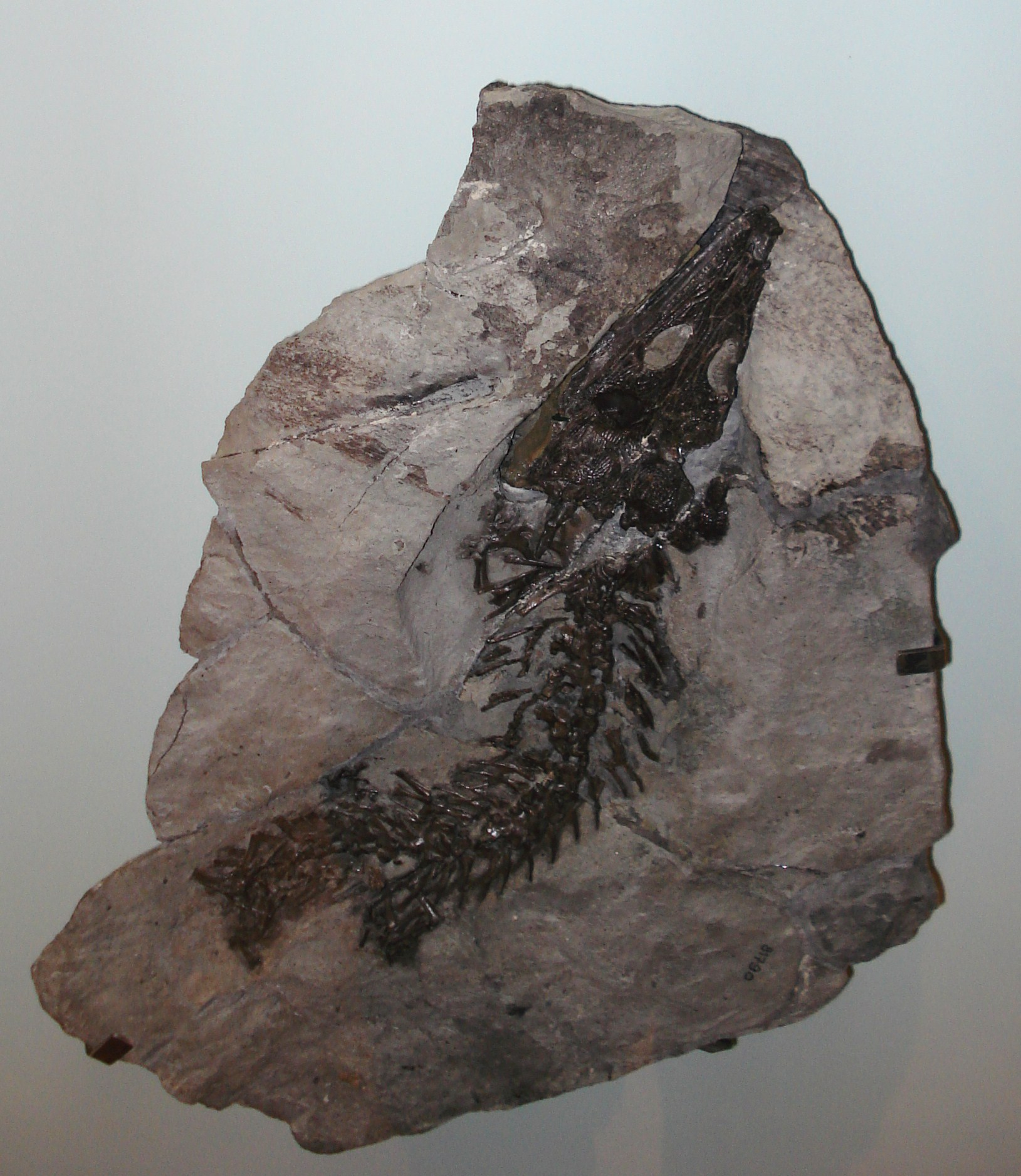
- Fossil of Trematolestes hagdorni in the State Museum of Natural History Stuttgart

Scientific classification
- Domain: Eukaryota
- Kingdom: Animalia
- Phylum: Chordata
- Order: †Temnospondyli
- Suborder: †Stereospondyli
- Family: †Trematosauridae
- Subfamily: †Trematosaurinae; Watson, 1919

= Trematosaurinae =

Trematosaurinae Temporal range: Triassic

Extinct subfamily of amphibians

Trematosaurinae is a subfamily of temnospondyl amphibians within the family Trematosauridae. Like all trematosaurids, they were marine piscivores, resembling crocodiles in their general build. Unlike the long, almost gharial-like snouts of the Lonchorhynchinae, the Trematosaurinae had more "normal" crocodile-like skulls.

== Classification ==
Below is a cladogram from Steyer (2002) showing the phylogenetic relationships of trematosaurids:

- Trematosauridae
  - Trematosaurinae
    - - Tertrema
      - - Lyrocephaliscus
        - Platystega
    - - Luzocephalus
      - - Trematosaurus
        - Trematosuchus
  - Lonchorhynchinae
    - Aphaneramma
    - - Erythrobatrachus
      - Cosgriffius
      - - Stoschiosaurus
        - Wantzosaurus
