= Blina Shale =

Australian geological formation

- Stratigraphic range: Early Triassic (Induan–Olenekian) 251.902–246.7 Ma
- Type: Geological formation
- Underlies: Erskine Sandstone
- Thickness: 650–1,000 m (2,130–3,280 ft)

Lithology
- Primary: Shale
- Other: Sand

Location
- Coordinates: 17°46′S 124°32′E
- Region: Western Australia
- Country: Australia
- Extent: Canning Basin
- Blina Shale (Australia) Blina Shale (Western Australia)

Blina Shale is a fossiliferous geological formation located in the Canning Basin in the Kimberley region of North West Australia. Its strata date back to the Induan–Olenekian ages of the Early Triassic.

The first extensive survey was undertaken by a collaboration between the University of California, represented by Charles Camp and his undergraduate John Cosgriff, and the Western Australian Museum and University team of David Ride, Duncan Merrilees and K. G. McKenzie.

== Geology ==
The site is located near Derby, Western Australia. The shale bed extends inland from King Sound at the coast, forming claypans where it is rarely exposed, with exploratory drilling indicating it is between 650 and 1,000 metres (2,130 and 3,280 ft) thick. The upper parts of the bed are finer layers sediments; these are evident in some ridges of the Erskine range. Outcrops are rather rare, and no type section described, as the formation is only known via infillings within loy-lying synclinal areas, which have not been dissected to any depth suitable for measurement. Outside of drilling, the greatest thickness in any of the localities is 3–6.1 metres (9.8–20.0 ft). It is because of these factors that it is often impossible to deduce which layer of a regular section the beds belong, as these beds are usually isolated exposures. The drilling logs previously recorded are useless in establishing standard sections, because these logs are not detailed enough for precise work.

Despite its name, the Blina Shale is not in fact entirely shale, however predominant the ferruginous shale rock is. Some of the basal beds, (not exactly the oldest of the formation) located along the boundary of the synclinal deposition basins comprise of Isaura coquinites. Even more intriguing, a bone bed which may be approximately 3 metres (9.8 ft) is known from these outcrops. Younger beds are often quite sandy and still possess phosphatic intercalation, however these lack bone beds. It is this more sandy composition of the Isaura shales which were given the name "Wonjil Shale", however there is no clear division between the two lithological types, and both hold a similar fossil fauna, and thus the term "Wonjil Shale" is a synonym of Blina Shale.

== Paleobiota ==
Discoveries at the site include the actinopterygian Saurichthys; the dipnoans Aphelodus anapes, Arganodus and Ceratodus; the temnospondyls Batrachosuchus henwoodi, Deltasaurus kimberleyensis, the large Erythrobatrachus noonkanbahensis, the long-snouted Aphaneramma, and Warrenisuchus aliciae, which is also known from the Arcadia Formation.

=== Fishes ===
Fishes of the Blina Shale
Genus	Species	Clade	Images
Aphelodus	A. anapes	Dipnoi, Sagenodontidae	
Arganodus	A. cf. tiguidensis	Ceratodontiformes, Arganodontidae	Reconstruction of Arganodus.
Ceratodus	C. cf. phillipsi	Ceratodontiformes, Ceratodontidae	Painting of a generalized Ceratodus.
Saurichthys	S. sp.	Saurichthyiformes, Saurichthyidae	The related Saurichthys seefeldensis attacking a hapless Preondactylus buffarinii.

=== Temnospondyli ===
Temnospondyls of the Blina Shale
Genus	Species	Clade	Images
Aphaneramma	cf. A. sp.	Temnospondyli, Trematosauridae	Restoration of A. sp.
Batrachosuchus	B. henwoodi	Temnospondyli, Brachyopidae	Restoration of B. watsoni.
Deltasaurus	D. kimberleyensis	Temnospondyli, Rhytidosteidae	Life restoration of D. kimberleyensis.
Erythrobatrachus	E. noonkanbahensis	Temnospondyli, Trematosauridae	
Warrenisuchus	W. aliciae (Formerly Parotosuchus aliciae)	Temnospondyli, Capitosauria	Warrenisuchus ontogenesis.
