= Kudanga =

Kudanga Куданга
- Village
- Location within Vologda Oblast Location within Russia
- Coordinates: 59°17′N 45°16′E
- Country: Russia
- Region: Vologda Oblast
- District: Nikolsky District
- Time zone: UTC+3:00

Kudanga (Russian: Куданга) is a rural locality (a village) in Permasskoye Rural Settlement, Nikolsky District, Vologda Oblast, Russia. The population was 25 as of 2002.

== Geography ==
Kudanga is located 53 km southwest of Nikolsk (the district's administrative centre) by road. Kalauz is the nearest rural locality.

== Paleontology ==
Fossils of the Early Triassic temnospondyls were found in Kudanga. Two specimens of Wetlugasaurus and one specimen of indeterminate trematosaurid were discovered in the Lower Olenekian deposits.
