= Neospathodus =

Neospathodus Temporal range: Olenekian

Scientific classification
- Kingdom: Animalia
- Phylum: Chordata
- Infraphylum: Agnatha
- Class: †Conodonta
- Order: †Ozarkodinida
- Family: †Gondolellidae
- Genus: †Neospathodus (Huckriede, 1958)

Species
- †Neospathodus abruptus; †Neospathodus arcus; †Neospathodus brevissimus; †Neospathodus brochus; †Neospathodus clinatus; †Neospathodus concavus; †Neospathodus crassatus; †Neospathodus cristagalli (type); †Neospathodus curtatus; †Neospathodus dieneri; †Neospathodus gondolelloides; †Neospathodus homeri; †Neospathodus novaehollandiae; †Neospathodus pakistanensis; †Neospathodus planus; †Neospathodus posterolongatus; †Neospathodus pusillus; †Neospathodus spitiensis; †Neospathodus symmetricus; †Neospathodus triangularis; †Neospathodus waageni

Extinct genus of jawless fishes

Neospathodus is an extinct genus of conodonts.

== Use in stratigraphy ==
The base of the Olenekian stage of the Early Triassic is at the lowest occurrence of Neospathodus waageni. It is defined as ending near the lowest occurrences of Chiosella timorensis.

The GSSP Candidate sections are in the Mud (Muth) village in the Spiti valley, India or in Chaohu, China.
