= Olenekian =

Age in the Early Triassic epoch

Coordinates: 31.9653°N 78.0247°E

- 249.9 – 246.7 Ma
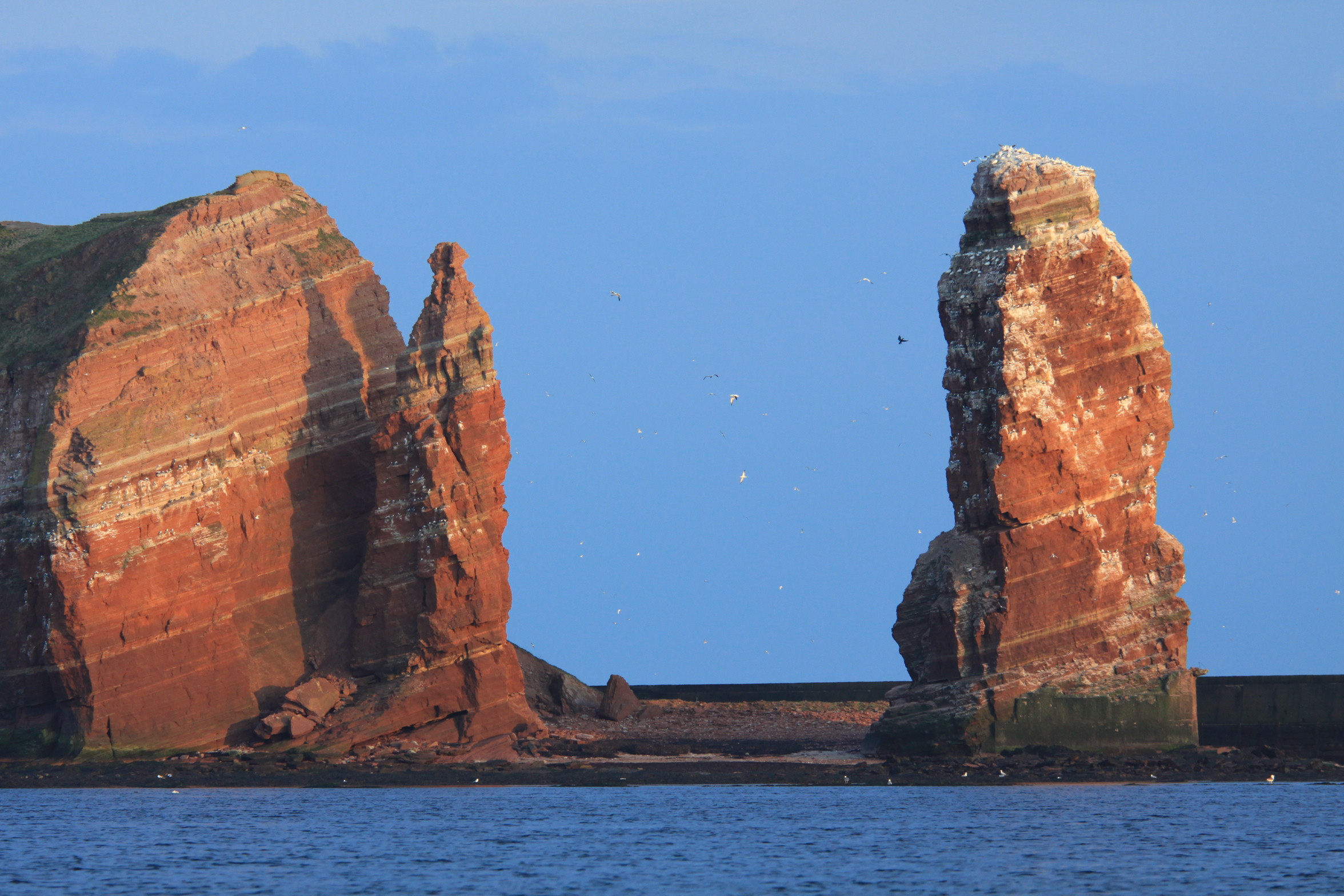
- Olenekian Buntsandstein in Heligoland, Germany

Chronology
| ← / Triassic–Jurassic extinction event; ← / Scleractinian corals & calcified sponges; ← / Carnian pluvial episode; ← / Manicouagan impact; ← / Coals return; ← / Full recovery of woody trees; ← / Smithian–Spathian boundary event; ← / Permian-Triassic extinction event |
Subdivision of the Triassic according to the ICS, as of 2024. Vertical axis scale: Millions of years ago

Etymology
- Name formality: Formal

Usage information
- Celestial body: Earth
- Regional usage: Global (ICS)
- Time scale(s) used: ICS Time Scale

Definition
- Chronological unit: Age
- Stratigraphic unit: Stage
- Time span formality: Formal
- Lower boundary definition: Not formally defined
- Lower boundary definition candidates: FAD of the Conodont Neospathodus waageni
- Lower boundary GSSP candidate section(s): Mud (Muth) village, Spiti valley, India
- Upper boundary definition: Not formally defined
- Upper boundary definition candidates: FAD of the Conodont Chiosella timorensis; Base of magnetic zone MT1n
- Upper boundary GSSP candidate section(s): Desli Caira, Northern Dobruja, Romania; Guandao, Guizhou, China

In the geologic timescale, the Olenekian is an age in the Early Triassic epoch; in chronostratigraphy, it is a stage in the Lower Triassic series. It spans the time between 250.8 Ma and 247 Ma (million years ago). The Olenekian is sometimes divided into the Smithian and the Spathian subages or substages. The Olenekian follows the Induan and is followed by the Anisian (Middle Triassic).

The Olenekian saw the deposition of a large part of the Buntsandstein in Europe. The Olenekian is roughly coeval with the regional Yongningzhenian Stage used in China.

== Stratigraphic definitions ==
The Olenekian Stage was introduced into scientific literature by Russian stratigraphers in 1956. The stage is named after Olenëk in Siberia. Before the subdivision in Olenekian and Induan became established, both stages formed the Scythian Stage, which has since disappeared from the official timescale.

The base of the Olenekian is at the lowest occurrence of the ammonoids Hedenstroemia or Meekoceras gracilitatis, and of the conodont Neospathodus waageni. It is defined as ending near the lowest occurrences of genera Japonites, Paradanubites, and Paracrochordiceras; and of the conodont Chiosella timorensis. A GSSP (global reference profile for the base) has not been established as of December 2020.

In the 1960s, English paleontologist Edward T. Tozer (sometimes collaborating with American geologist Norman J. Silberling) crafted Triassic timescales based on North American ammonoid zones, further refining it in the following decades. Tozer's nomenclature was largely derived from Mojsisovics's work, who coined most of the Triassic stages and substages, but he redefined them using North American sites. He recommended the Lower Triassic series be divided into the Griesbachian, Dienerian, Smithian, and Spathian. The latter two roughly correspond with the Olenekian. Tozer's timescale became popular in the Americas. He named the Smithian after Smith Creek on Ellesmere Island, Canada (the creek itself is named after geologist J. P. Smith). The Smithian is defined by the Arctoceras bloomstrandi ammonoid zone (contains Euflemingites romunderi and Juvenites crassus) and the overlying Meekoceras gracilitatis and Wasatchites tardus subzones. He named the Spathian after Spath Creek on Ellesmere Island (this creek is named after geologist L. F. Spath), and defined it by the Procolumbites subrobustus ammonoid zone.

== Olenekian life ==
Life was still recovering from the severe end-Permian mass extinction. During the Olenekian, the flora changed from lycopod-dominated (e.g. Pleuromeia) to gymnosperm- and pteridophyte-dominated. These vegetation changes were due to global changes in temperature and precipitation. Conifers (gymnosperms) were the dominant plants during most of the Mesozoic. Among land vertebrates, the archosaurs - a group of diapsid reptiles encompassing crocodiles, pterosaurs, dinosaurs, and ultimately birds - first evolved from archosauriform ancestors during the Olenekian. This group includes ferocious predators like Erythrosuchus.

In the oceans, microbial reefs were common during the Early Triassic, possibly due to lack of competition with metazoan reef builders as a result of the extinction. However, transient metazoan reefs reoccurred during the Olenekian wherever permitted by environmental conditions. Ammonoids and conodonts diversified, but both suffered losses during the Smithian-Spathian boundary extinction (see below) at the end of the Smithian subage.

Ray-finned fishes largely remained unaffected by the Permian-Triassic extinction event. Coelacanths show their highest post-Devonian diversity during the Early Triassic. Many fish genera show a cosmopolitan distribution during the Induan and Olenekian, such as Australosomus, Birgeria, Parasemionotidae, Pteronisculus, Ptycholepidae, Saurichthys and Whiteia. This is well exemplified in the Griesbachian (early Induan) aged fish assemblages of the Wordie Creek Formation (East Greenland), the Dienerian (late Induan) aged assemblages of the Middle Sakamena Formation (Madagascar), Candelaria Formation (Nevada, United States), and Mikin Formation (Himachal Pradesh, India), and Daye Formation (Guizhou, China), and the Smithian aged assemblages of the Vikinghøgda Formation (Spitsbergen, Norway), and Thaynes Group (western United States), and Helongshan Formation (Anhui, China), and several Early Triassic layers of the Sulphur Mountain Formation (western Canada). Ray-finned fishes diversified after the mass extinction and reached peak diversity during the Middle Triassic. This diversification is, however, obscured by a taphonomic megabias (Spathian-Bithynian Gap, SBG) during the late Olenekian and early middle Anisian. The earliest large durophagous neopterygian is known from the SBG, suggesting an early onset of the Triassic actinopterygian revolution.

Olenekian chondrichthyan fishes include hybodonts and neoselachians, but also a few surviving lineages of eugeneodontid holocephalians and ctenacanthiformes, two mainly Palaeozoic groups that went extinct during the Early Triassic.

Marine temnospondyl amphibians, such as the superficially crocodile-shaped trematosaurids Aphaneramma and Wantzosaurus, show wide geographic ranges during the Induan and Olenekian ages. Their fossils are found in Greenland, Spitsbergen, Pakistan and Madagascar. Others, such as Trematosaurus, inhabited freshwater environments and were less widespread.

The first marine reptiles appeared during the Olenekian. Hupehsuchia, Ichthyopterygia and Sauropterygia are among the first marine reptiles to enter the scene (e.g. Cartorhynchus, Chaohusaurus, Utatsusaurus, Hupehsuchus, Grippia, Omphalosaurus, Corosaurus). Sauropterygians and ichthyosaurs ruled the oceans during the Mesozoic Era.

An example of an exceptionally diverse Early Triassic assemblage is the Paris biota, fossils of which were discovered near Paris, Idaho and other nearby sites in Idaho and Nevada. The Paris Biota was deposited in the wake of the SSBM and it features at least seven phyla and 20 distinct metazoan orders, including leptomitid protomonaxonid sponges (previously only known from the Paleozoic), thylacocephalans, crustaceans, nautiloids, ammonoids, coleoids, ophiuroids, crinoids, and vertebrates. Such diverse assemblages show that organisms diversified wherever and whenever climatic and environmental conditions ameliorated.

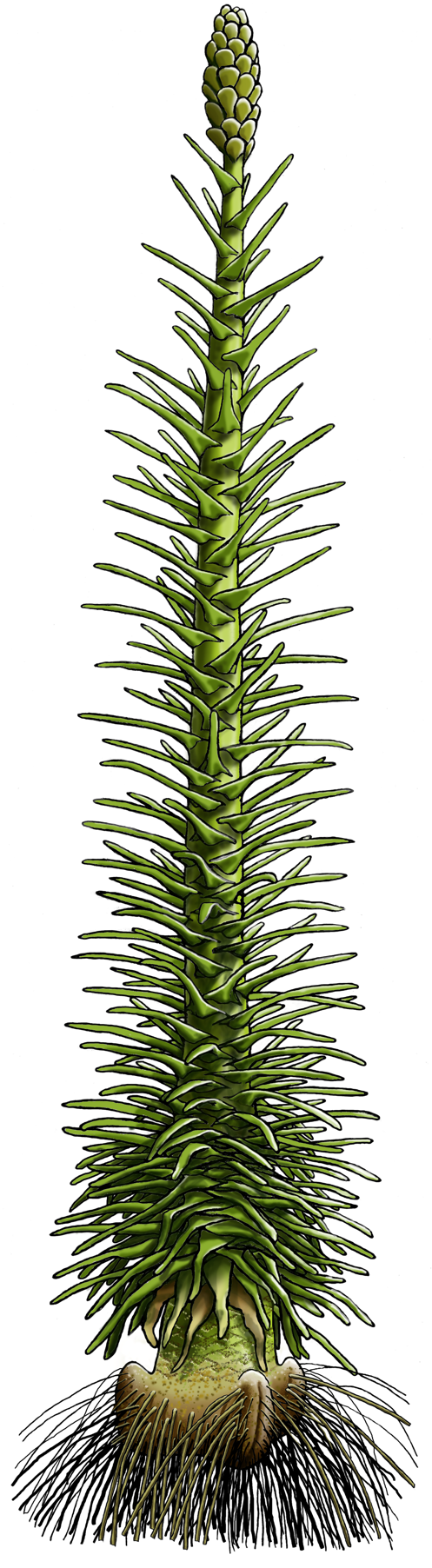
Life restoration of Pleuromeia, a genus of lycophyte that was globally abundant during the Olenekinian

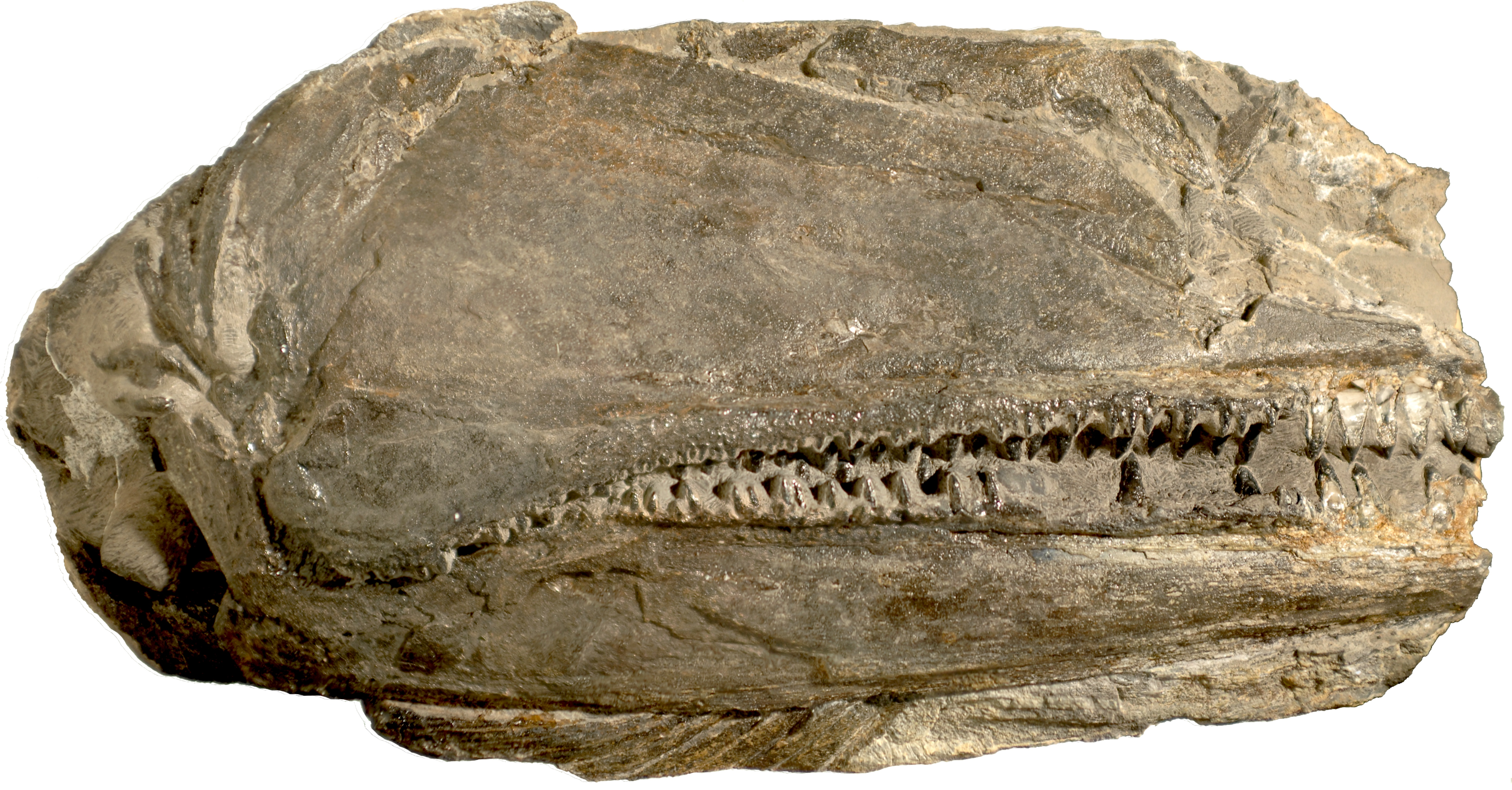
Skull of the ray-finned fish Birgeria americana

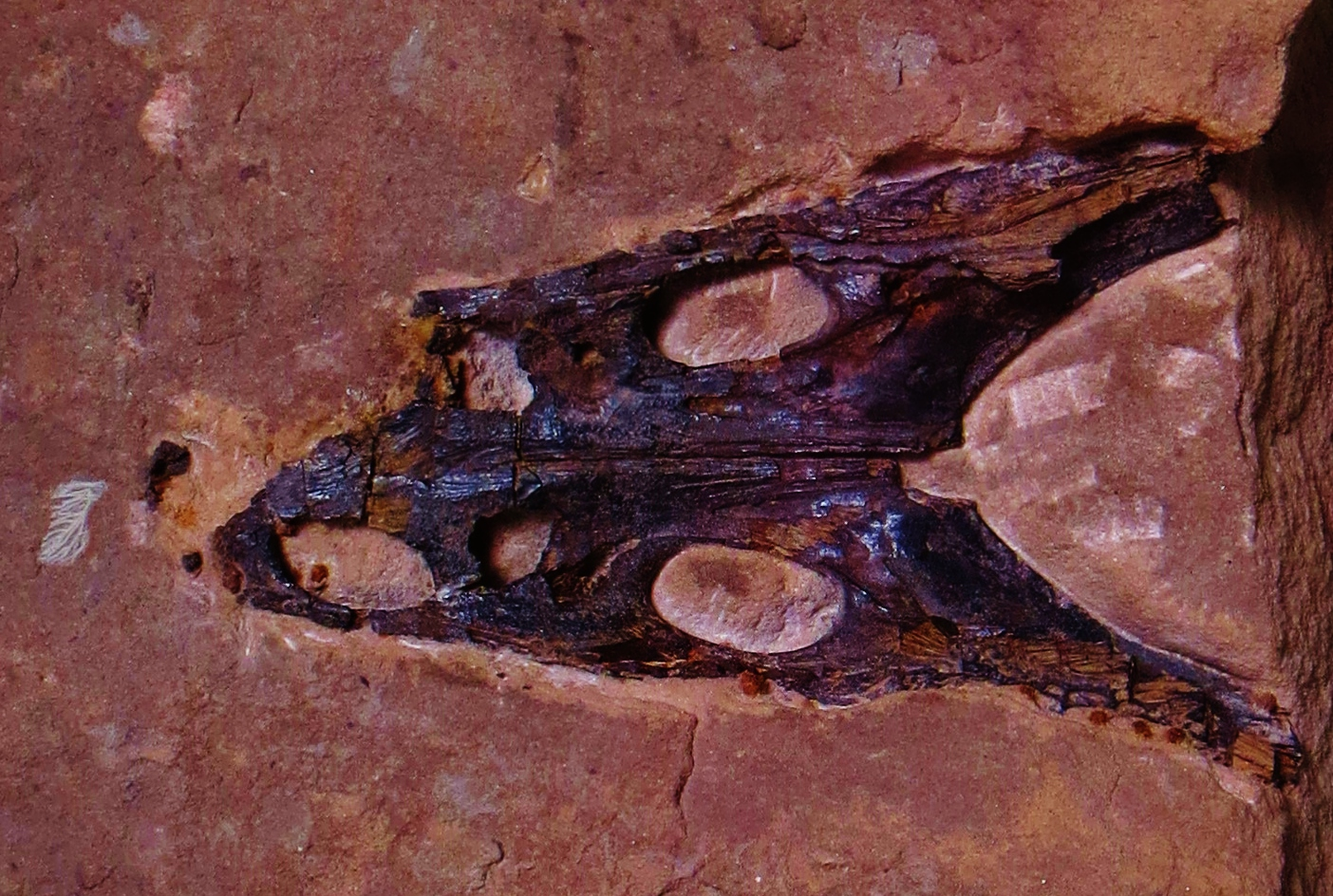
Skull of the temnospondyl amphibian Trematosaurus brauni

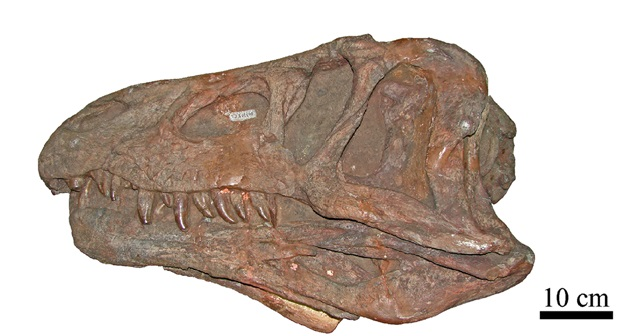
Skull of the archosauriform reptile Erythrosuchus africanus

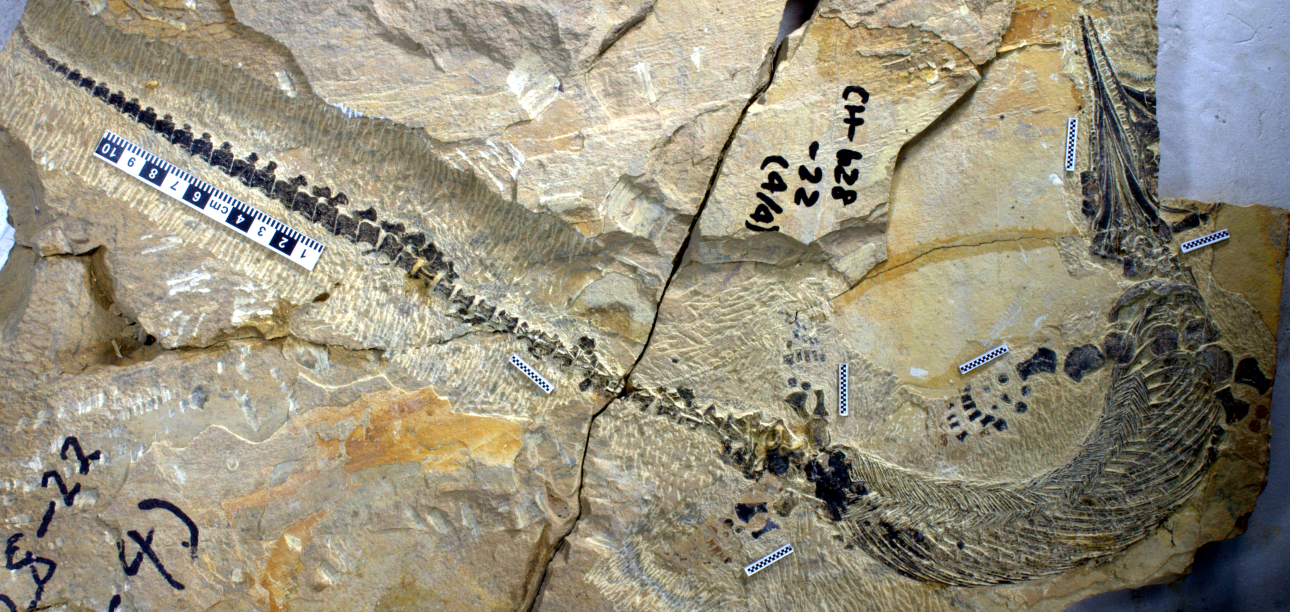
Marine ichthyosauromorph reptile Chaohusaurus

=== Smithian–Spathian boundary event ===
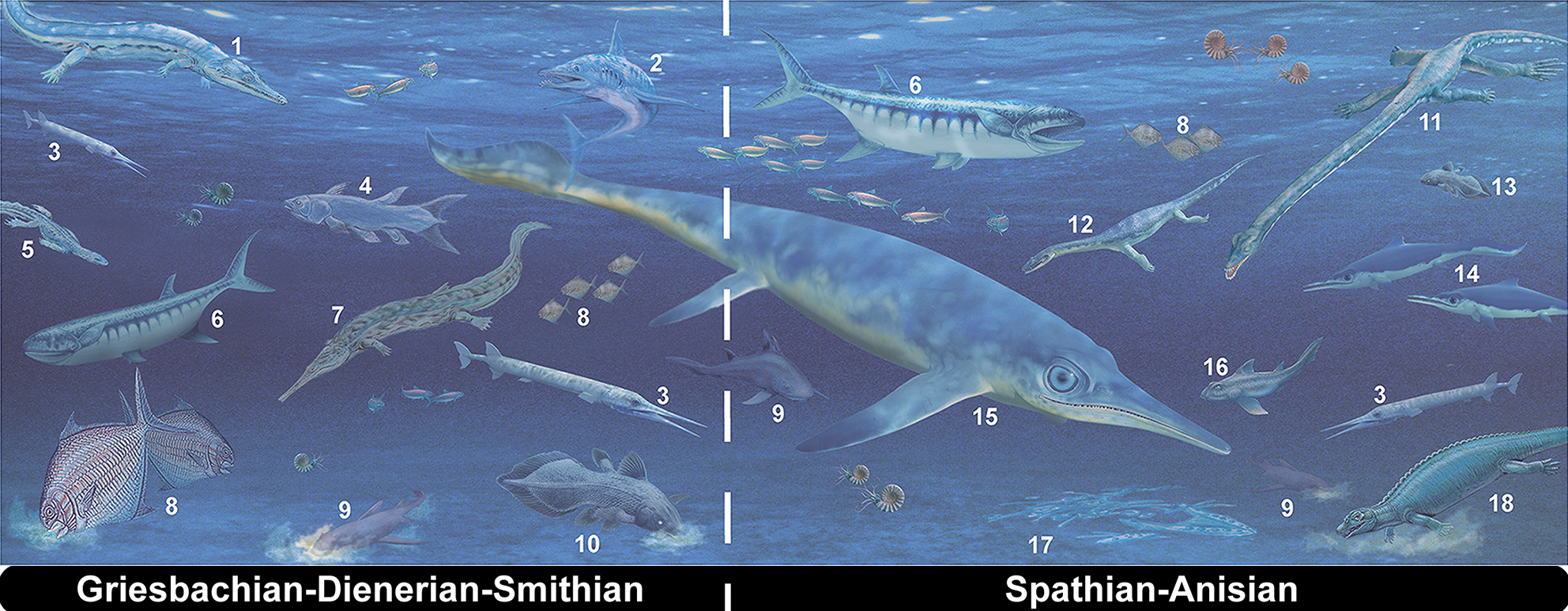
Early Triassic and Anisian marine predators: 1. Wantzosaurus, 2. Fadenia, 3. Saurichthys, 4. Rebellatrix, 5. Hovasaurus, 6. Birgeria, 7. Aphaneramma, 8. Bobasatrania, 9. Hybodontiformes, 10. Mylacanthus, 11. Tanystropheus, 12. Corosaurus, 13. Ticinepomis, 14. Mixosaurus, 15. Cymbospondylidae, 16. Neoselachii, 17. Omphalosaurus skeleton, 18. Placodus

An important extinction event occurred during the Olenekian age of the Early Triassic, near the subage boundary between the Smithian and Spathian. The main victims of this Smithian–Spathian boundary event, often called the Smithian–Spathian extinction, were the Paleozoic disaster taxa that survived the Permian–Triassic extinction event and flourished in the newly vacated niches during immediate aftermath of the Great Death; ammonoids, conodonts and radiolarians in particular suffered drastic biodiversity losses, which is accentuated, among others, by the cosmopolitan distribution of the ammonoid Anasibirites. Marine reptiles, such as ichthyopterygians and sauropterygians, diversified after the extinction.

The terrestrial flora was also affected significantly, changing from lycopod-dominated (e.g. Pleuromeia) during the Dienerian and Smithian subages to gymnosperm- and pteridophyte-dominated in the Spathian. These vegetation changes are due to global changes in temperature and precipitation. Conifers (gymnosperms) were the dominant plants during most of the Mesozoic. Until recently the existence of this extinction event about 249.4 Ma ago was not recognised.

The Smithian–Spathian boundary extinction was linked to late eruptions of the Siberian Traps, which released warming greenhouse gases, resulting in global warming and in acidification, both on land and in the ocean. A large spike in mercury concentrations relative to total organic carbon, much like during the Permian-Triassic extinction, has been suggested as another contributor to the extinction, although this is controversial and has been disputed by other research that suggests elevated mercury levels already existed by the middle Smithian. Prior to the Smithian-Spathian Boundary extinction event, a flat gradient of latitudinal species richness is observed, suggesting that warmer temperatures extended into higher latitudes, allowing extension of geographic ranges of species adapted to warmer temperatures, and displacement or extinctions of species adapted to cooler temperatures. Oxygen isotope studies on conodonts have revealed that temperatures rose in the first 2 million years of the Triassic, ultimately reaching sea surface temperatures of up to 40 °C (104 °F) in the tropics during the Smithian. The extinction itself occurred during a subsequent drop in global temperatures — ca. 8 °C (14 °F) over a geologically short period — in the latest Smithian; however, temperature alone cannot account for the Smithian-Spathian boundary extinction, because several factors were at play. An alternative explanation for the extinction event hypothesises the biotic crisis took place not at the Smithian-Spathian boundary but shortly before, during the Late Smithian Thermal Maximum (LSTM), with the Smithian-Spathian boundary itself being associated with cessation of intrusive magmatic activity of the Siberian Traps, along with significant global cooling, after which a gradual biotic recovery took place over the early and middle Spathian, along with a decline in continental weathering and a rejuvenation of ocean circulation.

In the ocean, many large and mobile species moved away from the tropics, but large fish remained, and amongst the immobile species such as molluscs, only the ones that could cope with the heat survived; half the bivalves disappeared. Conodonts decreased in average size as a result of the extinction. On land, the tropics were nearly devoid of life, with exceptionally arid conditions recorded in Iberia and other parts of Europe then at low latitude. Many big, active animals returned to the tropics, and plants recolonised on land, only when temperatures returned to normal.

There is evidence that life had recovered rapidly, at least locally. This is indicated by sites that show exceptionally high biodiversity (e.g. the earliest Spathian Paris Biota), which suggest that food webs were complex and comprised several trophic levels.

== Notable formations ==
- Middle Buntsandstein (Germany)
- Jialingjiang Formation (South China)
- Nanlinghu Formation (Anhui, China)
- Sulphur Mountain Formation (British Columbia, Canada)
- Thaynes Group/Limestone (western USA)
- Virgin Formation (Utah, USA)
- Vikinghøgda Formation (Lusitaniadalen and Vendomdalen members) (Svalbard, Norway)
