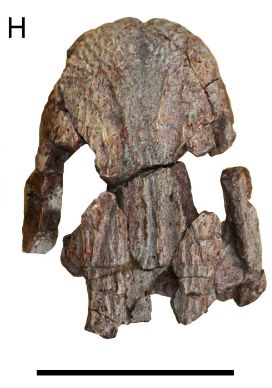
- Holotype skull of T. smisseni

Scientific classification
- Kingdom: Animalia
- Phylum: Chordata
- Clade: Tetrapoda
- Order: †Temnospondyli
- Suborder: †Stereospondyli
- Family: †Trematosauridae
- Subfamily: †Trematosaurinae
- Genus: †Tirraturhinus; Nield, Damiani and Warren, 2006

Type species
- †Tirraturhinus smisseni Nield, Damiani and Warren, 2006

= Tirraturhinus =

Tirraturhinus Temporal range: Lowermost Late Triassic (Carnian) ~236 Ma

Extinct genus of amphibians

Tirraturhinus is an extinct genus of trematosaurian temnospondyl within the family Trematosauridae. Its fossils were found in the lowermost Carnian age (Late Triassic) Duckworth Creek locality of the Arcadia Formation in Queensland, Australia. The type and only species is T. smisseni.

== See also ==
- Prehistoric amphibian
- List of prehistoric amphibians
