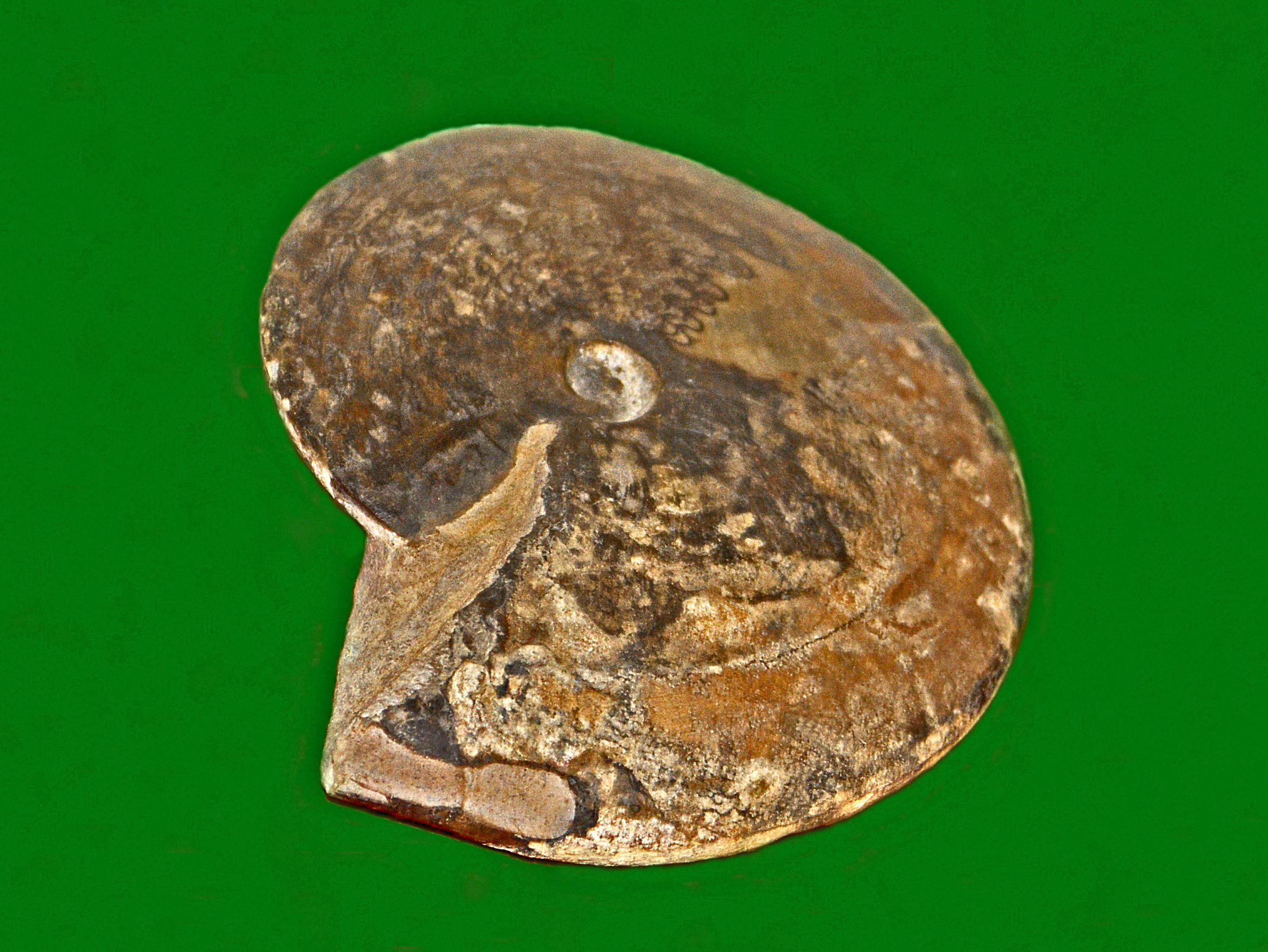
- Fossil shell of Hedenstroemia tscherskii from Madagascar, on display at Galerie de paléontologie et d'anatomie comparée in Paris

Scientific classification
- Kingdom: Animalia
- Phylum: Mollusca
- Class: Cephalopoda
- Subclass: †Ammonoidea
- Order: †Ceratitida
- Family: †Hedenstroemiidae
- Genus: †Hedenstroemia; Waagen, 1895

Species
- See text

= Hedenstroemia =

Hedenstroemia Temporal range: Early Triassic (Olenekian), 251.3–247.2 Ma

Extinct genus of cephalopods

Hedenstroemia is an extinct genus of Early Triassic (Olenekian) cephalopods in the ammonoid order Ceratitida. They were nektonic carnivores.

== Species ==
- †Hedenstroemia evoluta Spath, 1934
- †Hedenstroemia hedenstroemi Keyserling, 1845
- †Hedenstroemia kossmati Hyatt and Smith 1905
- †Hedenstroemia mojsisovicsi Diener 1897
- †Hedenstroemia tscherskii Popov 1939
- †Hedenstroemia waageni Welter 1922

== Distribution ==
Fossils of species within this family have been found in the Early Triassic of Afghanistan, Canada, Oman, Pakistan, Russia and United States.
