= Chiosella =

Scientific classification
- Kingdom: Animalia
- Phylum: Chordata
- Class: †Conodonta
- Genus: †Chiosella Kozur 1990

Species
- †Chiosella gondolelloides; †Chiosella timorensis

Extinct genus of jawless fishes

Chiosella is an extinct conodont genus.

The base of the Anisian stage (also the base of the Middle Triassic series and the top of the Olenekian) is sometimes laid at the first appearance of Chiosella timorensis in the stratigraphic record.
