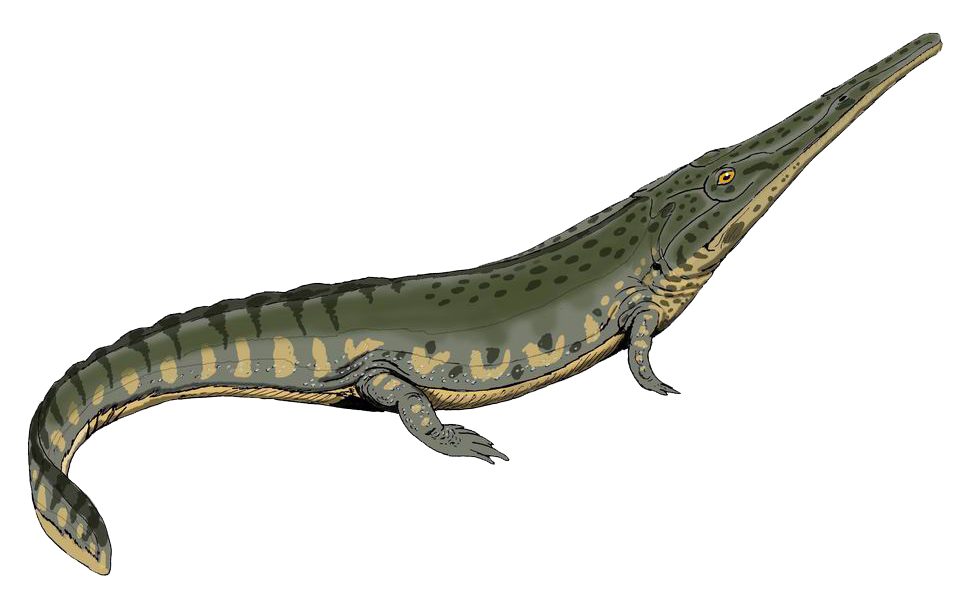
- Life restoration of Aphaneramma rostratum

Scientific classification
- Kingdom: Animalia
- Phylum: Chordata
- Clade: Tetrapoda
- Order: †Temnospondyli
- Suborder: †Stereospondyli
- Family: †Trematosauridae
- Subfamily: †Lonchorhynchinae; Säve-Söderbergh, 1935

Genera
- †Aphaneramma; †Cosgriffius; †Erythrobatrachus; †Stoschiosaurus; †Wantzosaurus; †Morovius

= Lonchorhynchinae =

Lonchorhynchinae Temporal range: Triassic

Extinct subfamily of amphibians

Lonchorhynchinae is a subfamily of temnospondyl amphibians within the family Trematosauridae.

== Classification ==
Below is a cladogram from Steyer (2002) showing the phylogenetic relationships of trematosaurids:

- Trematosauridae
  - Trematosaurinae
    - - Tertrema
      - - Lyrocephaliscus
        - Platystega
    - - Luzocephalus
      - - Trematosaurus
        - Trematosuchus
  - Lonchorhynchinae
    - Aphaneramma
    - - Erythrobatrachus
      - Cosgriffius
      - - Stoschiosaurus
        - Wantzosaurus
