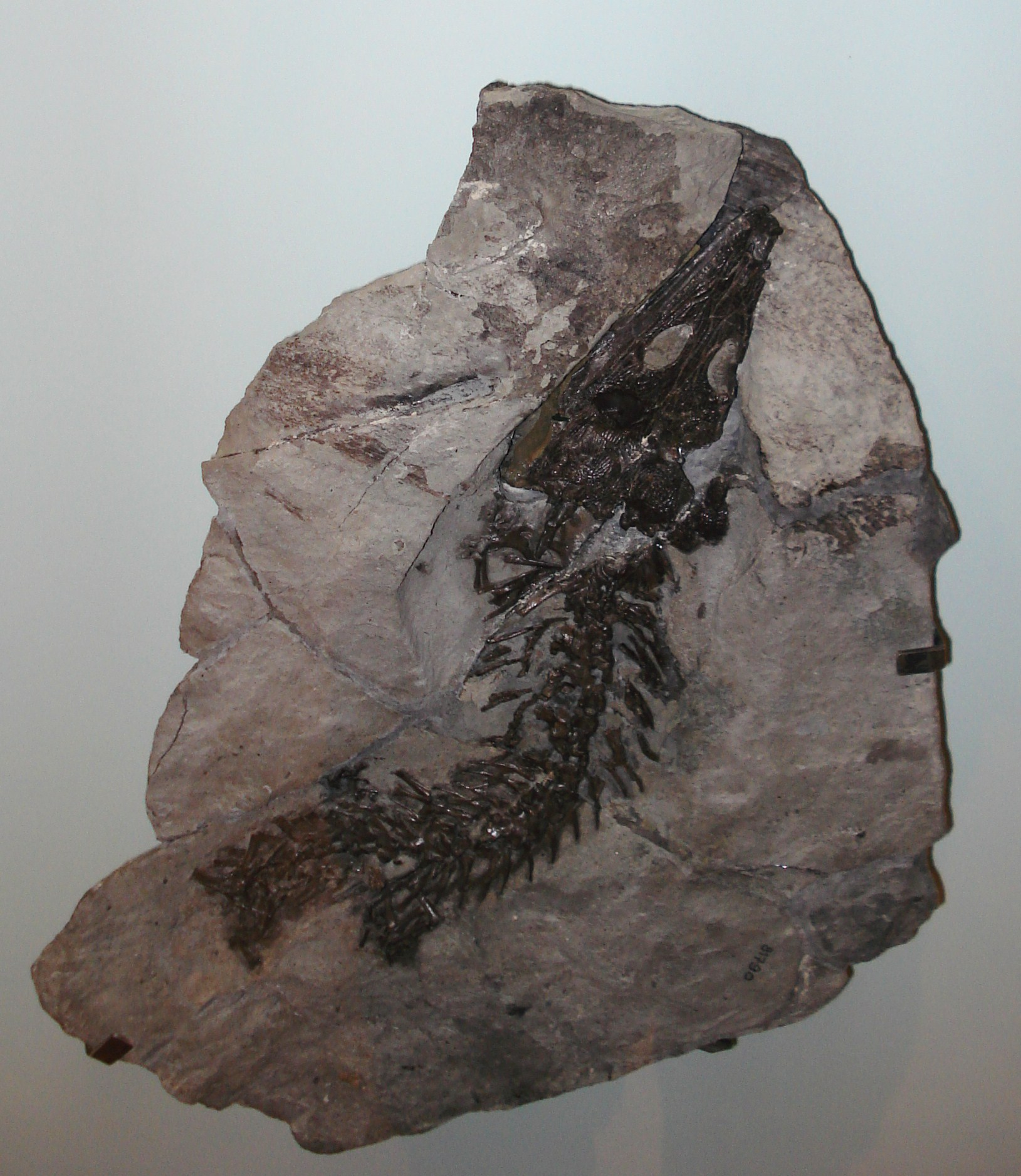
- Fossil of Trematolestes hagdorni in the State Museum of Natural History Stuttgart

Scientific classification
- Kingdom: Animalia
- Phylum: Chordata
- Clade: Tetrapoda
- Order: †Temnospondyli
- Suborder: †Stereospondyli
- Superfamily: †Trematosauroidea
- Family: †Trematosauridae; Watson, 1919

= Trematosauridae =

Trematosaurids Temporal range: Triassic (Possible Jurassic record), 251.9–220 Ma

Extinct family of temnospondyls

Trematosauridae is a family of large marine temnospondyls with several included genera.

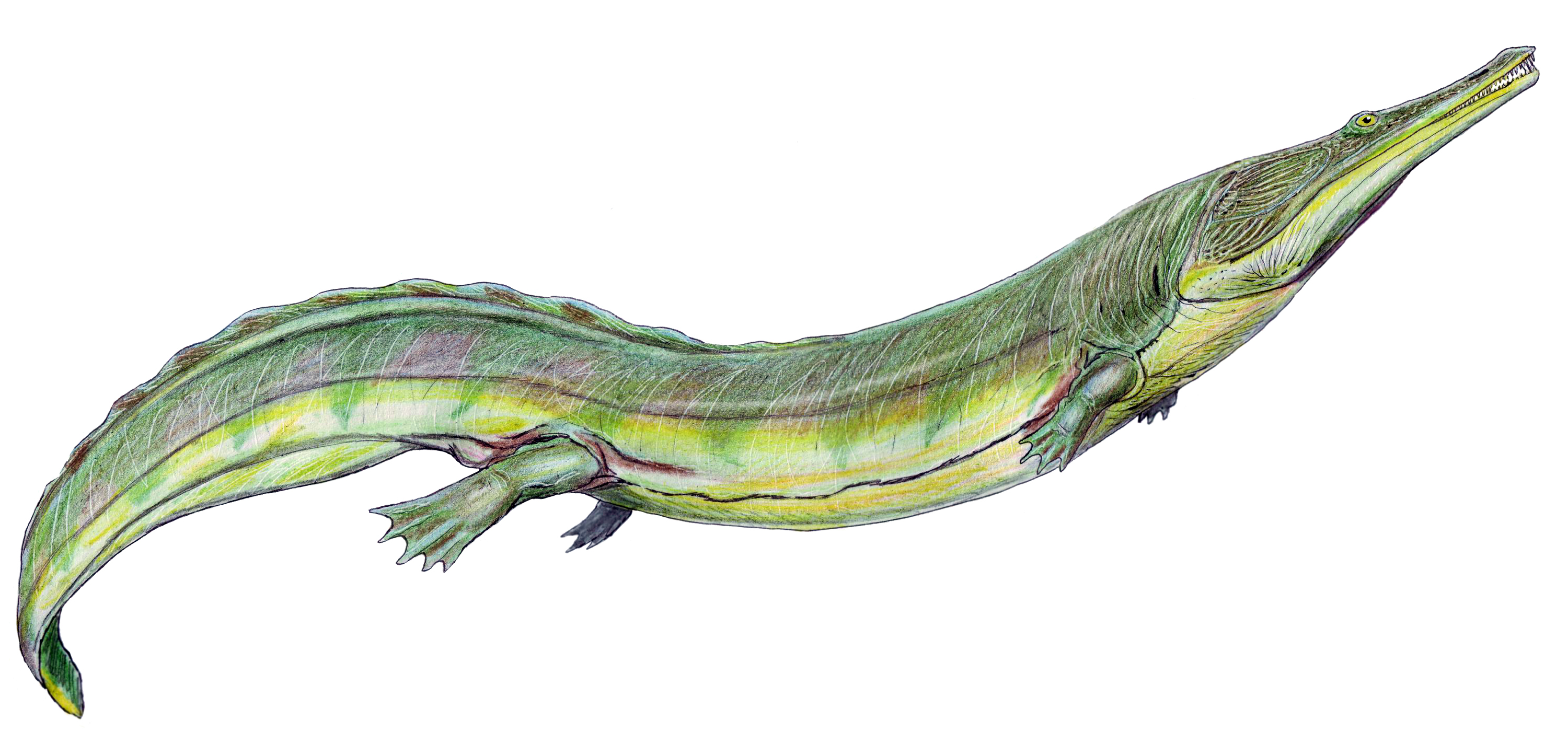
Life restoration of Trematosaurus

== Appearance and lifestyle ==
Trematosaurids are one of the most derived families of the Trematosauroidea superfamily in that they are the only family that have fully marine lifestyles. Long, slender snouts that are characteristic of the trematosaurids, with some members having rostra resembling those of modern-day gavials.

Traditionally, two subfamilies within Trematosauridae can be identified, the relatively short-nosed Trematosaurinae and the long-nosed Lonchorhynchinae. A third subfamily, Tertreminae, was named in 2000 and includes broad-snouted forms like Tirraturhinus.

== Fossil record ==
Trematosaurids first appeared during the Induan age (Wordie Creek Formation, Greenland) of the Early Triassic epoch. The family existed until around the Carnian age of the Late Triassic epoch, although by then they were very rare. By the Middle Triassic they had become widespread throughout Laurasia and Gondwana with fossils being found in Europe, Asia, Madagascar, and Australia. A possible trematosaurid has been found in the Toutunhe Formation in the Junggar Basin. If this analysis is accurate, it renders Trematosauridae one of the longest lived lineages of the Temnospondyli, having lasted as recently as the late Jurassic.

In 2006, a new Middle Triassic genus Trematolestes from southern Germany has been reported. It was the sister taxon of the subfamily Lonchorhynchinae and its closest relative was Tertremoides.

== Phylogeny ==
Below is a cladogram from Steyer (2002) showing the phylogenetic relationships of trematosaurids:

- Trematosauridae
  - Trematosaurinae
    - - Tertrema
      - - Lyrocephaliscus
        - Platystega
    - - Luzocephalus
      - - Trematosaurus
        - Trematosuchus
  - Lonchorhynchinae
    - Aphaneramma
    - - Erythrobatrachus
      - Cosgriffius
      - - Stoschiosaurus
        - Wantzosaurus

A cladogram after Novikov (2018) with only Early Triassic Eastern Europe taxa included:

- Trematosauridae
  - Prothoosuchus
  - - Thoosuchus
    - - Trematotegmen
      - - Angusaurus
        - - Inflectosaurus
          - Trematosaurus
