= Stoschiosaurus =

Scientific classification
- Kingdom: Animalia
- Phylum: Chordata
- Clade: Tetrapoda
- Order: †Temnospondyli
- Suborder: †Stereospondyli
- Family: †Trematosauridae
- Subfamily: †Lonchorhynchinae
- Genus: †Stoschiosaurus; Säve-Söderbergh, 1935

Species
- S. nielseni Säve-Söderbergh, 1935

Extinct genus of amphibians

Stoschiosaurus is an extinct genus of trematosaurian temnospondyl within the family Trematosauridae. It lived during the Early Triassic in what is now Greenland. Fossils were found in the Wordie Creek Formation.

== See also ==
- Prehistoric amphibian
- List of prehistoric amphibians
