= Early Triassic =

First of three epochs of the Triassic Period

Early/Lower Triassic
- 251.902 – 246.7 Ma
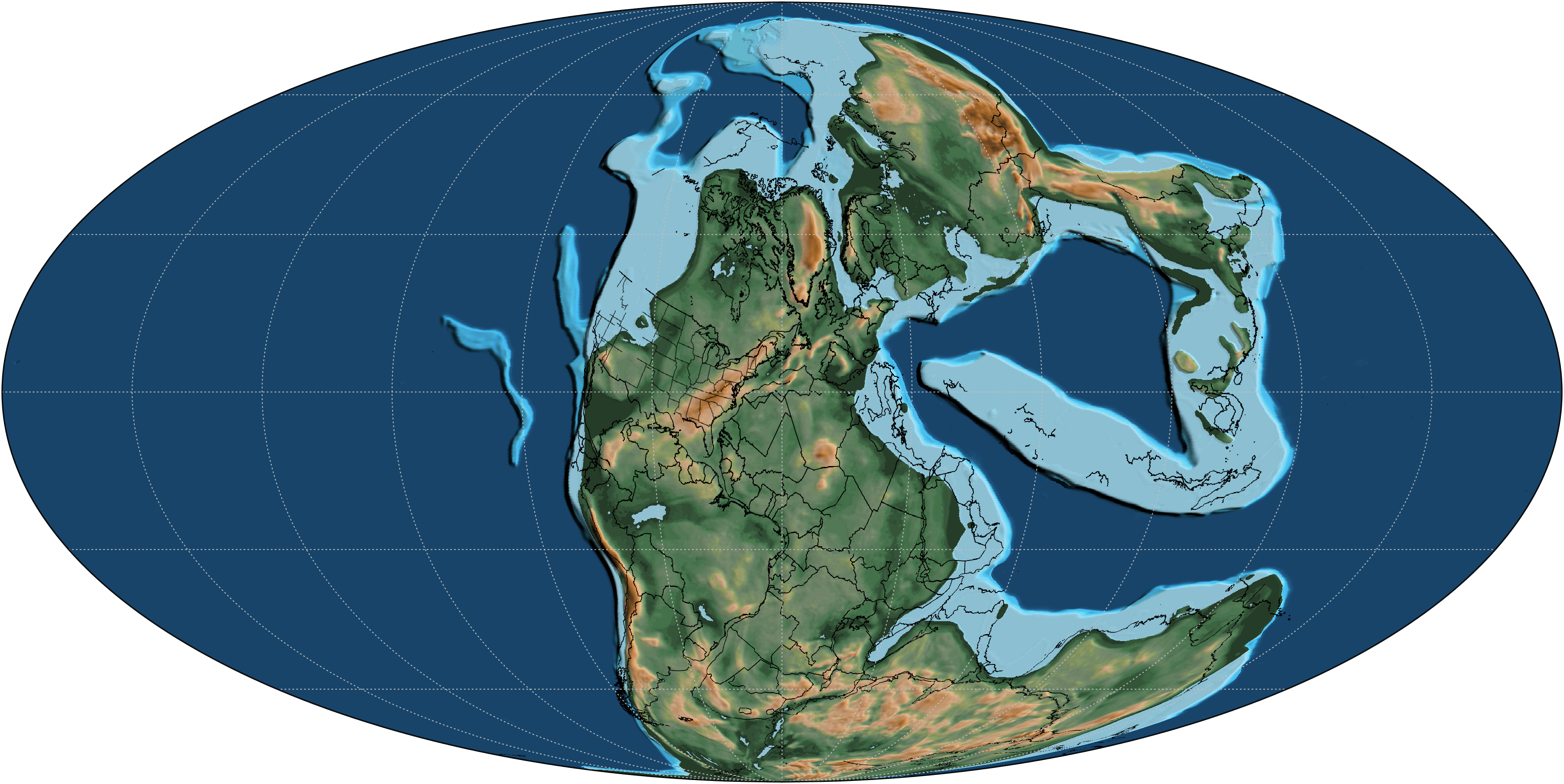
- A map of Earth as it appeared 250 million years ago during the Early Triassic Epoch, Olenekian Age

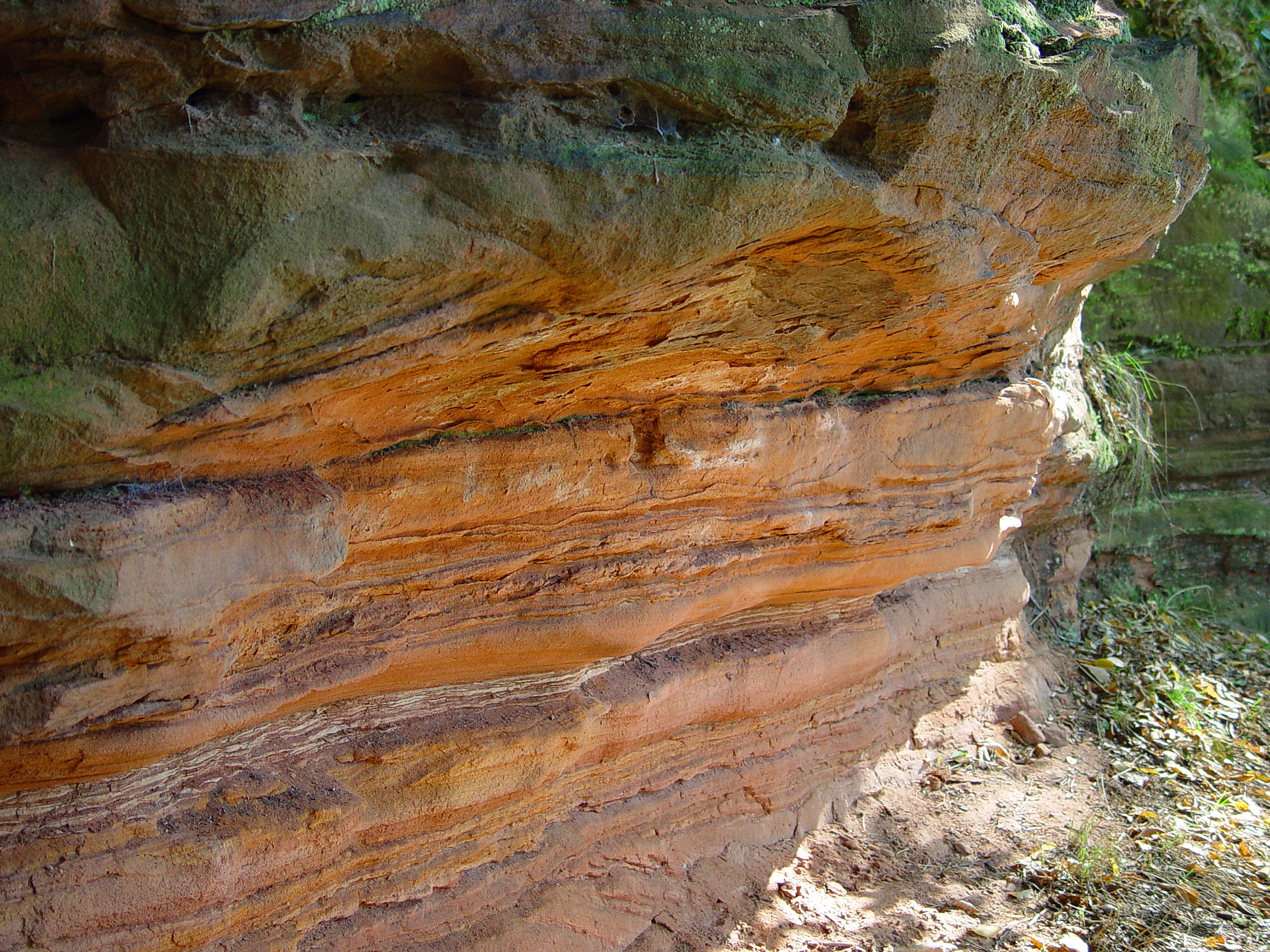
- Sandstone from the Lower Triassic Series

Chronology
← / Triassic–Jurassic extinction event; ← / Scleractinian corals & calcified sponges; ← / Carnian pluvial episode; ← / Manicouagan impact; ← / Coals return; ← / Full recovery of woody trees; ← / Smithian–Spathian boundary event; ← / Permian-Triassic extinction event
Subdivision of the Triassic according to the ICS, as of 2024. Vertical axis scale: Millions of years ago

Etymology
- Chronostratigraphic name: Lower Triassic
- Geochronological name: Early Triassic
- Name formality: Formal

Usage information
- Celestial body: Earth
- Regional usage: Global (ICS)
- Time scale(s) used: ICS Time Scale

Definition
- Chronological unit: Epoch
- Stratigraphic unit: Series
- Time span formality: Formal
- Lower boundary definition: FAD of the Conodont Hindeodus parvus
- Lower boundary GSSP: Meishan, Zhejiang, China; 31.0798°N 119.7058°E
- Lower GSSP ratified: 2001
- Upper boundary definition: Not formally defined
- Upper boundary definition candidates: FAD of the Conodont Chiosella timorensis; Base of magnetic zone MT1n
- Upper boundary GSSP candidate section(s): Desli Caira, Northern Dobruja, Romania; Guandao, Guizhou, China

The Early Triassic is the first of three epochs of the Triassic Period of the geologic timescale. It spans the time between 251.902 Ma and 247 Ma (million years ago). Rocks from this epoch are collectively known as the Lower Triassic Series, which is a unit in chronostratigraphy. The Early Triassic is the oldest epoch of the Mesozoic Era. It is preceded by the Lopingian Epoch (late Permian, Paleozoic Era) and followed by the Middle Triassic Epoch. The Early Triassic is divided into the Induan and Olenekian ages. The Induan is subdivided into the Griesbachian and Dienerian ages and the Olenekian is subdivided into the Smithian and Spathian ages.

The Lower Triassic series is coeval with the Scythian Stage, which is today not included in the official timescales but can be found in older literature. In Europe, most of the Lower Triassic is composed of Buntsandstein, a lithostratigraphic unit of continental red beds.

The Early Triassic and partly also the Middle Triassic span the interval of biotic recovery from the Permian-Triassic extinction event, the most severe mass extinction event in Earth's history. A second extinction event, the Smithian-Spathian boundary event, occurred during the Olenekian. A third extinction event occurred at the Olenekian-Anisian boundary, marking the end of the Early Triassic epoch.

== Early Triassic climate ==
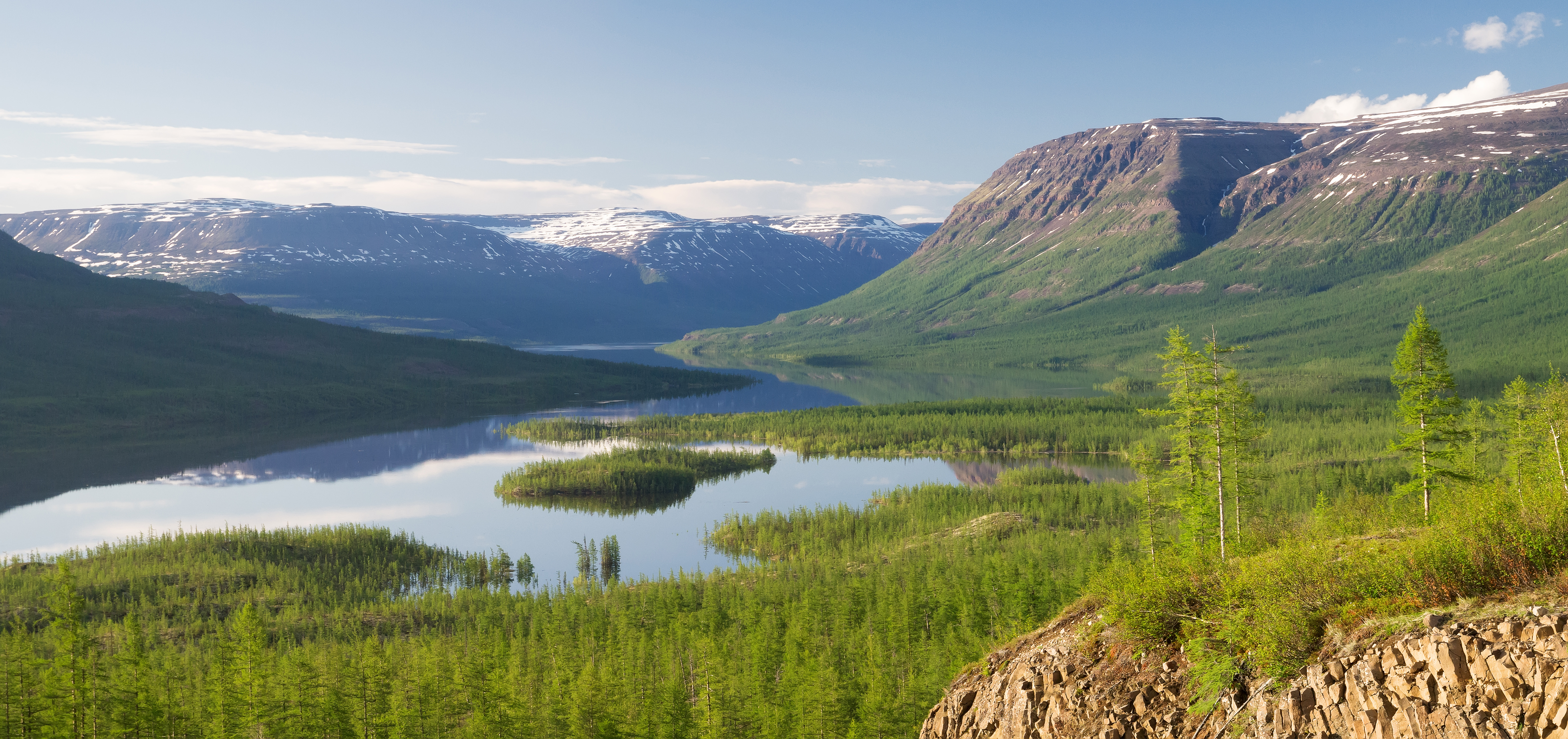
The Putorana Plateau is composed of basalt rocks of the Siberian Traps.

The climate during the Early Triassic Epoch (especially in the interior of the supercontinent Pangaea) was generally arid, rainless and dry, and deserts were widespread; however the poles possessed a temperate climate. The pole-to-equator temperature gradient was temporally flat during the Early Triassic and may have allowed tropical species to extend their distribution poleward. This is evidenced by the global distribution of ammonoids. The extremely hot ocean temperatures facilitated powerful hurricanes that frequently hit the coast of North China.

The mostly hot climate of the Early Triassic may have been caused by late volcanic eruptions of the Siberian Traps, which had probably triggered the Permian-Triassic extinction event and accelerated the rate of global warming into the Triassic. Studies suggest that Early Triassic climate was very volatile, punctuated by a number of relatively rapid global temperature changes, marine anoxic events, and carbon cycle disturbances, which led to subsequent extinction events in the aftermath of the Permian-Triassic extinction event. On the other hand, an alternative hypothesis proposes these Early Triassic climatic perturbations and biotic upheavals that inhibited the recovery of life following the P-Tr mass extinction to have been linked to forcing driven by changes in the Earth's obliquity defined by a roughly 32.8 thousand year periodicity with strong 1.2 million year modulations. According to proponents of this hypothesis, radiometric dating indicates that major activity from the Siberian Traps ended very shortly after the end-Permian extinction and did not span the entire Early Triassic epoch, thus not being the primary culprit for the climatic changes throughout this epoch.

== Early Triassic life ==
=== Fauna and flora ===
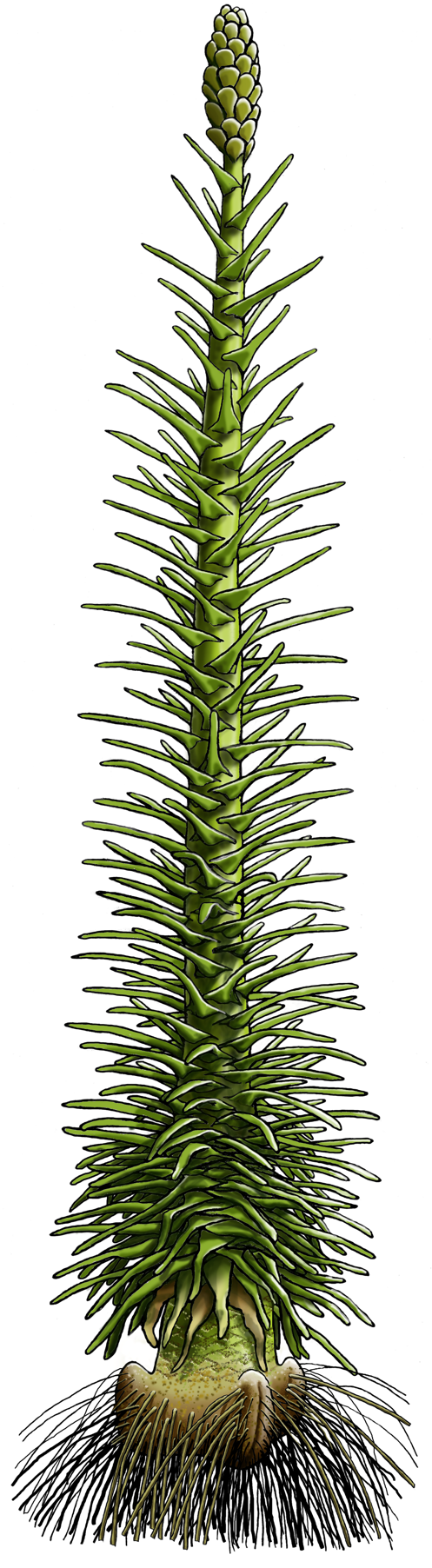
Pleuromeia represented a dominant element of global floras during the Early Triassic

The Triassic Period opened in the aftermath of the Permian–Triassic extinction event. The massive extinctions that ended the Permian Period (and with that the Paleozoic Era) caused extreme hardships for the surviving species.

The Early Triassic Epoch saw the biotic recovery of life after the biggest mass extinction event of the past, which took millions of years due to the severity of the event and the harsh Early Triassic climate. Many types of corals, brachiopods, molluscs, echinoderms, and other invertebrates had disappeared. The Permian vegetation, which was dominated by Glossopteris in the Southern Hemisphere, ceased to exist. Other groups, such as Actinopterygii, appear to have been less affected by this extinction event and body size was not a selective factor during the extinction event. Animals that were most successful in the Early Triassic were those with high metabolisms. Different patterns of recovery are evident on land and in the sea. Early Triassic faunas lacked biodiversity and were relatively homogeneous due to the effects of the extinction. The ecological recovery on land took 30 million years, well into the Late Triassic. Two Early Triassic lagerstätten stand out due to their exceptionally high biodiversity, the Dienerian aged Guiyang biota and the earliest Spathian aged Paris biota.

==== Terrestrial biota ====
The most common land vertebrate was the small herbivorous synapsid Lystrosaurus. Often interpreted as a disaster taxon (although this view was questioned), Lystrosaurus had a wide range across Pangea. In the southern part of the supercontinent, it co-occurred with the non-mammalian cynodonts Galesaurus and Thrinaxodon, early relatives of mammals. The first archosauriforms appeared, such as Erythrosuchus (Olenekian-Ladinian). This group includes the ancestors of crocodiles and dinosaurs (including birds). Fossilized foot prints of dinosauromorphs are known from the Olenekian. The Early Triassic entomofauna is very poorly understood because of the paucity of insect fossils from this epoch.

The flora was gymnosperm-dominated at the onset of the Triassic, but changed rapidly and became lycopod-dominated (e.g. Pleuromeia) during the Griesbachian-Dienerian ecological crisis. This change coincided with the extinction of the Permian Glossopteris flora. In the Spathian subage, the flora changed back to gymnosperm and pteridophyte dominated. These shifts reflect global changes in precipitation and temperature. Floral diversity was overall very low during the Early Triassic, as plant life had yet to fully recover from the Permian-Triassic extinction.

Microbially induced sedimentary structures (MISS) are common in the fossil record of North China in the immediate aftermath of the Permian-Triassic extinction, indicating that microbial mats dominated local terrestrial ecosystems following the Permian-Triassic boundary. The regional prevalence of MISS is attributable to a decrease in bioturbation and grazing pressure as a result of aridification and temperature increase. MISS have also been reported from Early Triassic fossil deposits in Arctic Canada. The disappearance of MISS later in the Early Triassic has been interpreted as a signal of increased bioturbation and recovery of terrestrial ecosystems.

==== Aquatic biota ====
In the oceans, the most common Early Triassic hard-shelled marine invertebrates were bivalves, gastropods, ammonoids, echinoids, and a few articulate brachiopods. Conodonts experienced a revival in diversity following a nadir during the Permian. The first oysters (Liostrea) appeared in the Early Triassic. They grew on the shells of living ammonoids as epizoans. Microbial reefs were common, possibly due to lack of competition with metazoan reef builders as a result of the extinction. However, transient metazoan reefs reoccurred during the Olenekian wherever permitted by environmental conditions. Ammonoids show blooms followed by extinctions during the Early Triassic.

Aquatic vertebrates diversified after the extinction:

- Fishes: Many species of fish had a worldwide distribution during the Early Triassic. Typical Triassic ray-finned fishes, such as Australosomus, Birgeria, Bobasatrania, Boreosomus, Pteronisculus, Parasemionotidae and Saurichthys appeared close to the Permian-Triassic boundary, whereas neopterygians (including stem teleosts) diversified later during the Triassic, though the pattern of the Triassic diversification of bony fishes is not well understood due to a taphonomic megabias (Spathian-Bithynian Gap, SBG) in the late Early Triassic and early Middle Triassic. The earliest large durophagous neopterygian is known from this gap, suggesting an early onset in feeding specializations of this group. Most bony fish reached large body sizes during the Early Triassic. Coelacanths show a peak in their diversity during this epoch, including new modes of life, such as the fork-tailed Rebellatrix. Chondrichthyes are represented by Hybodontiformes like Palaeobates, Omanoselache, Lissodus, some Neoselachii, as well as a few last survivors of the Eugeneodontida (Caseodus, Fadenia).
- Amphibians: Relatively large, marine temnospondyl amphibians, such as Aphaneramma or Wantzosaurus, were geographically widespread during the Induan and Olenekian ages. The fossils of these crocodile-shaped amphibians were found in Greenland, Spitsbergen, Pakistan and Madagascar.
- Reptiles: In the oceans, the first marine reptiles appeared during the Early Triassic. Their descendants ruled the oceans during the Mesozoic. Hupehsuchia, Ichthyopterygia and Sauropterygia are among the first marine reptiles to enter the scene in the Olenekian (e.g. Cartorhynchus, Chaohusaurus, Utatsusaurus, Hupehsuchus, Grippia, Omphalosaurus, Corosaurus). Other marine reptiles such as Tanystropheus, Helveticosaurus, Atopodentatus, placodonts or the thalattosaurs followed later in the Middle Triassic. The Anisian aged ichthyosaur Thalattoarchon was one of the first marine macropredators capable of eating prey that was similar in size to itself, an ecological role that can be compared to that of modern orcas.

=== Fossil gallery ===
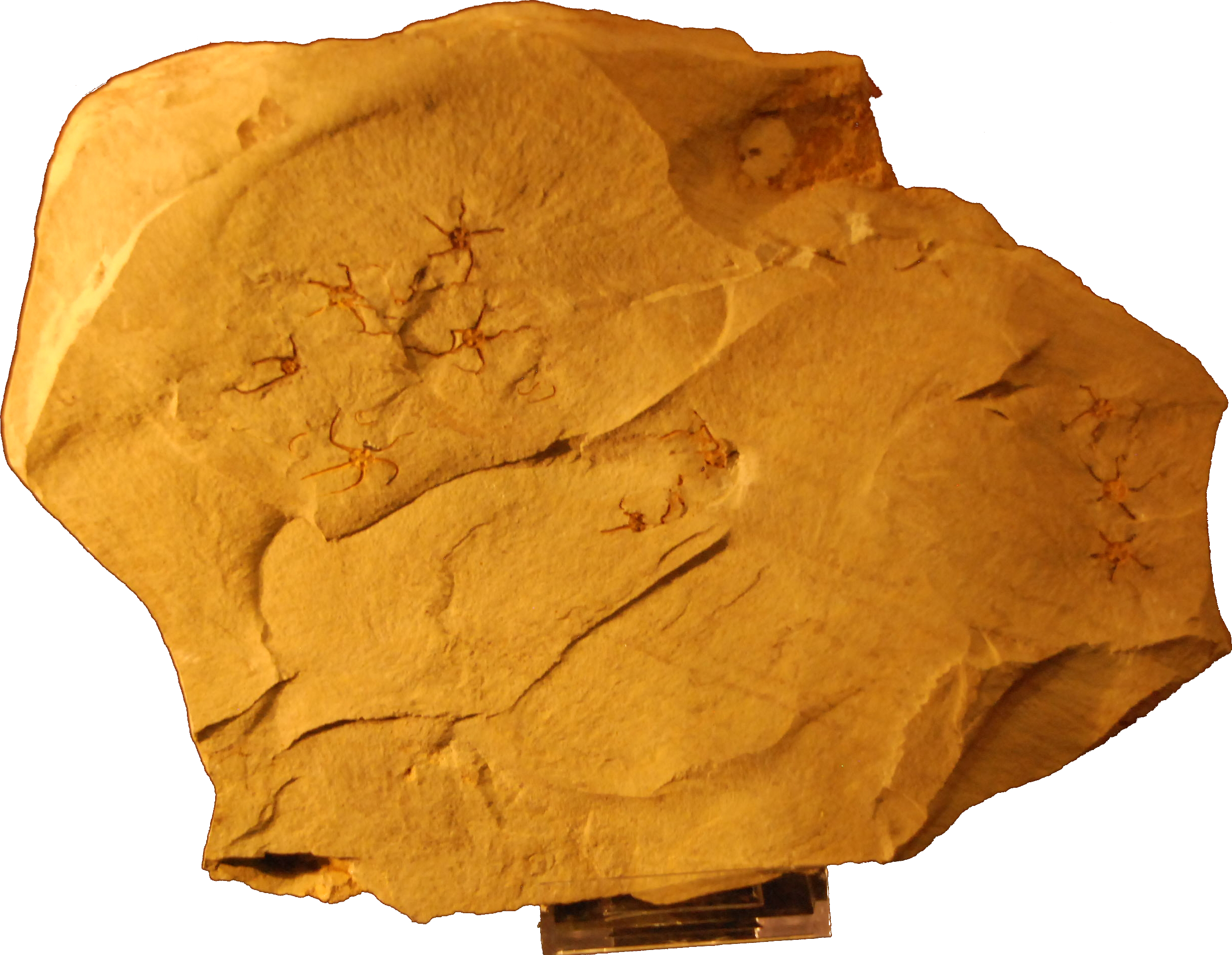
Early Triassic brittle stars (echinoderms)

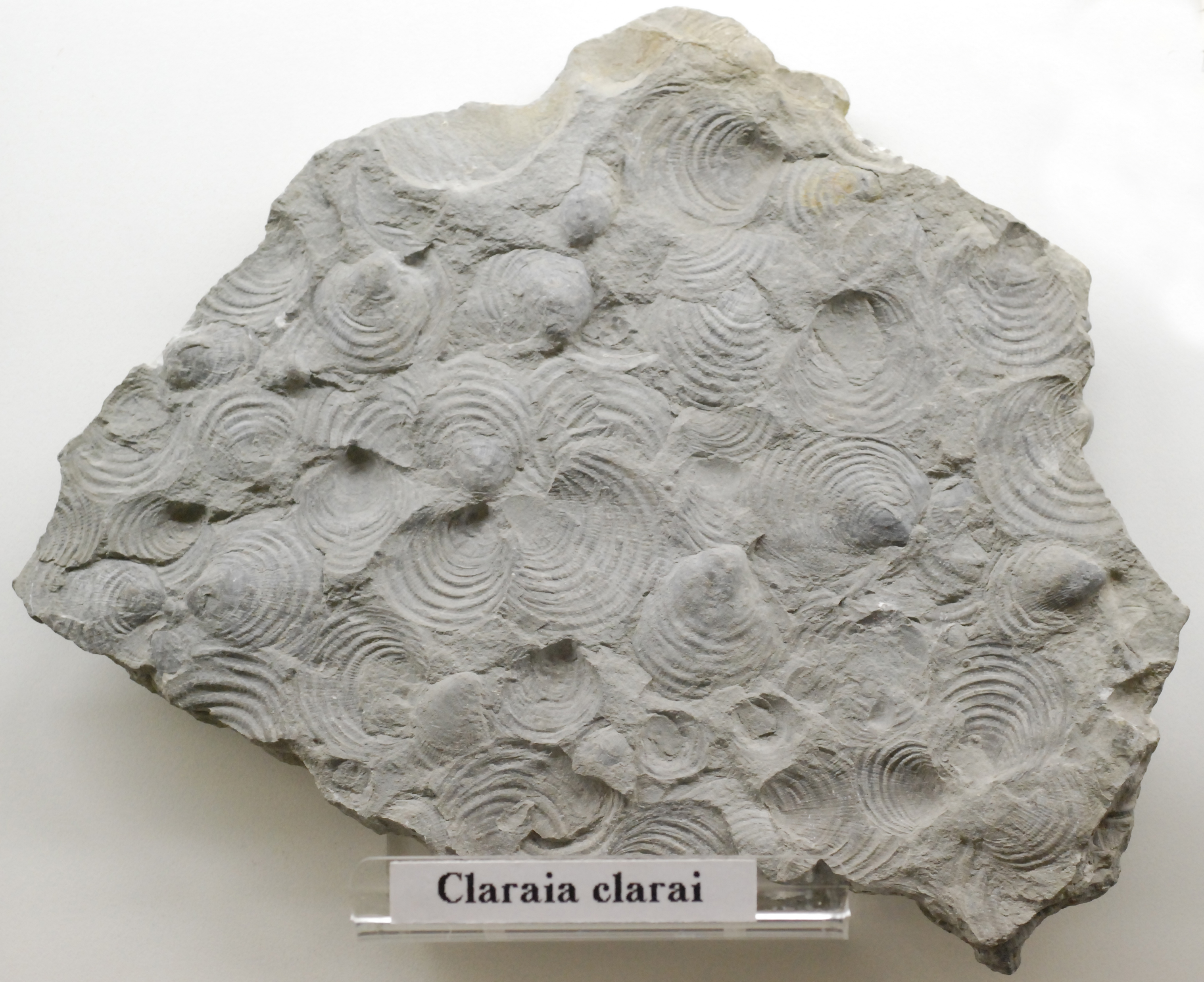
Fossils of the bivalve Claraia clarai

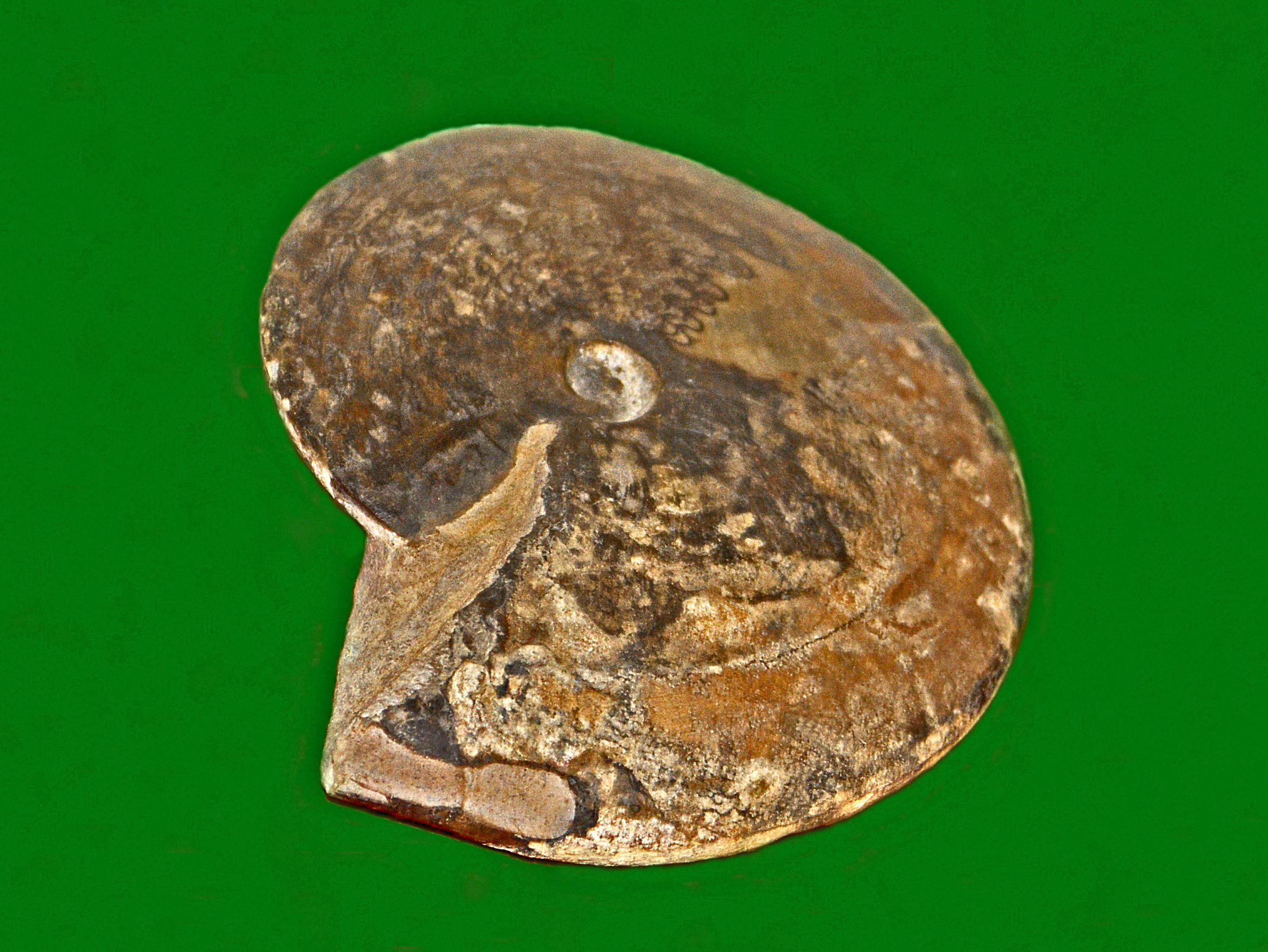
Early Triassic ammonoid Hedenstroemia

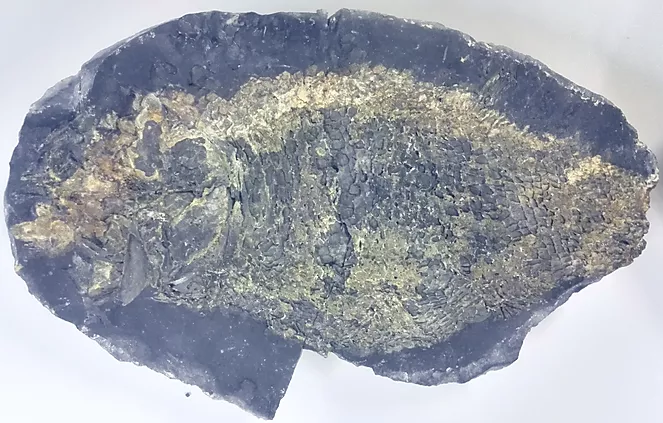
Fossil of the Early Triassic neopterygian Candelarialepis argentus

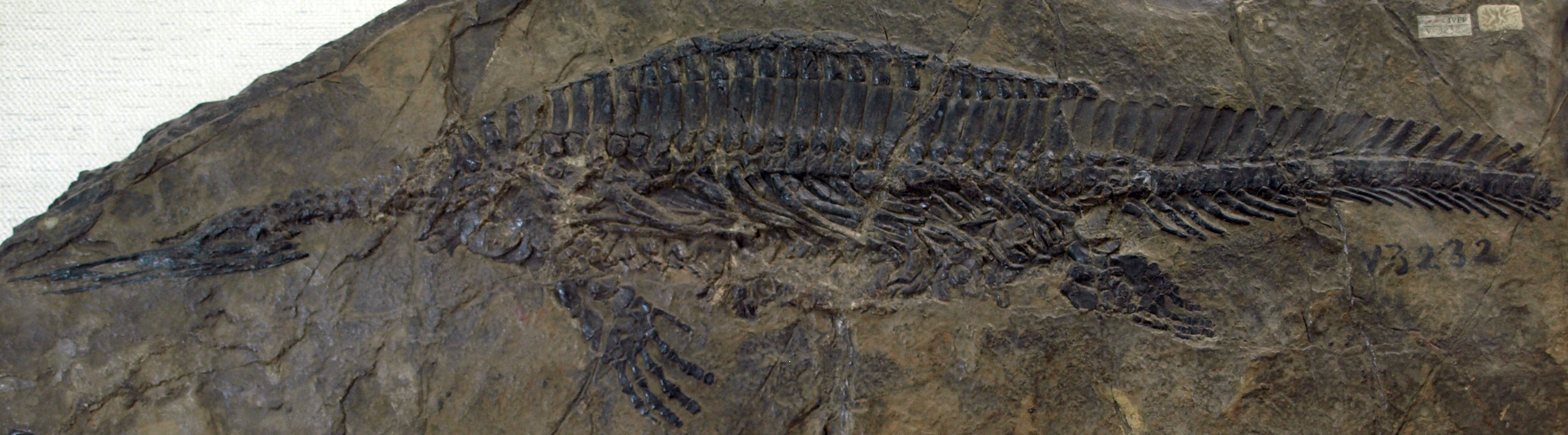
Early Triassic Hupehsuchus fossil in the Paleozoological Museum of China

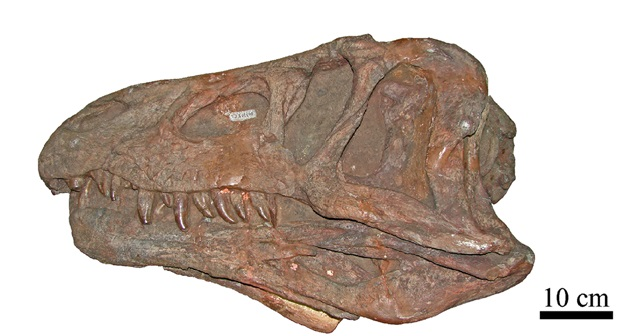
Skull of the Early Triassic archosauriform Erythrosuchus

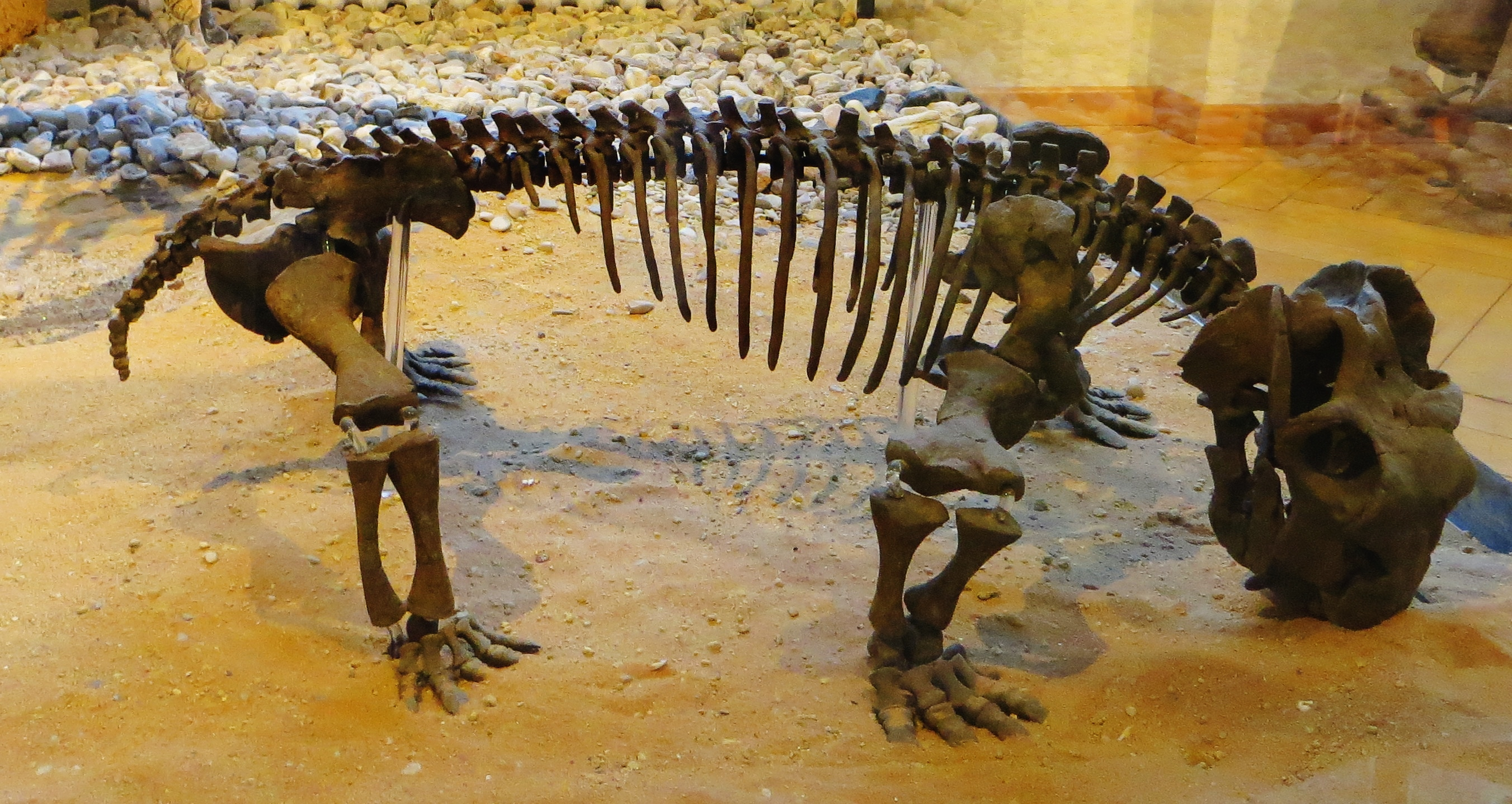
Lystrosaurus hedini skeleton at the Museum of Paleontology in Tübingen

== See also ==
- Geologic time scale
- Triassic
- Mass extinction
