= Erythrobatrachus =

Scientific classification
- Kingdom: Animalia
- Phylum: Chordata
- Clade: Tetrapoda
- Order: †Temnospondyli
- Suborder: †Stereospondyli
- Family: †Trematosauridae
- Genus: †Erythrobatrachus
- Species: †E. noonkanbahensis

Binomial name
- †Erythrobatrachus noonkanbahensis Cosgriff and Garbutt, 1972

Extinct genus of amphibians

Erythrobatrachus is an extinct genus of trematosaurian temnospondyl within the family Trematosauridae. The sole species Erythrobatrachus noonkanbahensis was separated to a monotypic genus, distinguishing it from related taxa when the description was published in 1972. The type material was a matrix cast revealing the impression of several fragments of skull excavated at the Blina Shale formation in the northwest of the Australian continent. The genus name is derived from ancient Greek, combining terms for red, erythro, with frog, batrachos, to describe the iron staining of the fossilised amphibian specimens. The type location described by the specific epithet was Noonkanbah Station.

A 2026 study showed that one of the specimens originally assigned to Erythrobatrachus actually belonged to another temnospondyl, Aphaneramma. This specimen was presumed lost until it was recovered in a museum collection in Berkeley, USA.

== See also ==
- Prehistoric amphibian
- List of prehistoric amphibians
