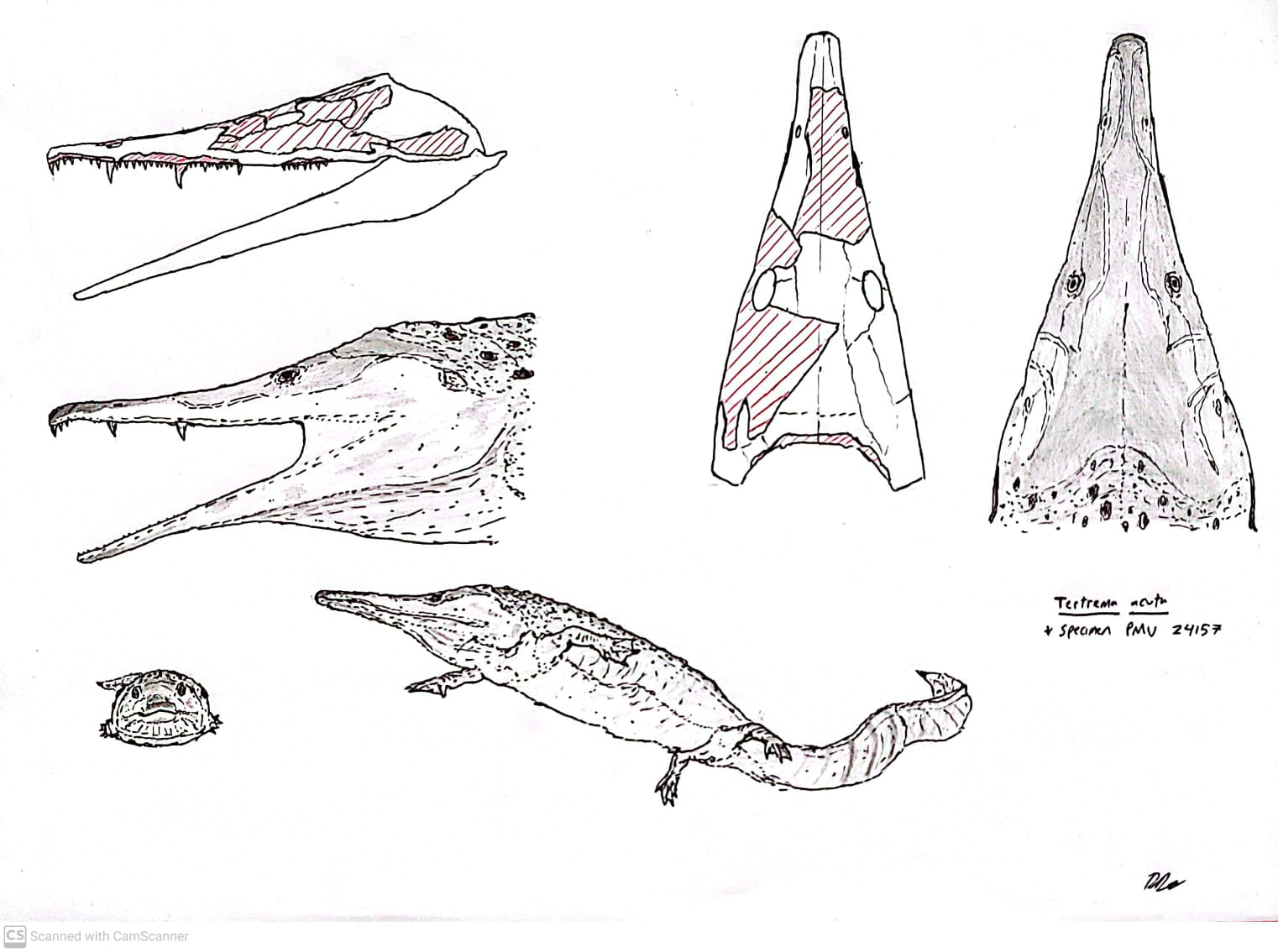

Scientific classification
- Kingdom: Animalia
- Phylum: Chordata
- Clade: Tetrapoda
- Order: †Temnospondyli
- Suborder: †Stereospondyli
- Family: †Trematosauridae
- Subfamily: †Trematosaurinae
- Genus: †Tertrema; Wiman, 1915

Type species
- †T. acuta Wiman, 1915

= Tertrema =

Extinct genus of amphibians

Tertrema is an extinct genus of trematosaurian temnospondyl within the family Trematosauridae. It is known from skull material from the Vikinghøgda Formation on Spitsbergen Island in Svalbard. Relative to most trematosaurids, Tertrema has a proportionally short snout and widely spaced occipital condyles. While typically placed in the subfamily Trematosaurinae, a 2021 phylogenetic analysis suggested that it was actually nested among the long-snouted lonchorhynchine trematosaurids.

== See also ==
- Prehistoric amphibian
- List of prehistoric amphibians
