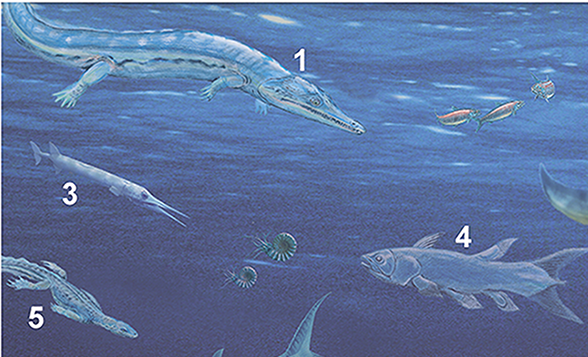
- Wantzosaurus (1) and other Triassic marine predators

Scientific classification
- Kingdom: Animalia
- Phylum: Chordata
- Clade: Tetrapoda
- Order: †Temnospondyli
- Suborder: †Stereospondyli
- Family: †Trematosauridae
- Subfamily: †Lonchorhynchinae
- Genus: †Wantzosaurus; Lehman, 1961
- Species: †W. elongatus

Binomial name
- †Wantzosaurus elongatus Lehman, 1961

= Wantzosaurus =

Wantzosaurus Temporal range: Induan, Early Triassic, 251–250 Ma

Genus of amphibians

Wantzosaurus is an extinct genus of temnospondyl amphibian of the Trematosauridae family. Fossils have been found in the Early Triassic Middle Sakamena Formation (Sakamena Group) of what is now Madagascar. It showed adaptations for an almost completely aquatic lifestyle, having the ability to swim by lateral undulation. A pelagic lifestyle for this animal has been proposed.
