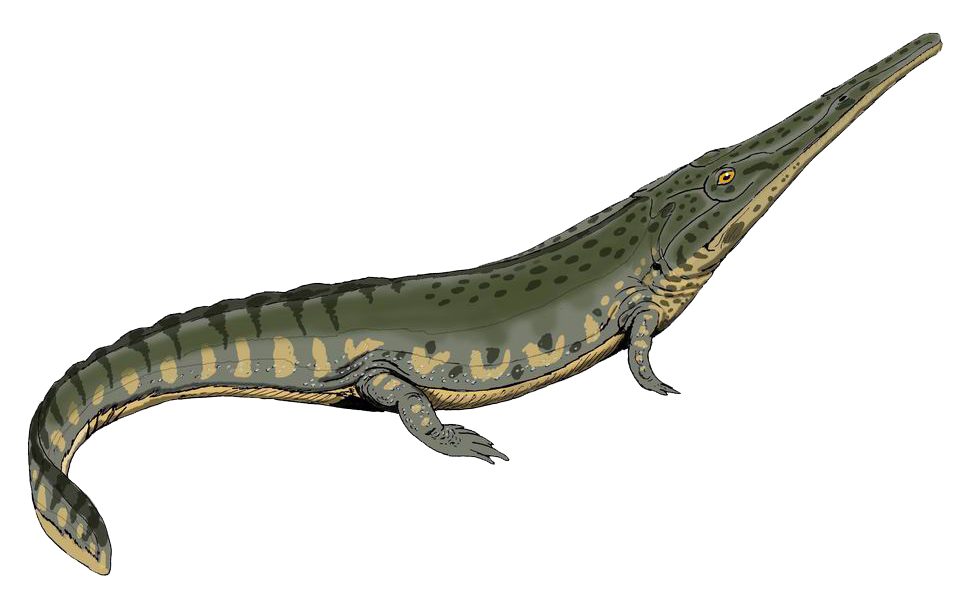

Scientific classification
- Kingdom: Animalia
- Phylum: Chordata
- Clade: Tetrapoda
- Order: †Temnospondyli
- Suborder: †Stereospondyli
- Family: †Trematosauridae
- Subfamily: †Lonchorhynchinae
- Genus: †Aphaneramma; Woodward, 1904

Type species
- †Aphaneramma rostratum Woodward, 1904

Other species
- †A. gavialimimus Fortuny et al., 2017; †A. kokeni (von Huene, 1920)

Synonyms
- Halobatrachus Hammer, 1987

= Aphaneramma =

Aphaneramma Temporal range: Early Triassic

Extinct genus of amphibians

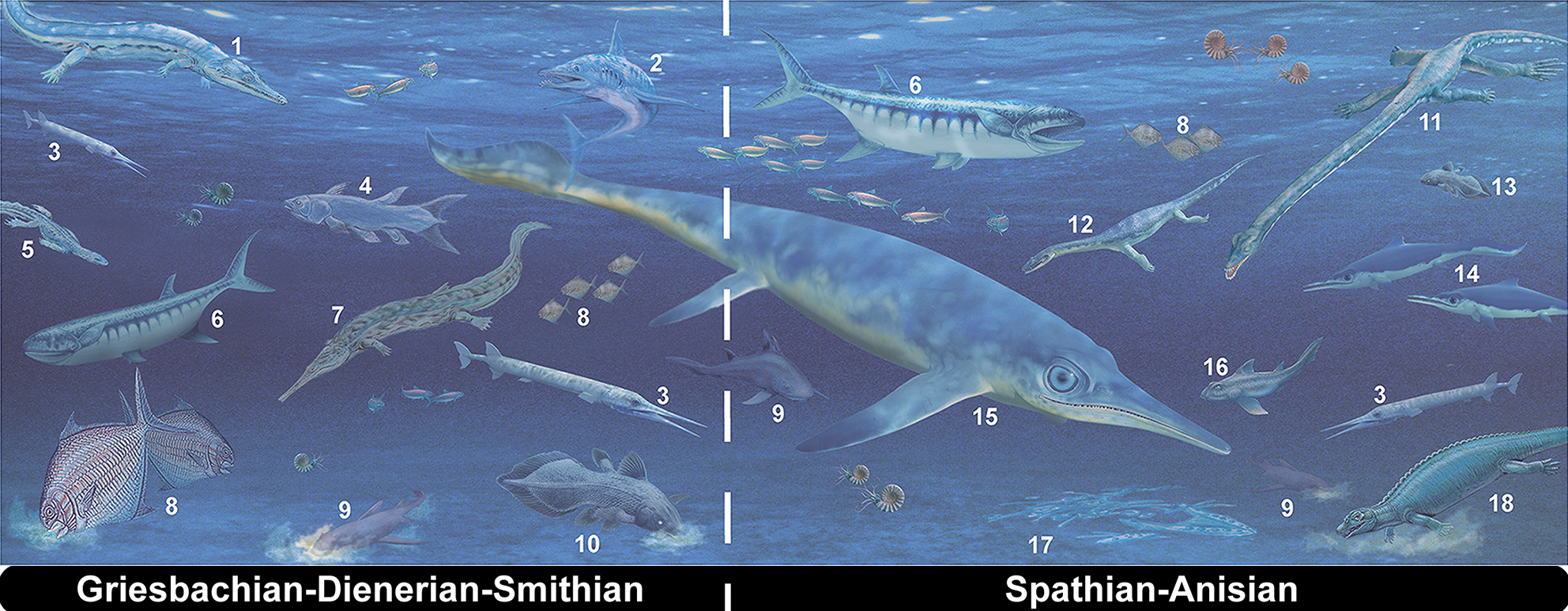
Early Triassic and Anisian marine predators: 7. Aphaneramma

Aphaneramma is an extinct genus of marine temnospondyl amphibian. It lived during the Early Triassic epoch, approximately 252–247 Ma ago, and had a global distribution.

Fossils have been found in the Mianwali Formation of Pakistan, Madagascar, the Zhitkov Formation of Russia, the Vikinghøgda Formation (Kongressfjellet Formation) of Svalbard (Norway), and the Blina Shale of Western Australia.

Aphaneramma had a skull about 40 centimetres (16 in) in length. Its jaws were very long, similar to the extant gharial's, and lined with small teeth. This adaptation suggests that it may have preyed on fish. A marine lifestyle for this animal was proposed.

Aphaneramma is closely related to Cosgriffius from North America.
