= Cosgriffius =

Scientific classification
- Kingdom: Animalia
- Phylum: Chordata
- Clade: Tetrapoda
- Order: †Temnospondyli
- Suborder: †Stereospondyli
- Family: †Trematosauridae
- Subfamily: †Lonchorhynchinae
- Genus: †Cosgriffius; Welles, 1993

Species
- C. campi Welles, 1993 (type)

Extinct genus of amphibians

Cosgriffius is an extinct genus of trematosaurian temnospondyl within the family Trematosauridae. It was described in 1993 by Samuel P. Welles based on a single partial skull from the well-known Meteor Crater Quarry (Early Triassic Moenkopi Formation) in Arizona that also produced more abundant remains of the capitosaur Wellesaurus peabodyi. The skull was long and slender, features typically associated with the trematosaurid subfamily Lonchorhynchinae. This is the only trematosaurid known from western North America.

== See also ==
- Prehistoric amphibian
- List of prehistoric amphibians
