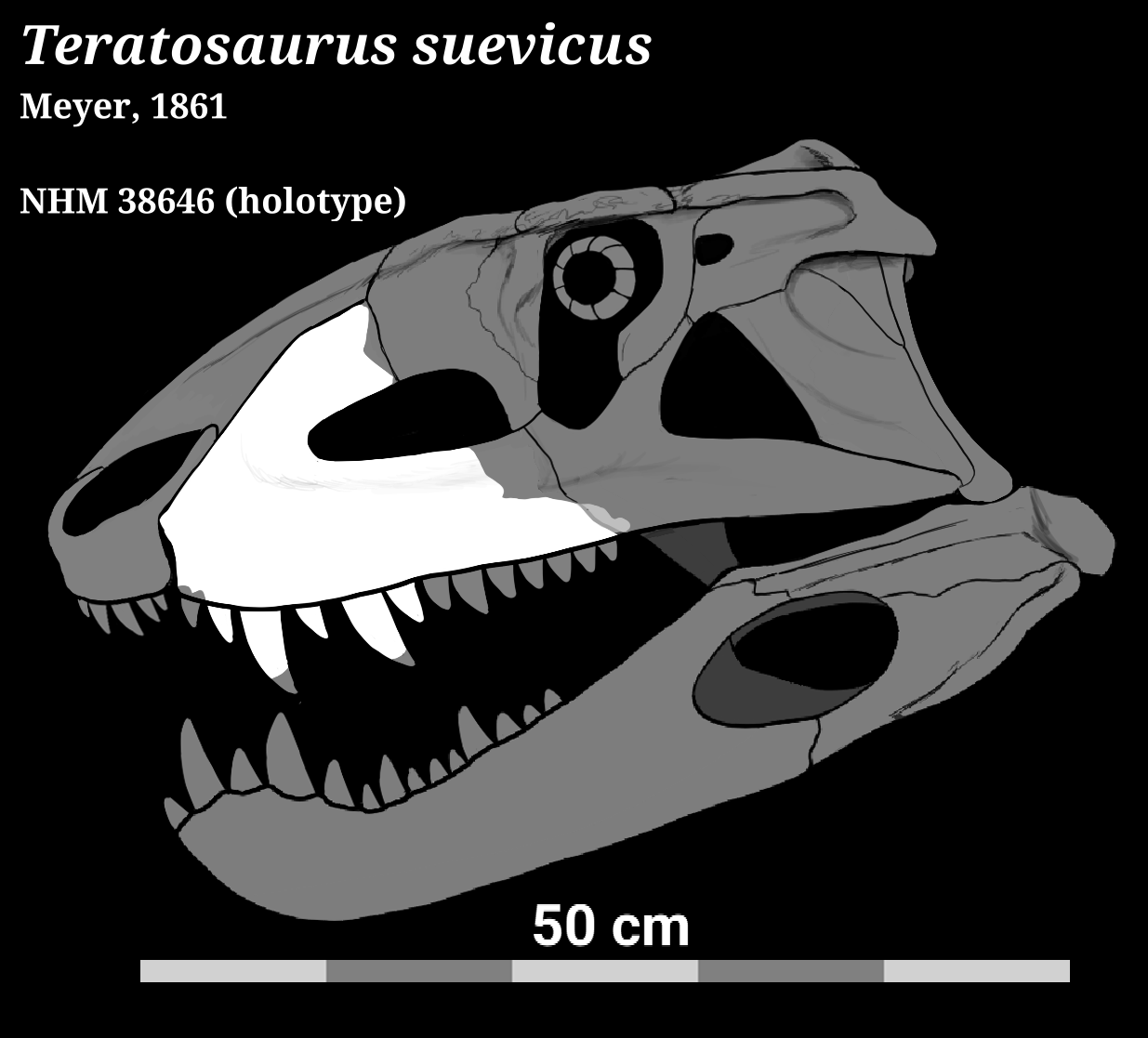
- Skull diagram
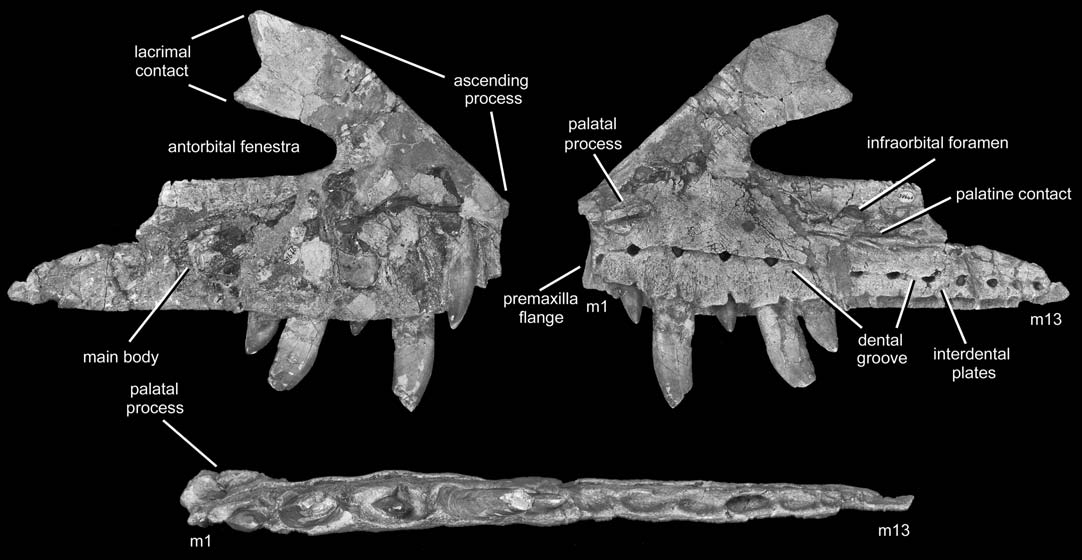
- Right maxilla of the holotype (NHMUK PV OR 38646)

Scientific classification
- Kingdom: Animalia
- Phylum: Chordata
- Class: Reptilia
- Clade: Pseudosuchia
- Family: †Rauisuchidae
- Genus: †Teratosaurus; Meyer, 1861

Type species
- †Teratosaurus suevicus Meyer, 1861

= Teratosaurus =

Teratosaurus Temporal range: Late Triassic, 216–204 Ma

Extinct genus of reptiles

Teratosaurus is a genus of rauisuchians known from the late Triassic Stubensandstein (Löwenstein Formation, Norian stage) of Germany. It is estimated to be 6.2 m (20 ft) in length.

== Discovery ==
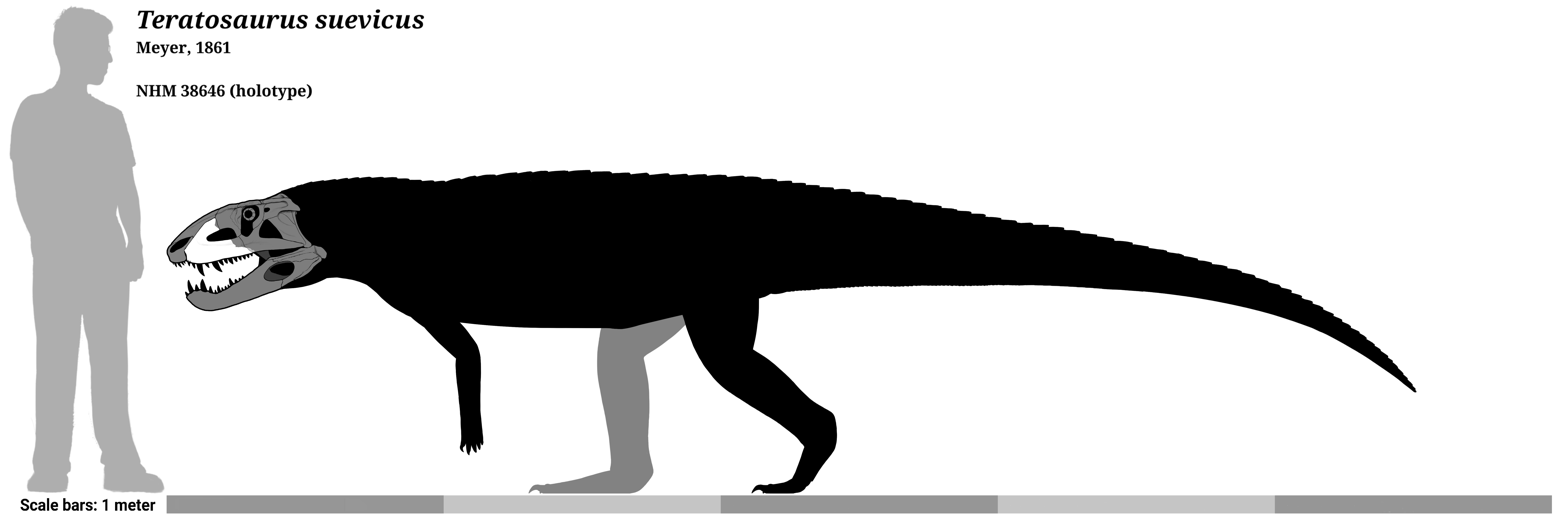
Size comparison, silhouette based in Postosuchus

In 1860, Sixt Friedrich Jakob von Kapff at the Heslacher Wand near Stuttgart discovered the upper jaw bone of a large reptile. The type specimen, which Hermann von Meyer declared to be distinct from Belodon, was described and named by the latter as the type species Teratosaurus suevicus. The generic name is derived from Greek τέρας, teras, "[ominous birth of a] monster" and sauros, "lizard". The specific name refers to Suevia. The holotype, specimen NHMUK PV OR 38646, was found in the Mittlerer Stubensandstein. It consists of a 245 millimetres long right maxilla with six large, up to five centimetres long, teeth, erroneously interpreted by Meyer as the left maxilla. It indicates a body length of about six metres.

Later authors, such as Kapff himself, von Huene, Osborn, and Edwin H. Colbert, incorrectly attributed postcrania of the sauropodomorph dinosaur Efraasia to this species or genus and, as a result, it was thought to be a representative of a presumed group of carnivorous Prosauropoda or, alternatively, a very primitive theropod. Following this lead, many popular books in the 20th century depicted "teratosaurs" as the earliest sort of large-bodied meat-eating dinosaur, walking on two legs and preying on the prosauropods of its day. It was thought by many to be a Triassic ancestor to the "carnosaurs" of the Jurassic. Sauropodomorph material was described as Teratosaurus species such as Teratosaurus minor (now Efraasia) and Teratosaurus trossingensis.

Life restoration

In 1985 and 1986, Peter Galton and Michael Benton independently showed that Teratosaurus is actually a rauisuchian, a type of non-dinosaurian large predatory archosaur, many of which walked on all fours, and lived alongside dinosaurs during the Late Triassic.

Apart from the holotype and the sauropodomorph fossils, teeth probably belonging to various carnivorous archosaurs were named as Teratosaurus species. These included Teratosaurus lloydi, a renaming of Cladeiodon lloydi (Owen 1841) by Huene in 1908, and Teratosaurus bengalensis. Teratosaurus silesiacus, described in 2005 by Tomasz Sulej on the basis of a left maxilla, was transferred to the genus Polonosuchus by Brussatte et al. in 2009.
