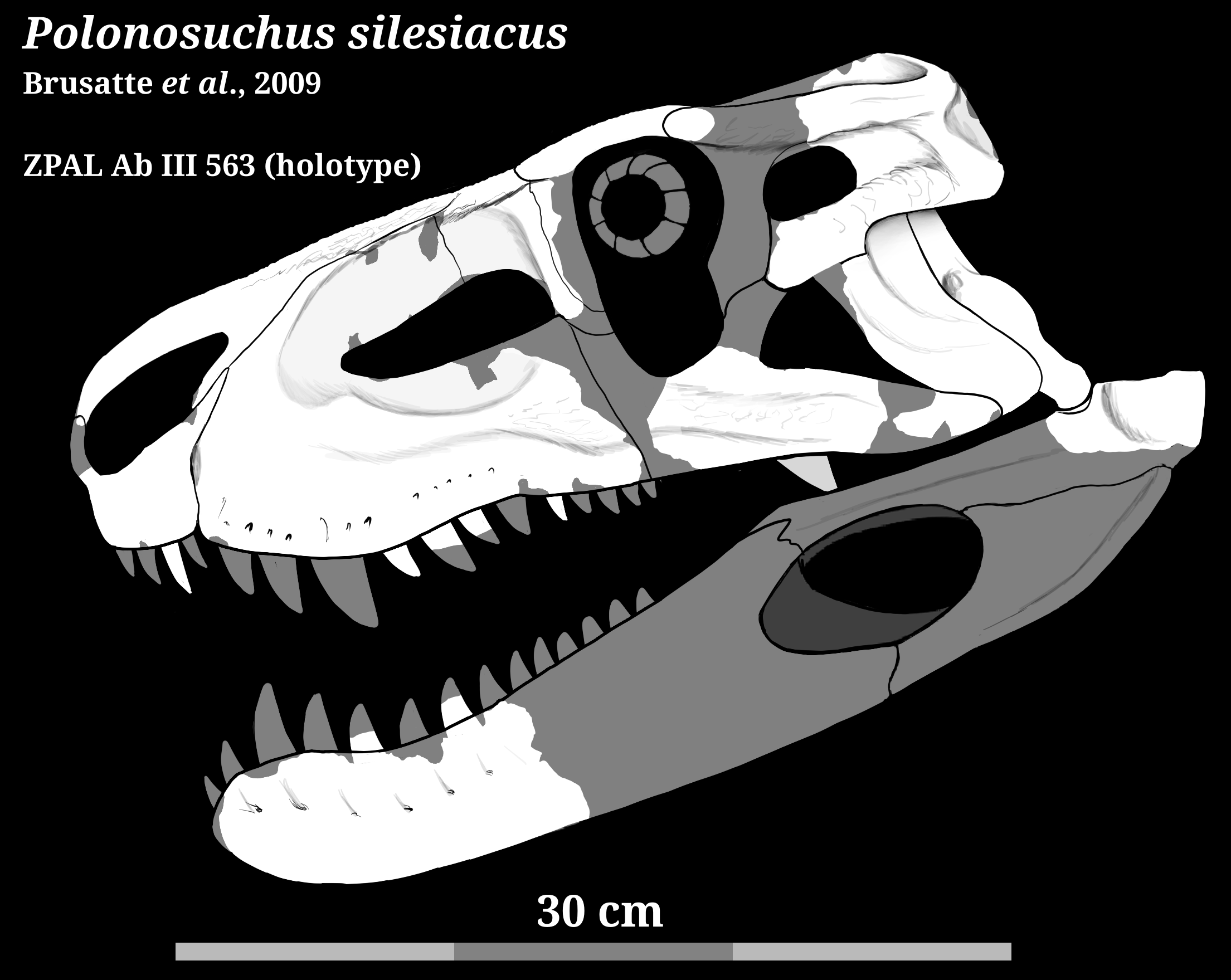
- Skull diagram
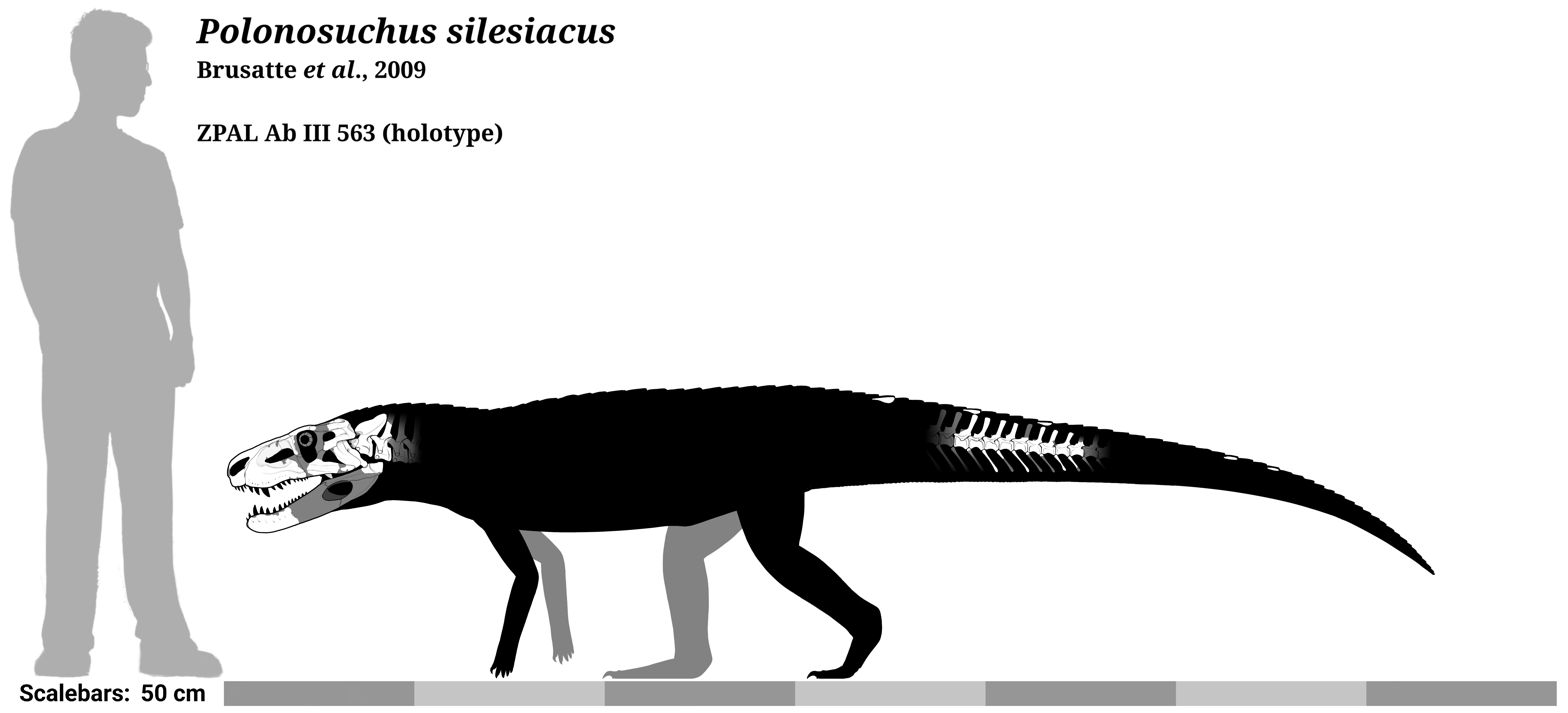
- Skeletal reconstruction and size comparison, showcasing known bones

Scientific classification
- Kingdom: Animalia
- Phylum: Chordata
- Class: Reptilia
- Clade: Pseudosuchia
- Clade: Loricata
- Family: †Rauisuchidae
- Genus: †Polonosuchus; Brusatte et al., 2009

Species
- †P. silesiacus Sulej, 2005 (originally Teratosaurus silesiacus) (type)

= Polonosuchus =

Polonosuchus Temporal range: Late Triassic, 237–227 Ma

Extinct genus of reptiles

Polonosuchus is a genus of rauisuchid known from the late Triassic (Carnian age) of Poland. It was a predator equipped with a large head of long sharp teeth. The legs were placed almost underneath the body, unlike most reptiles, which would have made it quite fast and a powerful runner. The appearance was very similar to that of the more known Postosuchus, of North America, and shared with the latter the ecological niche of the apex predator.

== Discovery ==
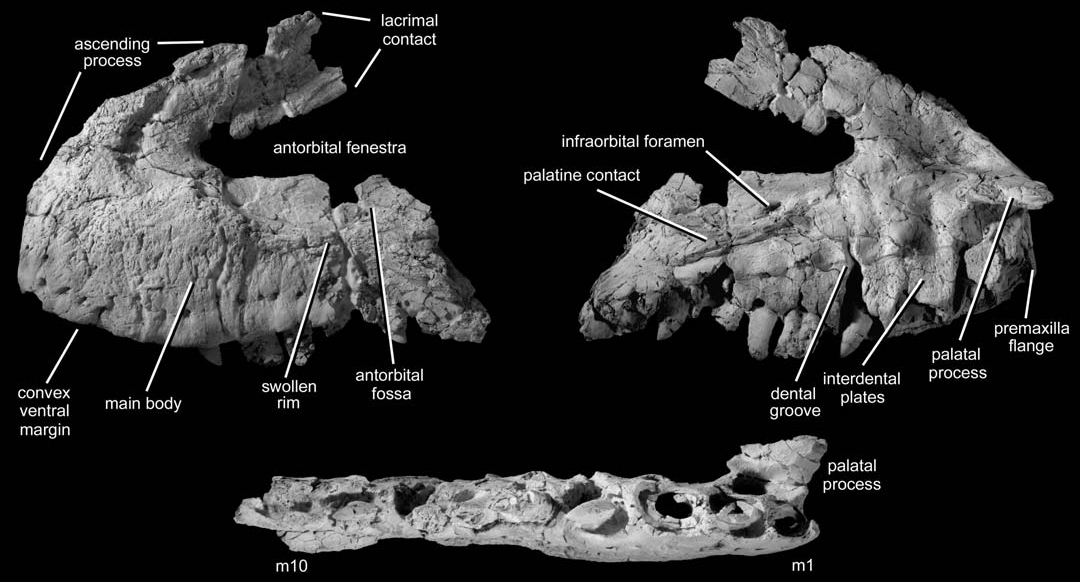
Left maxilla.

It was described as Teratosaurus silesiacus in 2005 by Tomasz Sulej, and was transferred to the genus Polonosuchus by Brusatte et al. in 2009. However, it is still considered closely related to the remaining Teratosaurus species, Teratosaurus suevicus. In Polonosuchus, the rostromedial foramen is on the medial surface of the maxilla, and the foramina for replacement teeth are not connected by a dental groove but are set together in a straight line, unlike in Teratosaurus. It also had a larger first dental alveolus than Teratosaurus, no different in size from alveoli 2-4, smaller overall maxillae (165 mm as opposed to 245 mm), and a large ridge between the palatal process and the dental alveoli which is not present in Teratosaurus at all.

== Description ==
The holotype, and only known specimen, is fragmentary. From the skull are preserved both maxillae, premaxillae, nasals, prefrontals, palatines and quadrates, the left jugal, the right pterygoid, quadratojugal, surangular, articular, squamosal and lacrimal, and fragments of the dentary. There are also the first three cervical vertebrae, nine caudal vertebrae, some caudal scutes and fragments of cervical ribs.

=== Skull ===
The maxillae are tall and laterally compressed, forming most of the borders of the antorbital fenestra (visible on the photo above). The palatal process extends anteroventrally and is very short. A ridge extending to form a suture with the palatine is present above the sixth, seventh and eighth dental alveoli. Small infraorbital foramina are located around the edge of the antorbital fenestra, near the teeth. At least eleven dental alveoli were present, although the total is not certain as both maxillae are broken off at the posterior ends. Small replacement teeth are visible above some of the alveoli, indicating it was probably a polyphyodont.

The premaxillae are very similar to those of Postosuchus, but slightly smaller; the posterodorsal process is broken off, but sutures present on the nasal bones show it would have extended all the way up to the anterior border of the naris. The palatal processes of the premaxillae are incompletely preserved, but would almost certainly have articulated with those of the maxillae. There are certainly four alveoli present, with a small cavity which may be a fifth.

The nasals have a long dorsoventrally compressed process which would have extended down between the maxilla and premaxilla. They also have a long anterior process with a triangular cross-section. The surface for articulation with the lacrimal is clearly visible on the right nasal.

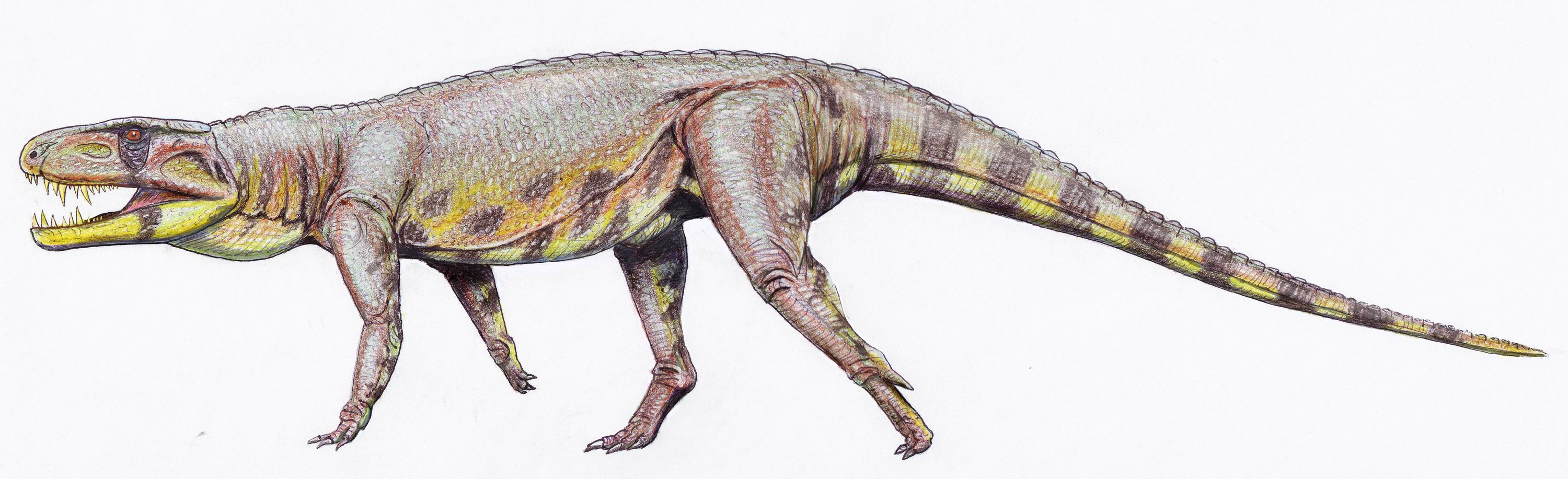
Restoration

The lacrimal has a thick rugose ridge extending back from that on the nasal. Its lamellar part forms the posterodorsal border of the antorbital fenestra, and is articulated with the maxillae which form much of the rest of the borders. There is also a descending process of the lacrimal which forms most of the posterior border of the antorbital fenestra, with a noticeably striated ridge. This descending process would probably have contacted the jugal at its ventral end.

The prefrontals are large triangular plates which overhang the orbits, with rugose lateral surfaces. All the surfaces which articulate with the other bones of the skull roof are narrow and oblique.

The squamosal has five projections. Two of these bordered the superior temporal fenestra and met with the parietal and postorbital, which are not known. A hook-like ventral projection would have met the quadrate head, and a lateral projection would have overhung the quadratojugal. The fifth projection is broken off and missing.

Much of the jugal is preserved, although not the anterior or ascending processes. The posterior process has straight margins. The ascending process had a triangular cross-section at the base, where it articulates with the pterygoid. The quadratojugal is only partial, with a broken dorsal edge. Its process for articulating with the quadrate is clearly visible, and that for the jugal is long and indented.

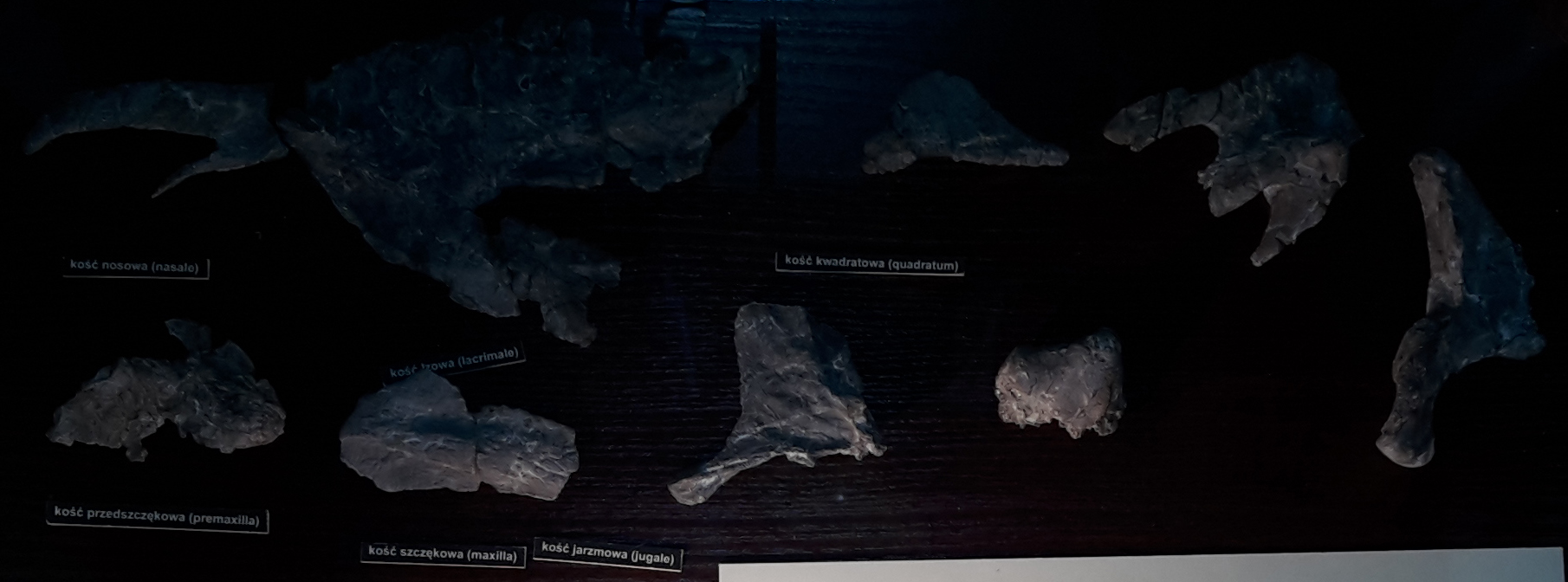
Skull bones

The palatines have a robust anterior and fragile posterior. Relative to their overall length, the region between the choanae and the suborbital fossae is very long. An oblique vertical wall rises from the dorsal surface, separating part of the nasal fossa. There are two ridges which cross on the ventral surface.

The pterygoid has a missing anterior ramus. Its posteroventral ramus has missing parts, but the centre is preserved and exhibits a cleft for the ectopterygoid. The quadrate ramus extends back with a narrow shelf on the ventral side. A small facet at its base forms part of the articulation with the basisphenoid, which is common for Triassic archosaurs.

The quadrate has a rounded dorsal head which contacts the squamosal, and a high and narrow pterygoid ramus. There is a strong posterior ridge along the quadrate's main axis. Above the two parts of the mandibular condyle, there is a well-defined facet for articulation with the quadratojugal.

The anterior parts of the dentary are preserved, up to the first eight teeth. The lateral faces bear a series of vascular foramina.

The articular and surangular are fragmentary, and one of the few features preserved is a foramen for a branch of the facial nerve.

=== Vertebrae ===
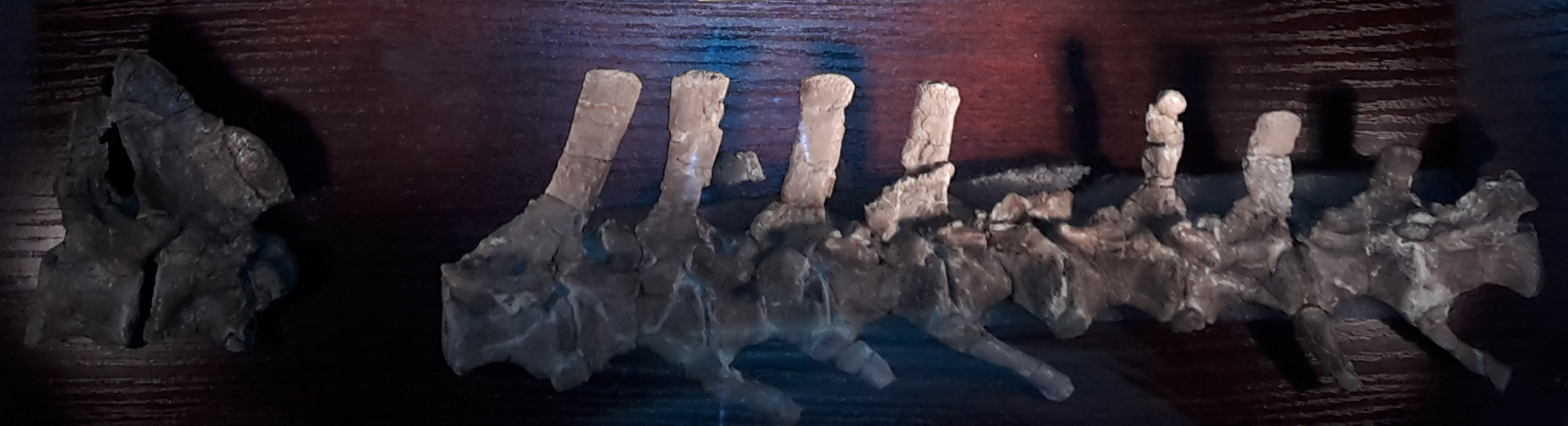
Vertebrae

The centrum of the atlas vertebra is the only part preserved, and has a crescent shape and rounded anterior surface. The other two vertebrae have centra longer than they are tall. The axis has a triangular neural spine and relatively small prezygapophyses, at least compared to the stout postzygapophyses. The third cervical vertebra has an incomplete neural spine and equally sized post- and prezygapophyses. The caudal vertebrae have pronounced facets for the haemal arches, and tall plate-like neural spines. The centra have smooth convex ventral surfaces, and as the vertebrae are fairly large, they probably come from the anterior part of the tail.

=== Dermal armour ===
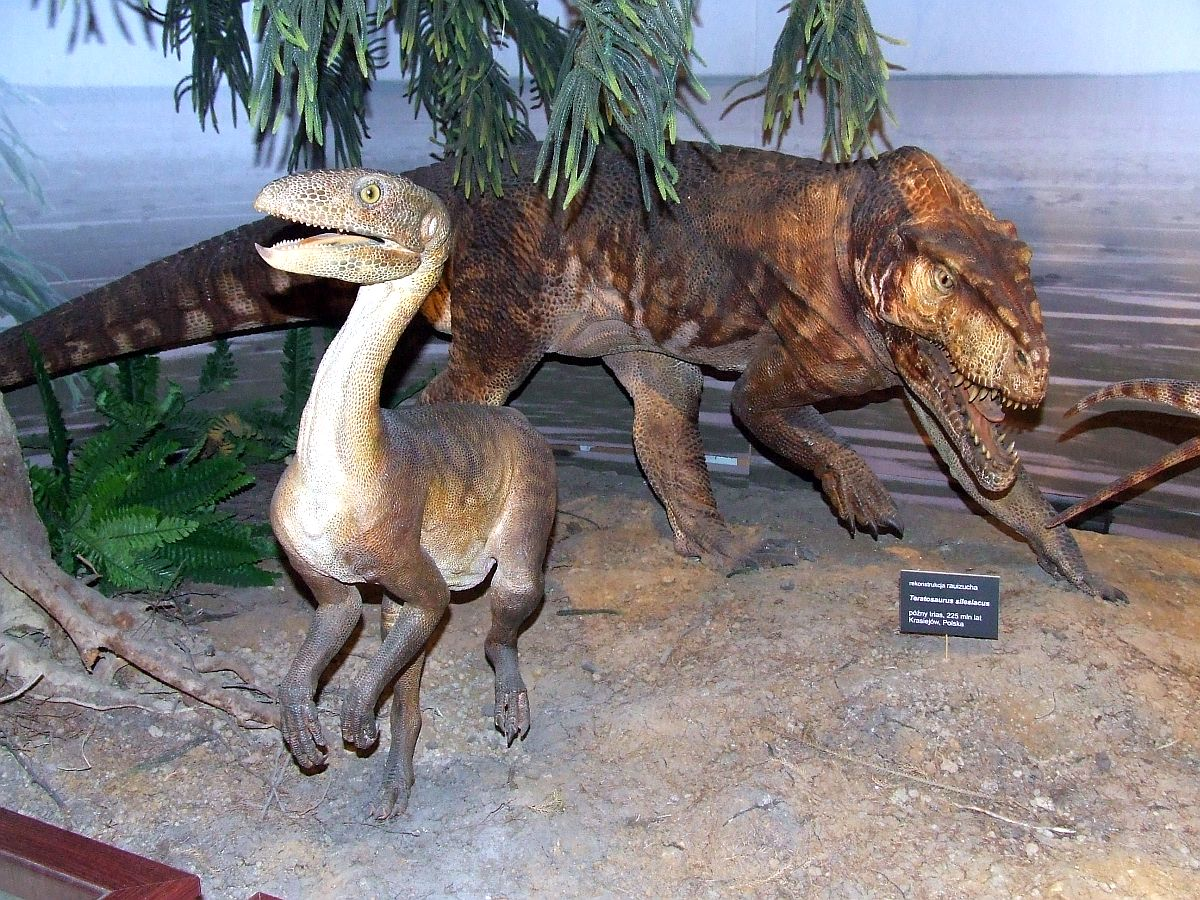
Silesaurus and Polonosuchus models in Poland

Five dermal scutes were found close to the caudal vertebrae, indicating that they are probably from the tail. The two largest are rectangular and have articulatory processes, indicating that they would have overlapped and linked together. The three smaller plates are leaf-shaped and their articulatory processes are in a different place, indicating the presence of at least two distinct rows of medial dermal armour.
