= Post Quarry =

Quarry site in Garza County, Texas

Field properties of the quarry

Post Quarry is a site located in Garza County, Texas. The Post Quarry yields an assemblage of bones from the Upper Triassic likely dating from 220 and 215 ma. containing bones from multiple taxa including the most well known rauisuchid named Postosuchus. The site was named after the Post Town in Texas, named after C. W. Post. There has been rare finds of dinosauriforms discovered in the quarry being both non dinosaurian dinosauriforms and early dinosaurs.

== Taxons discovered in the Post Quarry ==
- Rileymillerus cosgriffi
- Apachesaurus gregorii
- Trilophosaurus dornorum
- Leptosuchus
- Calyptosuchus wellesi
- Typothorax coccinarum
- Paratypothorax
- Desmatosuchus smalli
- Shuvosaurus inexpectatus
- Postosuchus kirkpatricki
- Dromomeron gregorii
- Technosaurus smalli
