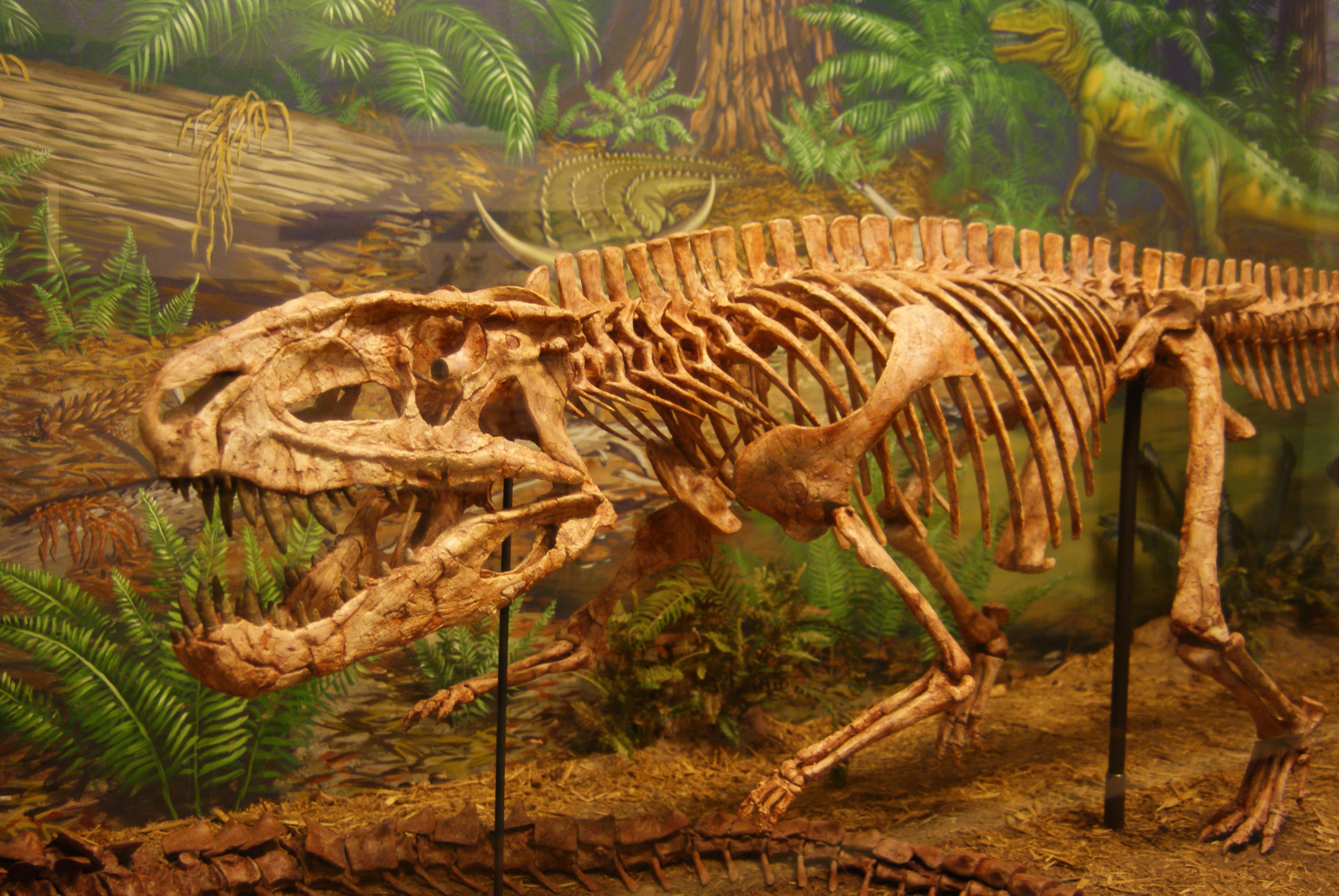
- Mounted skeleton of Postosuchus kirkpatricki in the Museum of Texas Tech University

Scientific classification
- Kingdom: Animalia
- Phylum: Chordata
- Class: Reptilia
- Clade: Pseudosuchia
- Clade: Loricata
- Family: †Rauisuchidae; Huene, 1942

Genera
- †Arganasuchus?; †Etjosuchus?; †Fenhosuchus?; †Jushatyria?; †Polonosuchus; †Postosuchus; †Procerosuchus?; †Rauisuchus; †Scolotosuchus; †Teratosaurus; †Tikisuchus?; †Vivaron; †Vjushkovisaurus?; †Vytshegdosuchus?

Synonyms
- Teratosauridae Cope, 1871

= Rauisuchidae =

Rauisuchids Temporal range: Middle–Late Triassic Possible Early Triassic record

Extinct family of reptiles

Rauisuchidae is a group of large (up to 6 metres (20 ft)) predatory Triassic archosaurs. Some disagreement exists over which genera should be included in the Rauisuchidae and which should be in the related Prestosuchidae and Poposauridae, and indeed whether these should even be thought of as separate valid families. Rauisuchidae in the modern sense was defined by Sterling Nesbitt in 2011 as the most inclusive clade containing Rauisuchus tiradentes, but not Prestosuchus chiniquensis, Poposaurus gracilis, or Crocodylus niloticus (the Nile crocodile). In this modern sense, rauisuchids are recovered as members of the clade Loricata, being the sister taxon of Crocodylomorpha (the group including living crocodilians), and being more derived than taxa such as Prestosuchus and Batrachotomus. Rauisuchids occurred throughout much of the Triassic, and may have first occurred in the Early Triassic if some archosaurian taxa such as Scythosuchus and Tsylmosuchus are considered to be within the family.

An early cladistic analysis of crocodylotarsan (pseudosuchian) archosaurs included Lotosaurus, Fasolasuchus, Rauisuchus, and "the Kupferzell rauisuchid" (later called Batrachotomus) within the Rauisuchidae. However, a later study found that Batrachotomus was a more basal pseudosuchian only slightly more "advanced" than Prestosuchus. In addition, the toothless Lotosaurus has been found to be more closely related to the Ctenosauriscidae, a clade of poposauroids with sails on their backs.

Two genera, previously classified as poposaurids, are in fact rauisuchids. These include Teratosaurus and Postosuchus.

== Genera ==
Genus	Status	Age	Location	Unit	Notes	Images
Arganasuchus?	Valid	Late Triassic	Morocco		Named for the Moroccan fossil site where it was discovered, the Argana Basin. Its phylogenetic placement is uncertain.	
Etjosuchus?	Valid	Ladinian-Carnian	Namibia	Omigonde Formation	Placement uncertain, may be a basal loricatan	
Fenhosuchus?	Valid	Anisian	China		May be a chimera of fossils from the erythrosuchid Shansisuchus and an indeterminate archosaur.	
Jushatyria?	Valid	Ladinian	Russia		Placement uncertain	
Polonosuchus	Valid	Carnian	Poland			
Postosuchus	Valid	Late Triassic	US	Chinle Formation Newark Supergroup	One of the most well-known genera of Rauisuchidae	
Procerosuchus?	Valid	Carnian	Brazil	Santa Maria Formation	Placement uncertain	
Rauisuchus	Valid	Late Triassic	Brazil			
Scolotosuchus	Valid	Olenekian	Russia	Lipovskaya Formation		
Teratosaurus	Valid	Norian - Rhaetian	Germany	Löwenstein Formation	Once considered an early carnosaurian dinosaur	
Tikisuchus?	Valid	Late Triassic	India	Tiki Formation	Placement uncertain	
Vivaron	Valid	Norian	US	Chinle Formation		
Vjushkovisaurus?	Valid	Anisian	Russia		May be an erythrosuchid	
Vytshegdosuchus?	Valid	Olenekian	Russia		Placement uncertain	
