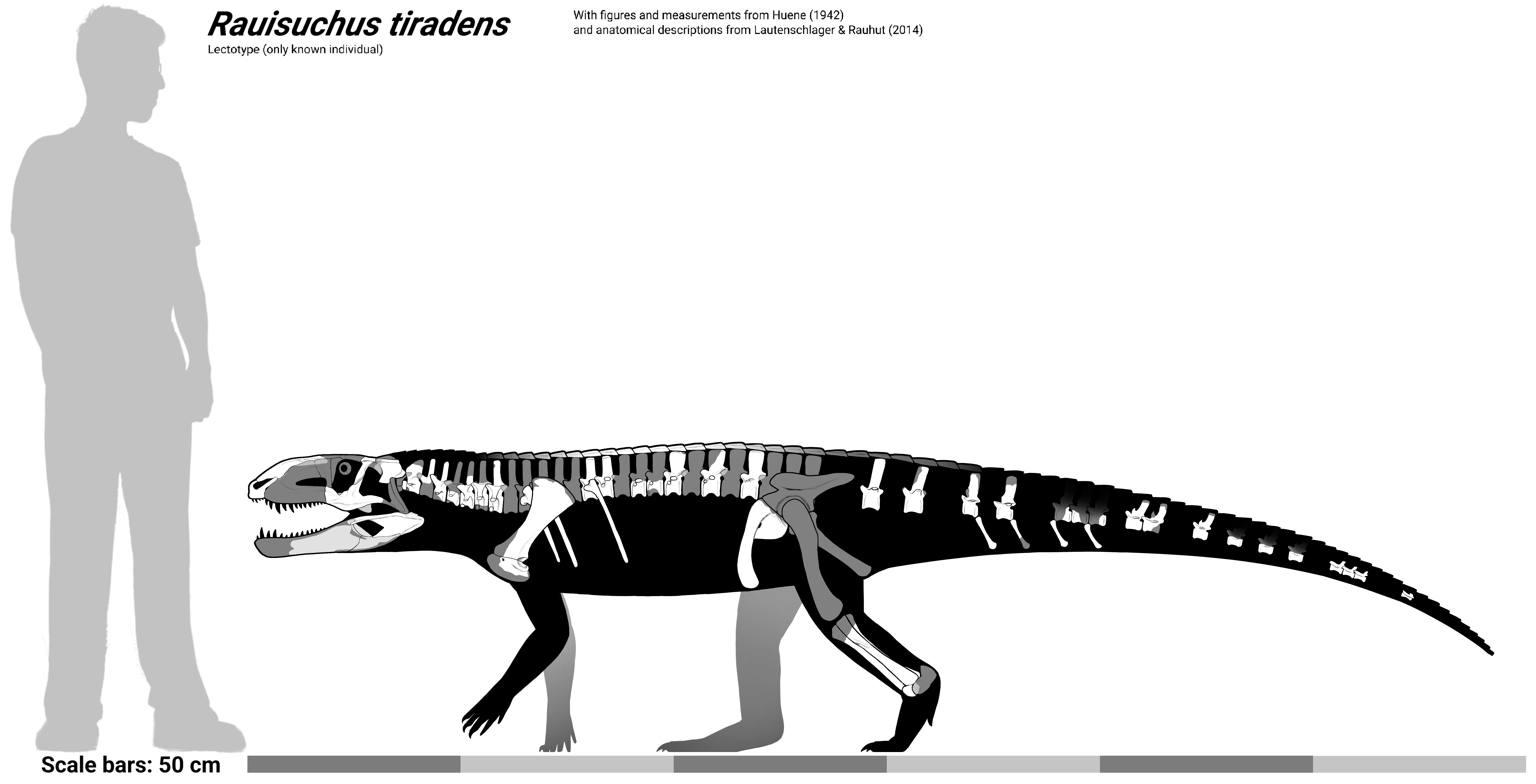
- Skeletal reconstruction and size comparison
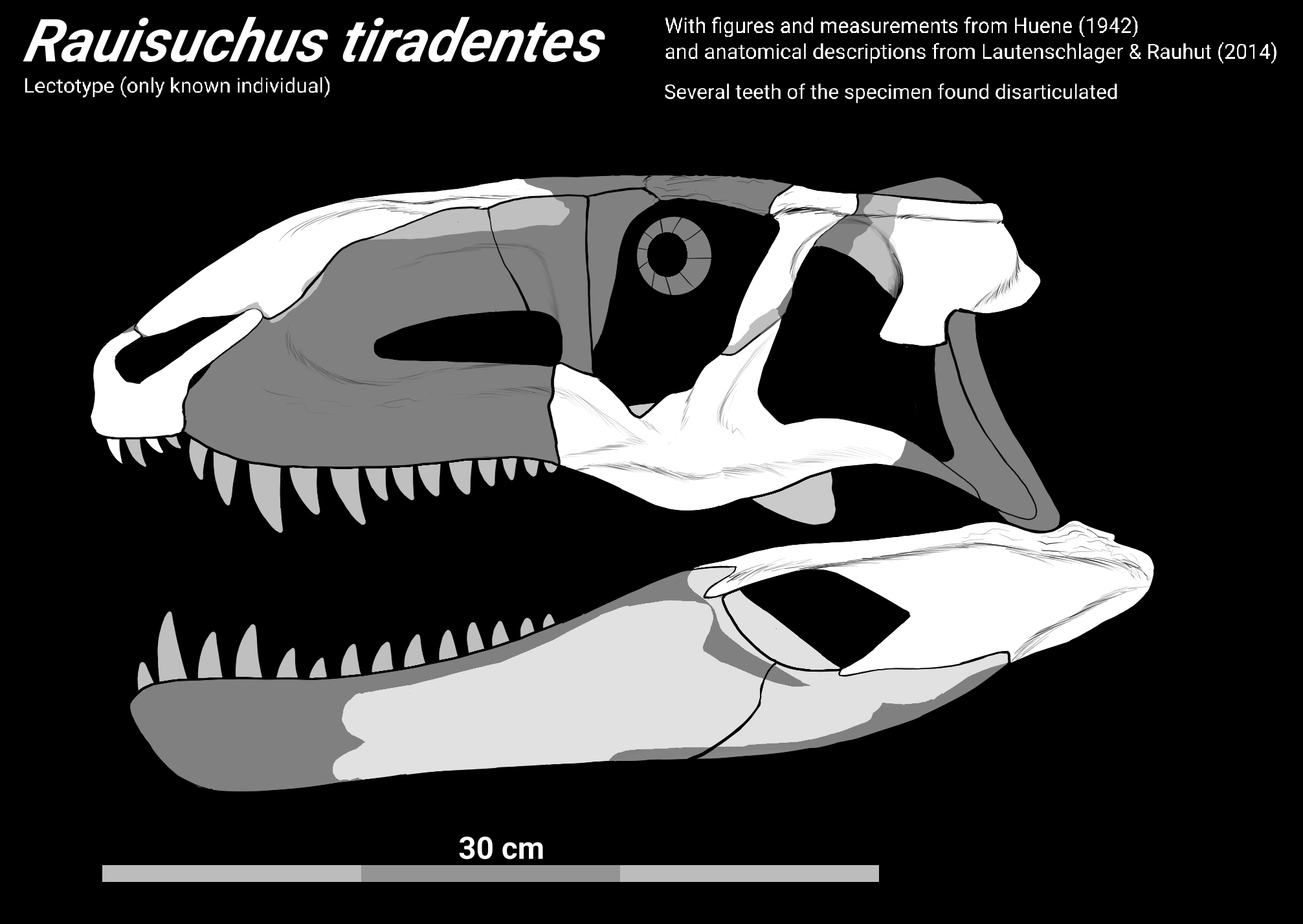
- Skull diagram

Scientific classification
- Kingdom: Animalia
- Phylum: Chordata
- Class: Reptilia
- Clade: Pseudosuchia
- Family: †Rauisuchidae
- Genus: †Rauisuchus von Huene, 1936
- Species: †R. tiradentes

Binomial name
- †Rauisuchus tiradentes von Huene, 1936 vide von Huene, 1942

= Rauisuchus =

Rauisuchus Temporal range: Late Triassic ~235–228 Ma

Genus of extinct archosaurs

Rauisuchus (meaning "Wilhelm Rau's crocodile") is a genus of extinct archosaurs which lived in what is now the Geopark of Paleorrota (Santa María Formation), Brazil, during the Late Triassic period (235–228 million years ago). It contains one species, R. tiradentes.

== Discovery and naming ==
In 1928 or 1929, near the road from Santa Maria to San Jose, Dr. Wilhelm Rau, a German fossil collector working under Friedrich von Huene, discovered the remains of a rauisuchid crocodile. He made the discovery some 20–30 metres (66–98 ft) from the road at a site known as the Zahnsanga, which was likely a ravine or escarpment parallel to the road. The Zahnsanga site was part of the Alemoa Member of the Santa Maria Formation and was found in the uppermost 2.5 metres (8.2 ft) of an 8 metres (26 ft) layer. von Huene then sent the R. tiradentes material back to Germany alongside other fossils, including the holotype of Prestosuchus chiniquensis.

von Huene (1936) named Rauisuchus in a list of the Thecodontia, but no diagnosis or description was given, so it remained a nomen dubium until being properly described by von Huene (1942).

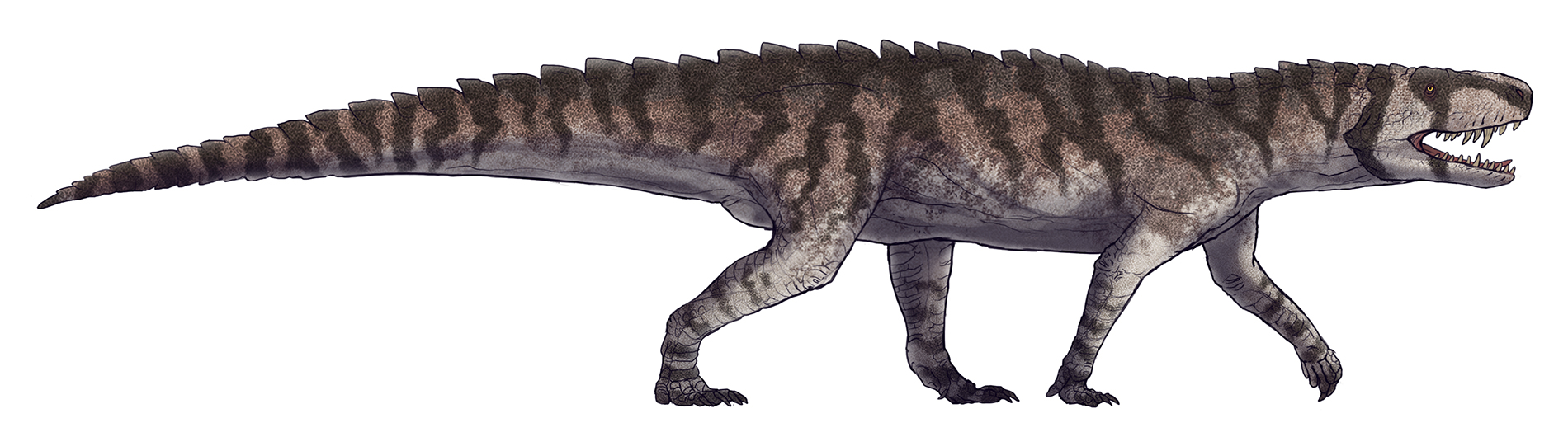
Life reconstruction

Krebs (1973) described the tarsus of R. tiradentes and the lectotype was assigned in 1976 and consists of BSPG AS XXV 60–68, 71–100, 105–119 and 121 (the right premaxilla, right postorbital, left squamosal, left jugal, right pterygoid, right nasal, both splenials, left surangular, prearticular and angular, odontoid(?), axis, cervical, dorsal and caudal vertebrae, ribs, chevron bones, right scapulacoracoid, left pubis, right tibia, fibula and astragalus, and body osteoderms). It is unclear if the lectotype remains belonged to one or two individuals.

The specimens found by Rau were eventually re-described by Lautenschlager & Rauhut (2014) and they identified that from Localities 15-17, one or two specimens were found. According to von Huene (1942), 'Find 1025' was assigned to BSPG AS XXV 122 (a partial left maxilla) and 'Find 1020' was assigned to BSPG AS XXV 123 (a cervical vertebra), BSPG AS XXV 124, (a rib fragment), BSPG AS XXV 120 and BSPG, no number (two chevron bone fragments) and BSPG AS XXV 88 (a complete left ilium). Lautenschlager & Rauhut (2014) found that the remains from Locality 15 ('Find 1020') could not be diagnostically assigned to Rauisuchus, and so were removed from the genus. They also noted that von Huene (1942) assigned two more specimens from other localities to R. tiradentes: several isolated teeth, BSPG AS XXV 101 (the proximal end of an ulna) and BSPG AS XXV 102 (a partial metatarsal), but these cannot be confidently assigned to R. tiradentes as no overlapping material is known.

== Description ==
Rauisuchus is distinguished from other members of the Rauisuchidae on the basis of a knob-like thickening on the base of the posterior process of the premaxilla, short, ventrally keeled cervicals, lacking postzygodiapophyseal laminae, and elongated caudals with an accessory neural spine and a postspinal lamina.

== Classification ==
Rauisuchus belonged to a group of land-dwelling relatives to crocodiles known as the Rauisuchidae, although it was initially assigned to the Theriodontia in 1936. Rauisuchids were among the top predators of their day, eating other reptiles for food and maybe hunting early dinosaurs.

It was placed as the sister taxon to Tikisuchus and Yarasuchus, forming a clade with the two.
