= Tikisuchus =

Tikisuchus Temporal range: Late Triassic, 237–228 Ma

Scientific classification
- Kingdom: Animalia
- Phylum: Chordata
- Class: Reptilia
- Clade: Pseudosuchia
- Family: †Rauisuchidae
- Genus: †Tikisuchus; Chatterjee and Majumdar, 1987
- Species: †T. romeri

Binomial name
- †Tikisuchus romeri Chatterjee and Majumdar, 1987

Extinct genus of reptiles

Tikisuchus is an extinct genus of rauisuchid archosauromorph. It is known from the Late Triassic Tiki Formation in the Shahdol District of central India and was the first rauisuchid to have been found in Asia. The horizon from which remains have been found is Carnian in age. The type species is T. romeri, named in honor of American paleontologist Alfred Romer. Romer was present at the Tiki locality during the excavation of the fossil, but died before the description of the genus in 1987. Tikisuchus is known only from one specimen, called ISI R 305, which consists of the skull and some postcranial elements of a young individual.

== Description ==
Compared to other rausuchids, the skull of Tikisuchus was very large. The skull's length is around 40% of the length of the presacral area between the head and the sacrum. The skull is deep, being wide at the back with a narrow rostrum. The teeth are large, recurved and serrated. Like other rauisuchids, it has rows of osteoderms, or bony scutes, along its back. There are two rows of osteoderms. Each osteoderm is rectangular in shape and imbricates, or articulates tightly, with the ones around it. In other rauisuchids, the osteoderms are leaf-shaped rather than rectangular.

== Paleobiology ==
Many other tetrapods were found in association with Tikisuchus representing a diverse Carnian paleofauna. Tetrapods from the Tiki site include Paleorhinus, a phytosaur, Metoposaurus, a temnospondyl, and Paradapedon, a rhynchosaur. The Tiki fauna is similar to that of the German Keuper.

Theropod dinosaurs were also present in the Tiki Formation. Both Tikisuchus and the theropods were large terrestrial predators, and, having been found at the same locality, likely came in close contact with one another. The similar lifestyles of the two carnivores may have resulted in competition for the same food sources. Possible prey would have included rhynchosaurs, trilophosaurs, dicynodonts, and aetosaurs. The authors of the original description of Tikisuchus, Sankar Chatterjee and Pranab Majumdar, suggested that competition between Tikisuchus and theropods was low because of abundant food resources and stabilized ecological interactions. Chatterjee and Majumdar thought that there was an "ecological balance" during the Carnian stage on the basis of little change in the paleofauna of the time. They considered the paleoclimate to have been warm with seasonal wet and dry seasons conducive to the growth of tropical forests. At the end of the Carnian, however, the authors claimed that many prey resources became extinct and the forest environment was replaced by a more open environment. The limited resources would have heightened competition between theropods and rauisuchids like Tikisuchus. Chatterjee and Majumdar considered theropods to be agile pursuit predators while rauisuchids were considered slow ambush predators. Therefore, they suggested that theropods, which were more suited to living in an open environment, outcompeted rauisuchids at the end of the Triassic to become the dominant large land carnivores by the beginning of the Jurassic. However, more recent studies suggest that dinosaurs gained dominance only after the Triassic-Jurassic extinction event in a case of opportunism with no other large archosaurs such as rauisuchids to compete with.
