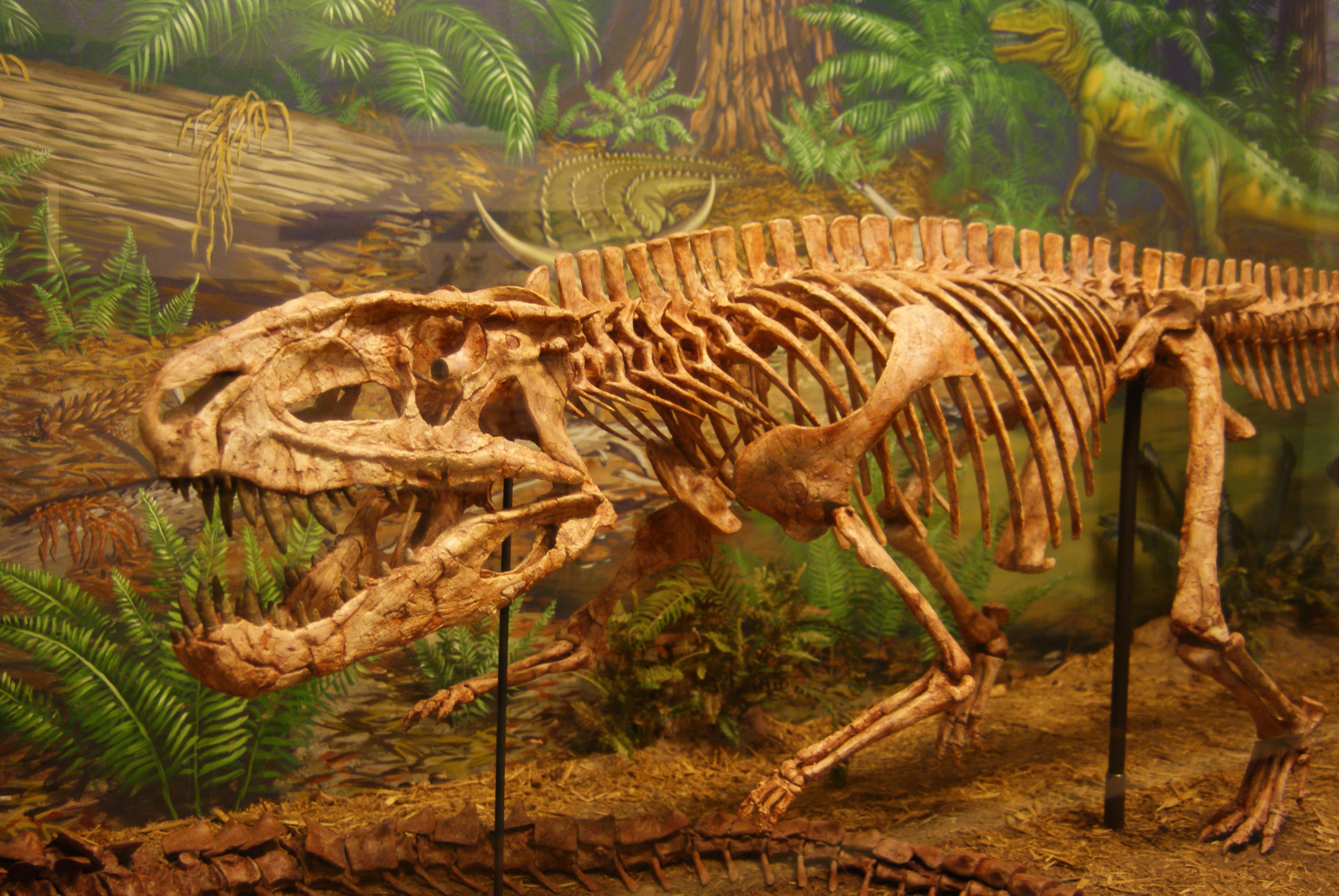
- Skeleton at the Museum of Texas Tech University, near Post, Texas

Scientific classification
- Kingdom: Animalia
- Phylum: Chordata
- Class: Reptilia
- Clade: Pseudosuchia
- Family: †Rauisuchidae
- Genus: †Postosuchus; Chatterjee, 1985

Type species
- †Postosuchus kirkpatricki Chatterjee, 1985

Species
- †P. kirkpatricki Chatterjee, 1985; †P. alisonae Peyer et al., 2008

= Postosuchus =

Postosuchus Temporal range: Late Triassic (Norian)

Genus of reptiles

Postosuchus (meaning "crocodile from Post") is an extinct genus of rauisuchid that lived in what is now North America during the Late Triassic. The genus comprises two species, P. kirkpatricki and P. alisonae, and belongs to the clade Pseudosuchia, the archosaur lineage that includes modern crocodilians. The name refers to Post Quarry in Texas, where numerous fossils of the type species, P. kirkpatricki, were discovered. Pseudosuchia is one of the two major archosaur lineages, the other being Avemetatarsalia, which includes birds and their extinct relatives.

Postosuchus was one of the apex predators of its region during the Triassic, exceeding contemporary small predatory dinosaurs such as Coelophysis in size. It likely preyed on large herbivores including dicynodonts, as well as small early dinosaurs. It had a robust skeleton, a deep skull and a long tail and reached an estimated length of 5–6 m (16–20 ft) or more. The disproportionate shortness of its forelimbs relative to its hind limbs and vertebral measurements suggest that Postosuchus may have been primarily bipedal.

== Description ==
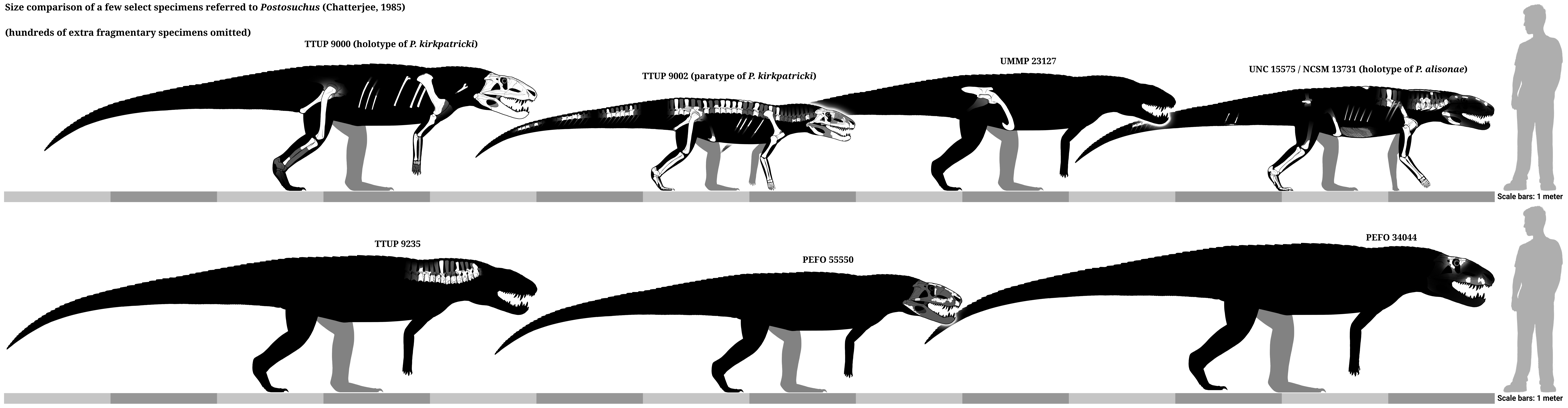
Size comparison of a few select different specimens assigned to the genus

Postosuchus was one of the largest carnivorous reptiles during the late Triassic. The neck of Postosuchus consists of at least eight cervical vertebrae followed by 16 dorsals, while two co-ossified sacral vertebrae supported the hips (it was previously described as four, but these were actually from Shuvosaurus). Along with remains of the skeleton, paleontologists also identified osteoderms, which were thick plates forming scales on its back, neck, and possibly above or under the tail. The pelvis with the hooked pubis and the rod-like ischium looked like those of carnosaurs. The ribcage of Postosuchus had typical archosaur structure, composed of large and slender, curved ribs.

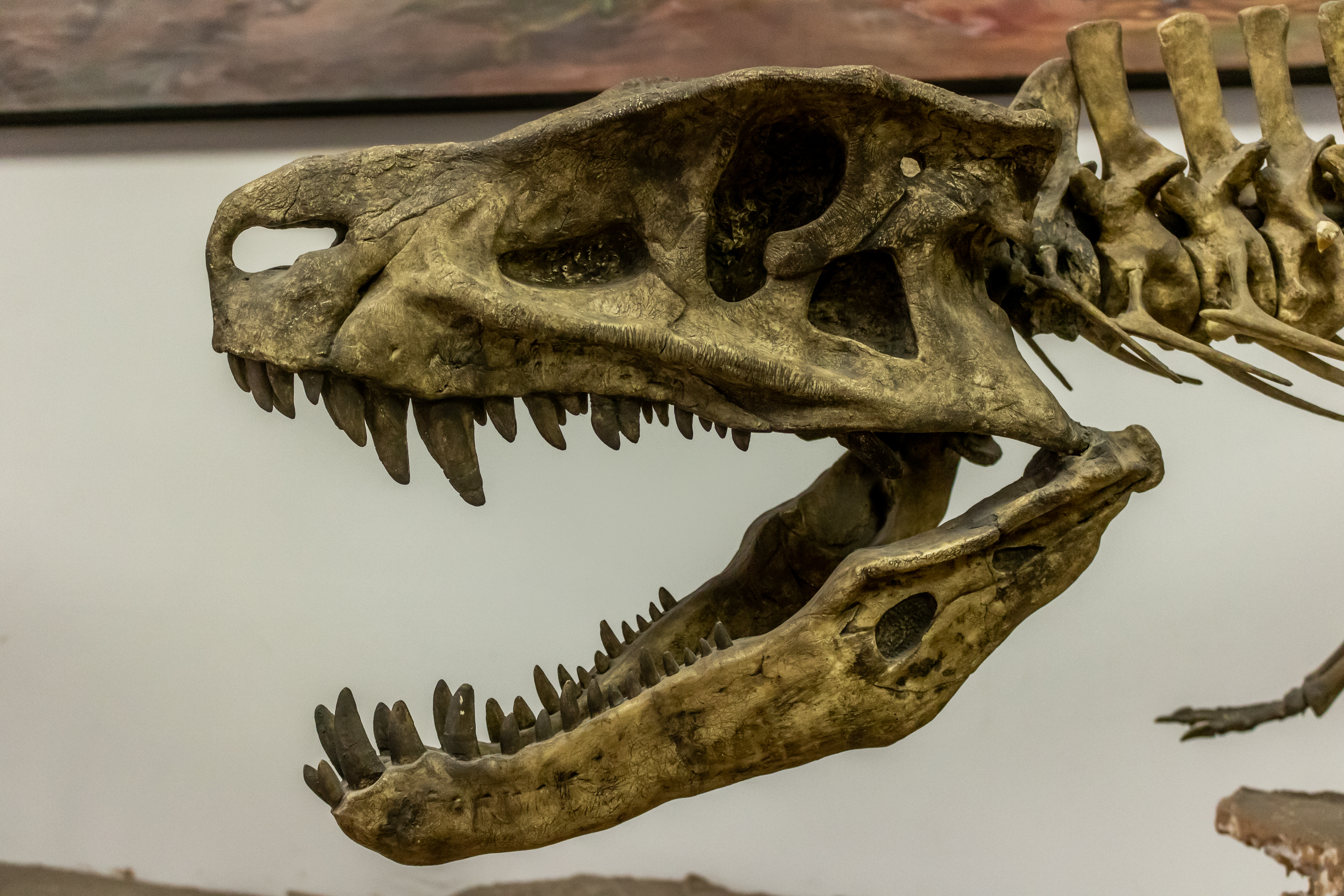
Skull cast

In some discoveries, ribs were found associated with gastralia, dermal bones located in the ventral region of the body.

=== Skull ===
Postosuchus had a massively built skull, bearing dagger-like teeth, which was constructed narrow in front, and extended wide and deep behind. The holotype skull was 55 cm in length and 21 cm broad and deep. Like more derived archosaurs, the lower jaw had mandibular fenestrae (at the lower jaw), formed by the junction of the dentary with other jaw bones (surangular and angular).

Inside the skull, under the nostrils, a hollow is seen that may have contained a Jacobson's organ, an olfactory sensory organ sometimes referred as the "sixth sense". The jaws held large and sharp, serrated teeth, of which some were developed even larger to operate as hooked sabers.

A complete tooth found among Postosuchus remains in North Carolina measured about 7.2 cm in height. Postosuchus possessed heterodonty dentition, which means each tooth was different in size and shape from the others. The upper jaw contained 17 teeth on each side, with each premaxilla bearing only four teeth and each maxilla 13 teeth. The lower jaw had over 30 teeth. Replacement activity in Postosuchus was different from that of crocodiles, since the replacement tooth did not fit directly in the pulp cavity of the old tooth, but grew until resorption of the old tooth was complete.

=== Limbs and posture ===
With the forelimbs being about 64% the size of the hind limbs, Postosuchus had small hands bearing five toes, of which only the first digit bore a claw. Due to the diminutive size of the hands, whether this claw was especially predominant in predation is uncertain, but it may have helped in grappling prey. The feet were much larger than the hands, with the fifth metatarsal forming a hook shape. As it was a crurotarsan, the heel and ankle of Postosuchus resemble those of modern crocodiles.

The limbs were located underneath the body, giving Postosuchus an upright stance. Historically, there has been debate over whether or not rauisuchids like Postosuchus were mainly bipedal or quadrupedal. Each one of Postosuchus' two forelimbs was slightly over half the size of the hind limbs. This characteristic of short fore limbs can usually be seen in bipedal reptiles. Chatterjee suggested that Postosuchus could walk in an erect stance, since the short fore limbs were probably used only during slow locomotion. In 1995, Robert Long and Phillip A. Murry argued that Postosuchus was heavily built and quadrupedal. Peyer et al., 2008, argued that the thick pectoral girdle served for locomotion of the fore limbs. They noted that this does not, however, detract from the theory that Postosuchus could also walk bipedally.

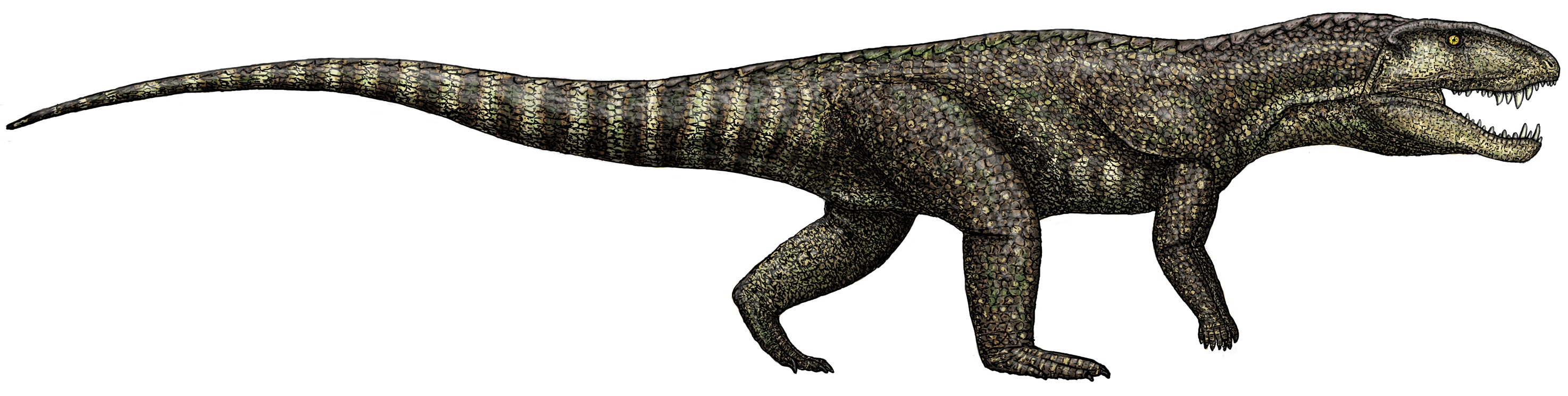
Life reconstruction

In 2013, a major study of the skeletal structure concluded that Postosuchus may have been an obligate biped based on the anatomy of the digits, vertebrae, and pelvis. The proportions of the limbs and weight-bearing sections of the spine were very similar to many theropod dinosaurs, nearly all of which are thought to have been strictly bipedal. However, a 2015 study noted several load-bearing adaptations present in the manus of Postosuchus, substantiating the view that its manus was used for support. A 2021 study looked at the influence of femur shape on archosaur posture and found conflicting results for Postosuchus: a larger femur specimen overlapped with fully bipedal archosaurs, while a smaller pair of femora overlapped with quadrupeds. In a 2022 article, Postosuchus was considered predominantly bipedal, but probably still capable of supporting its weight on the fore limbs at low speeds, and an ontogenetic shift was noted, with the shortening of the arms as individuals aged, suggesting that at least juveniles were facultatively quadrupedal, as the smaller paratype specimen (TTUP 9002, which is likely a juvenile) possesses proportionally larger arms then the presumably adult holotype (TTUP 9000).

== History ==
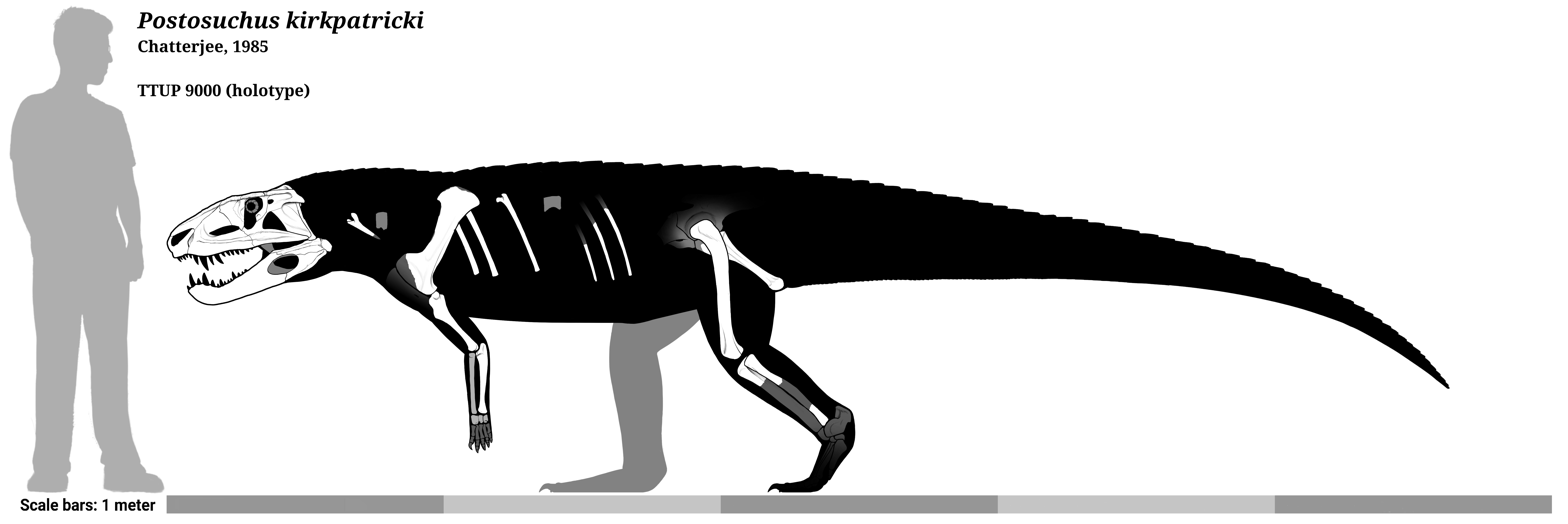
Size comparison and preserved elements of the holotype specimen (TTUP 9000)

=== Postosuchus kirkpatricki ===
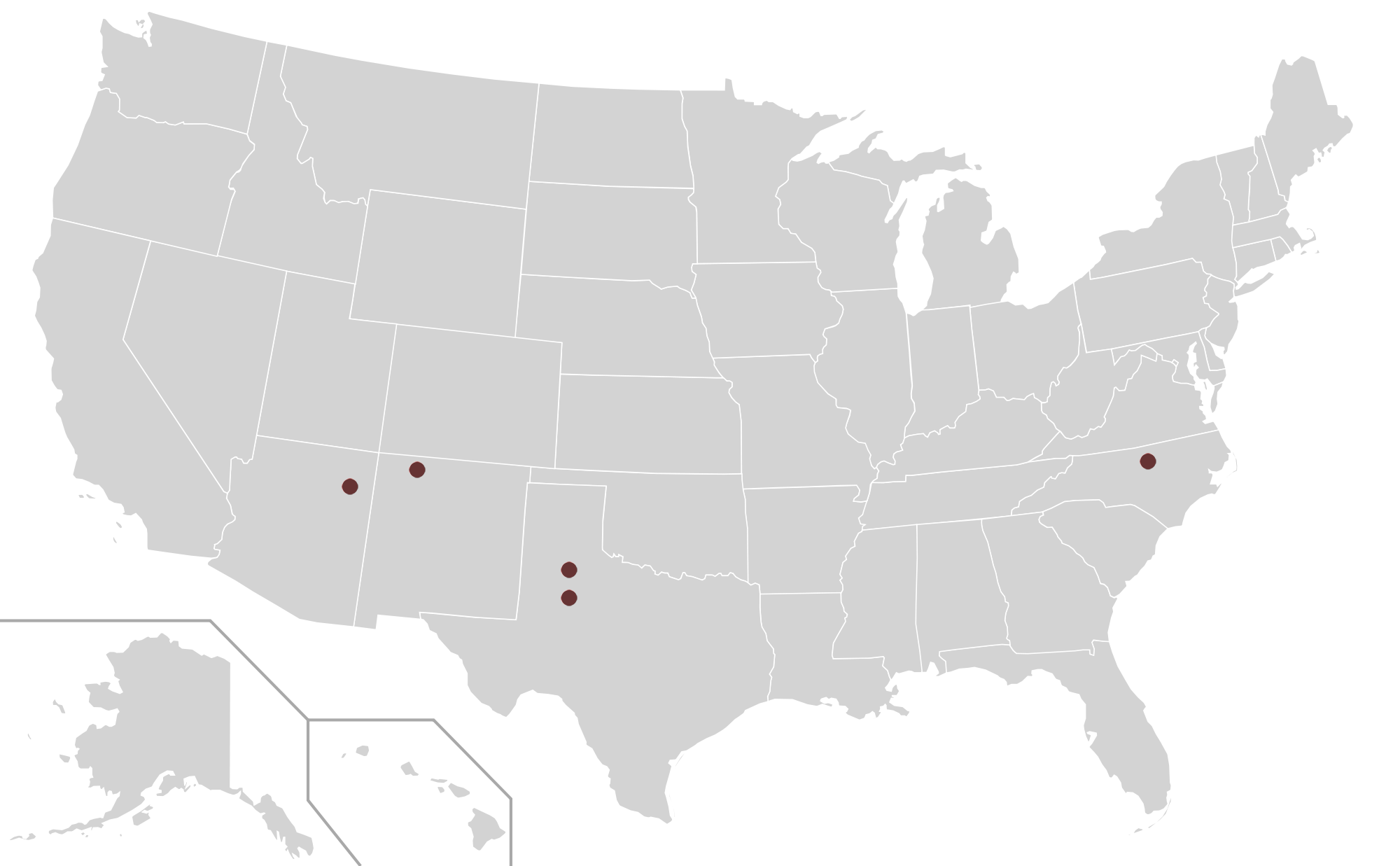
Postosuchus have been discovered only in the United States within the states of Arizona, New Mexico, North Carolina, and Texas.

During an expedition in 1980, paleontologists of the Texas Tech University discovered a new geological site rich in fossils near Post, Garza County, Texas, US, where a dozen well-preserved specimens belonging to a new rauisuchid were found. In the following years further excavation in the Post Quarry, in the Cooper Canyon Formation (Dockum Group), unearthed many remains of late Triassic terrestrial fauna.

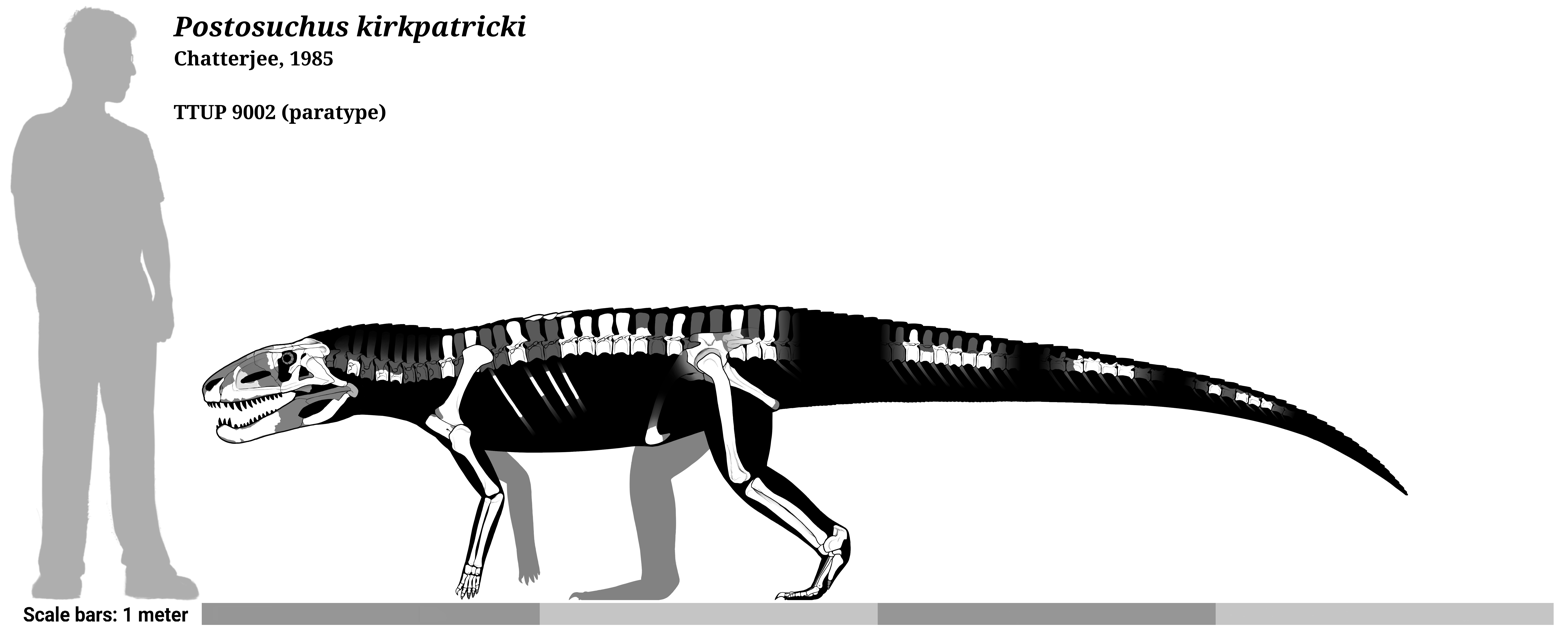
Size comparison and preserved elements of the paratype specimen (TTUP 9002)

The holotype of P. kirkpatricki (TTUP 9000), representing a well-preserved skull and a partial postcranial skeleton, was described along with other findings of this new genus by paleontologist Sankar Chatterjee in 1985. A paratype, TTU-P 9002, representing a well-preserved skull and a relatively complete skeleton was also assigned to this species. Chatterjee named the species after Mr. and Mrs. Jack Kirkpatrick who helped during his fieldwork. Subsequently, some specimens (such manus and toe bones) were re-assigned to Chatterjeea and Lythrosuchus; Long and Murry pointed out that many of the juvenile skeletons (TTUP 9003-9011), which Chatterjee assigned to P. kirkpatricki, belong to a distinct genus, which they named Chatterjeea elegans. Furthermore, in 2006 Nesbitt and Norell argued that Chatterjeea is a junior synonym of Shuvosaurus.

=== Postosuchus alisonae ===
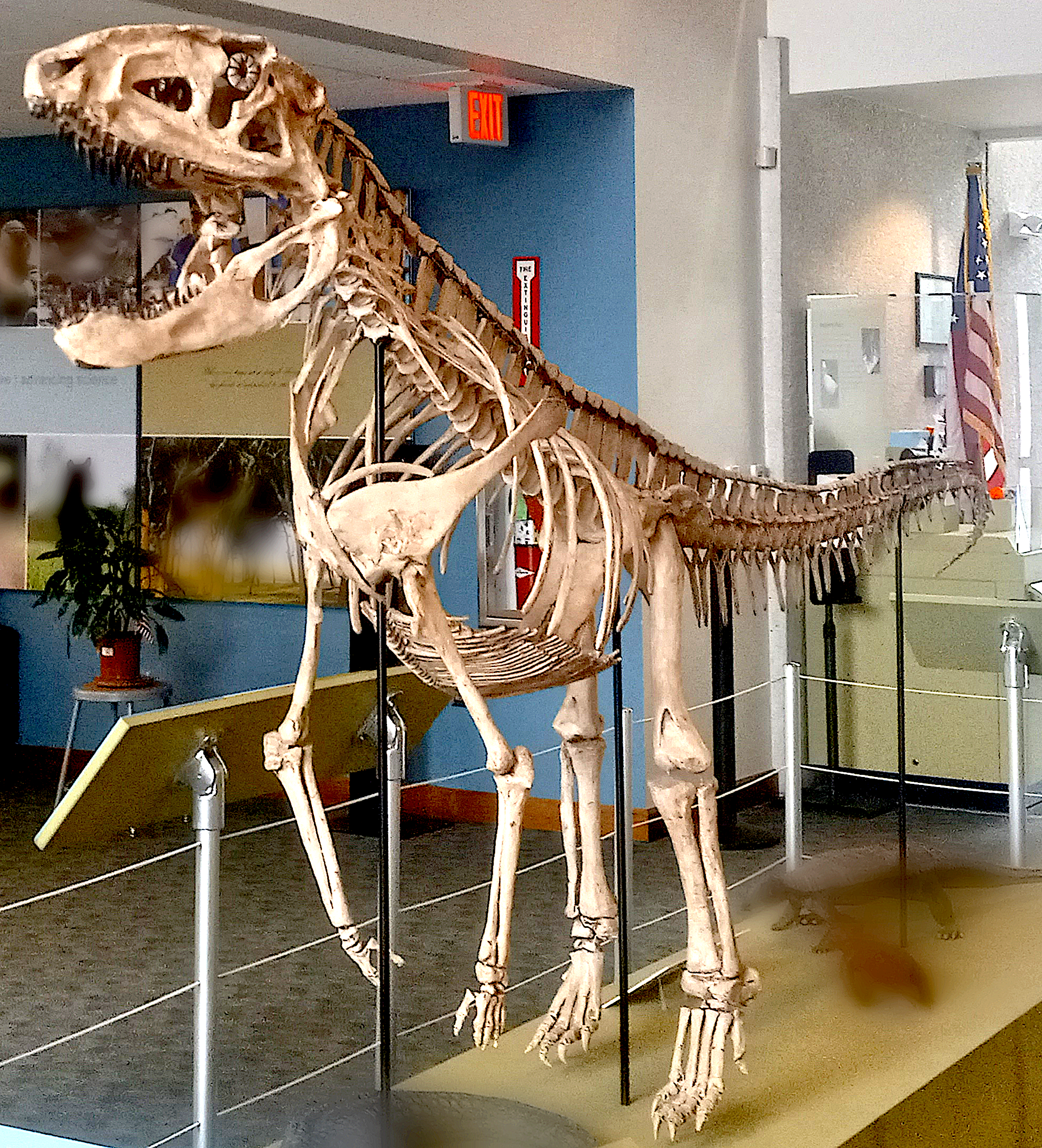
Reconstructed skeleton of Postosuchus alisonae

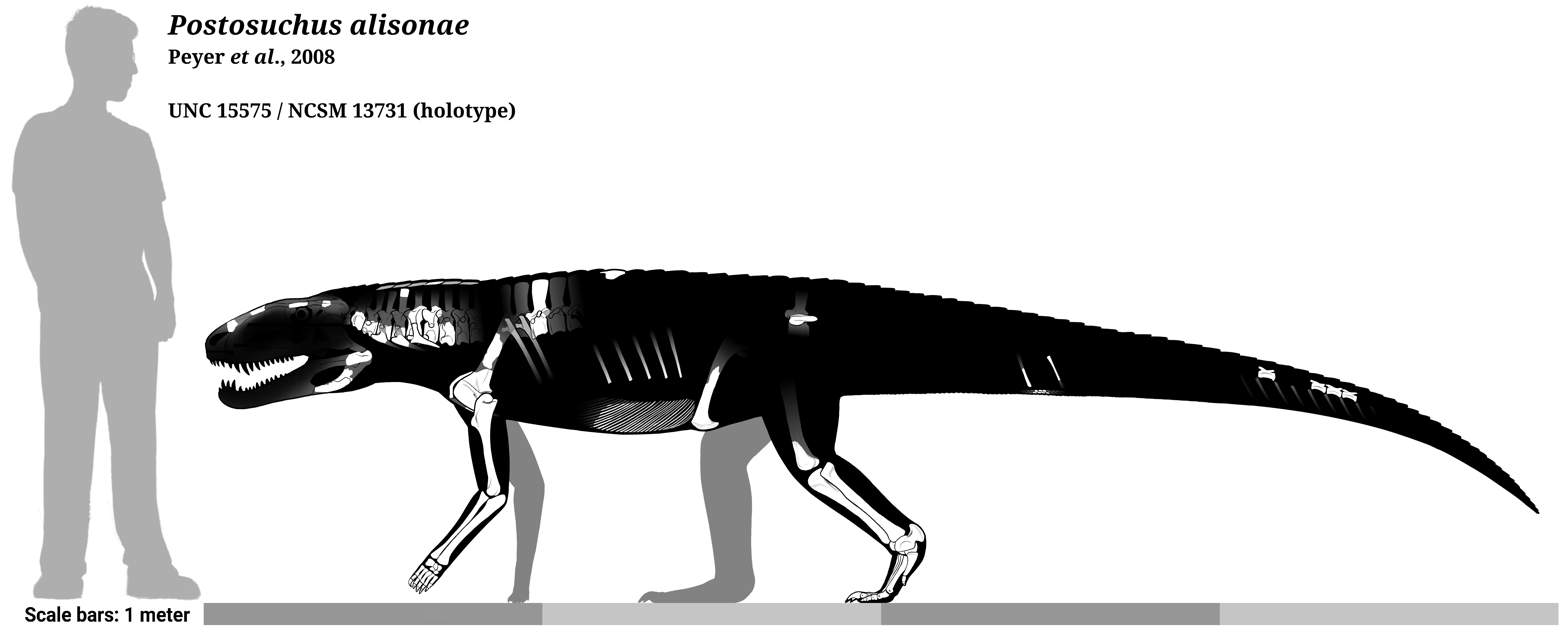
Size comparison and preserved elements of P. alisonae

In 2008, Peyer and colleagues described a new species of Postosuchus, P. alisonae. This new species was discovered in 1992 by two UNC undergrad students, Brian Coffey and Marco Brewer, at Triangle Brick Co. Quarry, in Durham County, North Carolina. The remains were prepared and reconstructed between 1994 and 1998 by the Department of Geological Sciences at the University of North Carolina. The specific name is in reference to Alison L. Chambers, who worked to popularize paleontology in North Carolina. The skeleton of P. alisonae consists of a few cranial bones, seven neck, one back, and four tail vertebrae, ribs, gastralia ("belly ribs"), chevrons, bony scutes, much of the shoulder girdles, most of the forelimbs except the left wrist and hand, most of the hindlimbs except for the thigh bones, and pieces from the hip. Moreover, the well-preserved remains of P. alisonae shed new light on parts of Postosuchus anatomy, which were previously not well known. Specifically, the differences between the manus bones of P. kirkpatricki and P. alisonae confirm the chimera theory (associated fossils belonging to different animals) suggested by Long and Murry. The holotype specimen of P. alisonae (UNC 15575) is also unusual in its preservation of gut contents: bones from at least four other animals, including a partial skeleton of an aetosaur, a snout, coracoid, and humerus of the traversodontid cynodont Plinthogomphodon, two phalanges from a dicynodont, and a possible temnospondyl bone. Furthermore, the Postosuchus was positioned on top of a skeleton of the sphenosuchian Dromicosuchus, which included tooth marks on the skull and neck. P. alisonae represents the largest suchian reptile recovered from the quarry and the first articulated specimen of 'rauisuchian' archosaur found in eastern North America.

=== Putative occurrences ===
Specimens similar to Postosuchus were discovered in Crosby County, Texas, in 1920, and described by paleontologist Ermine Cowles Case in 1922. The fossils were composed only of an isolated braincase (UM 7473) and fragments of pelvic bones (UM 7244). Case then mistakenly assigned these specimens to the dinosaur genus Coelophysis. In the case of the braincase later assigned to Postosuchus, in 2002, paleontologist David J. Gower argued that the specimen is not complete and may belong to an ornithodire. Between 1932 and 1934, Case discovered other fossils of caudal vertebrae (UMMP 13670) in Rotten Hill, Texas, and a complete pelvis (UCMP V72183/113314) near Kalgary, Texas. Within the same period, paleontologist Charles Lewis Camp collected over a hundred "rauisuchian" bones, from what is now the Petrified Forest National Park of Arizona, which belong to at least seven individuals (UCMP A296, MNA 207C). Later, more remains came to light. In 1943, Case again described a pelvis along with a pubis (UM 23127) from the Dockum Group of Texas, which dates from the Carnian through the early Norian stages of Late Triassic period. These early findings, from 1932 to 1943, were initially referred to as a new phytosaur reptile, but assigned 40 years later to Postosuchus.

The first articulated skeleton referred to P. kirkpatricki (CM 73372) was recovered by David S. Berman of the Carnegie Museum of Natural History, in the Coelophysis Quarry at Ghost Ranch, New Mexico, between 1988 and 1989. This specimen comprises a well-preserved skeleton without a skull. It was described by Long and Murry in 1995, Weinbaum in 2002 and Novak in 2004. The specimen represents a skeletally immature individual because none of the neural sutures are closed. It was referred to P. kirkpatricki by Long and Murry (1995) without specific justification, and more recent studies accepted this referral. Nevertheless, Nesbitt (2011) noted that these studies failed to note any synapomorphies unique to P. kirkpatricki and CM 73372. Weinbaum (2002) and Novak (2004) even noted that the preacetabular process of the ilium in CM 73372 was much longer than that of P. kirkpatricki. Nesbitt (2011) also noted that CM 73372 differs from P. kirkpatricki and Rauisuchus in possessing a concave ventral margin of the ilium, and from P. alisonae in processing an asymmetrical distal end of the fourth metatarsal. Nesbitt (2011) couldn't differentiate CM 73372 and Polonosuchus as they overlap only in the caudal vertebrae. A phylogenetic analysis conducted by Nesbitt (2011), one of the most extensive on archosaurs, found CM 73372 to be the most basal crocodylomorph, thus referable neither to P. kirkpatricki nor to Rauisuchidae.

In their description of Vivaron, Lessner et al. (2016) questioned the historical standard of referring all rauisuchid material from the southwestern US to Postosuchus. They argue that the discovery of a second valid rauisuchid from the area (Vivaron) stresses the need for a reappraisal of all material from localities younger or older than unequivocal remains of Postosuchus and Vivaron.

At least one valid Postosuchus specimen is known from the Chinle Formation at Petrified Forest National Park. This fossil, PEFO 55550, is a collection of fragmentary skull material from the Lot's Wide Bed in the Sonsela Member. Despite its fragmentary nature, it shows diagnostic Postosuchus traits such as a prominent ridge on the maxilla. The 2026 study which described this specimen mentioned other recently-collected rauisuchid fossils from Petrified Forest National Park, including a nearly-complete skull, though further study is required to evaluate whether they belong to Postosuchus or another genus.

== Paleoecology ==
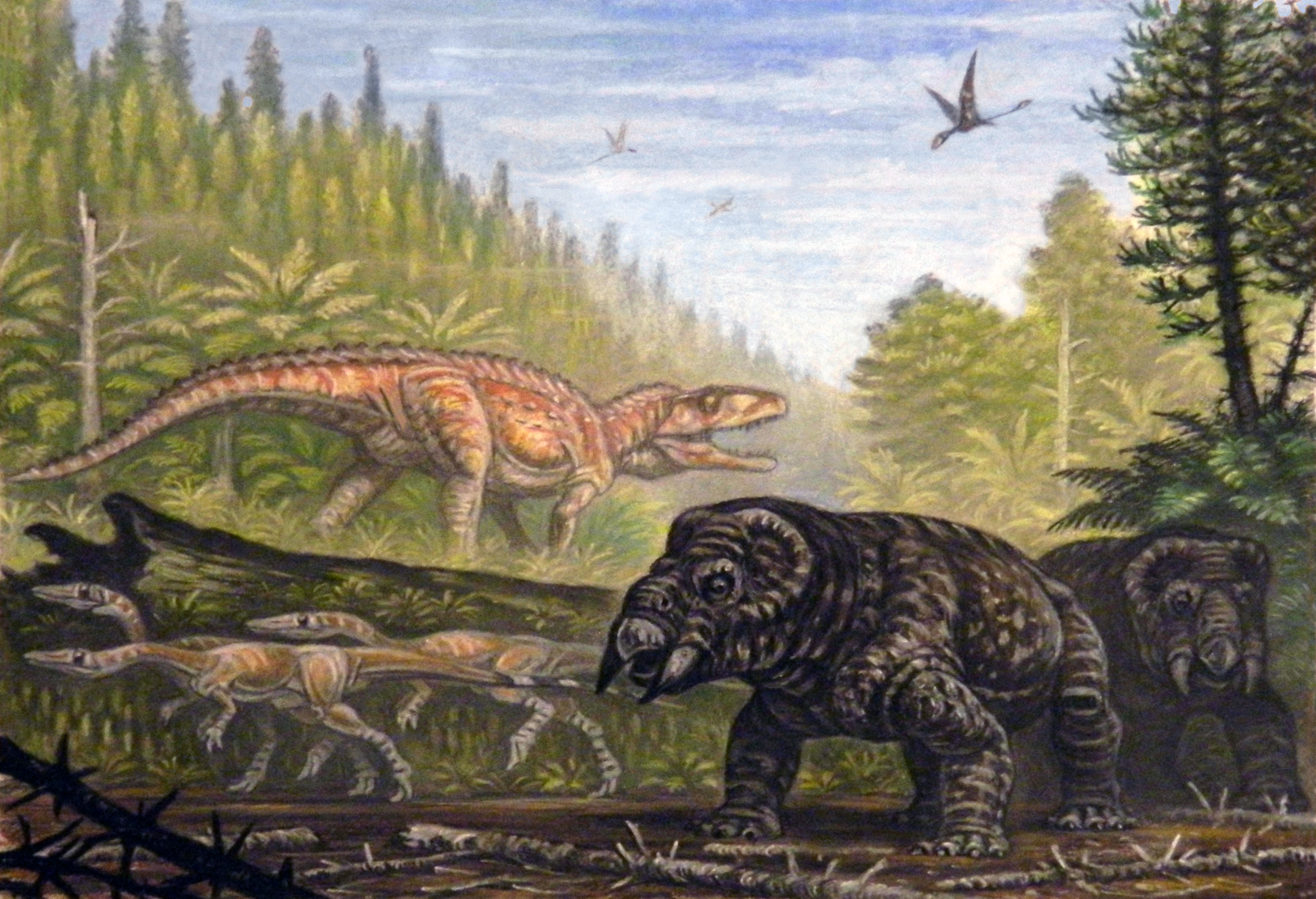
Postosuchus (background) along with contemporary faunae

Postosuchus lived in a tropical environment. The moist and warm region consisted of ferns, such as Cynepteris, Phelopteris, and Clathropteris, gymnosperms represented by Pelourdea, Araucarioxylon, Woodworthia, Otozamites, and Dinophyton, and cycads such as Sanmiguelia. Plants of the Dockum group are not well known since the oxidizing of the environment has destroyed most of the plant fossils. Some of them, however, may provide information about the climate in Dockum group during the late Triassic period. For example, the discovery of large specimens belonging to Araucarioxylon determine that the region was well watered.

Postosuchus was one of the largest animals in that ecosystem and preyed on herbivores in the uplands, such as the dicynodont Placerias. The fauna found in Dockum group confirm that lakes and/or rivers existed containing fish such as the cartilaginous Xenacanthus, the lobe-finned Chinlea, and the dipnoan Ceratodus. On the margins of these rivers and in the uplands lived labyrinthodonts (Latiscopus) and reptiles such as Malerisaurus and Trilophosaurus, and even the archosaurs Coelophysis, Desmatosuchus, Typothorax, Leptosuchus, Nicrosaurus and Rutiodon.
