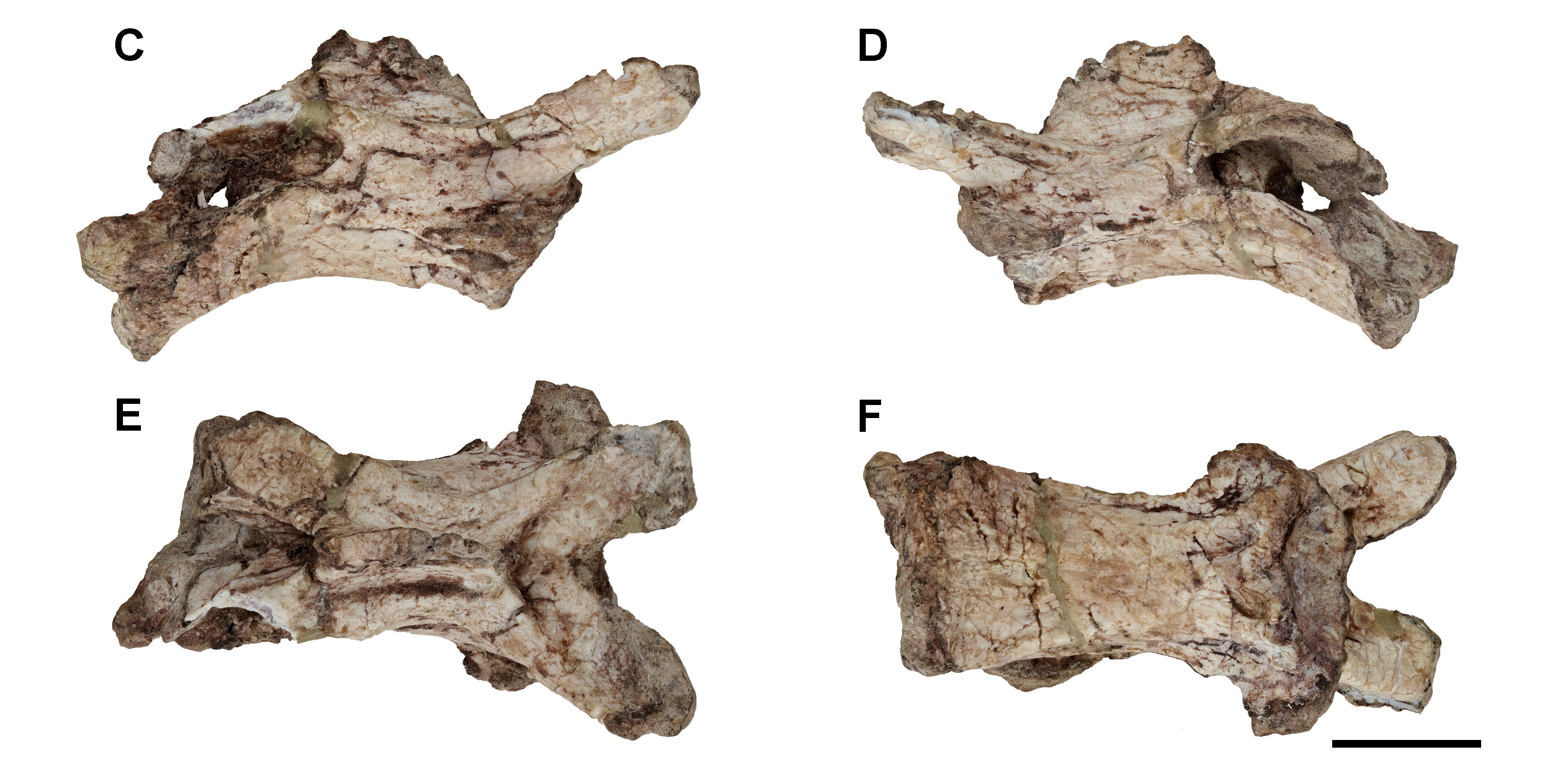
- Holotype specimen

Scientific classification
- Kingdom: Animalia
- Phylum: Chordata
- Class: Reptilia
- Clade: Archosauromorpha
- Genus: †Manistropheus; Ezcurra, Sues & Fröbisch, 2025
- Species: †M. kulicki

Binomial name
- †Manistropheus kulicki Ezcurra, Sues & Fröbisch, 2025

= Manistropheus =

Manistropheus Temporal range: Permian (late Wuchiapingian), 255.9–254.1 Ma

Genus of archosauromorphs

Manistropheus (meaning "moon vertebra") is an extinct genus of archosauromorph reptiles known from the late Permian (Wuchiapingian age) Werra Formation of Germany. The genus contains a single species, Manistropheus kulicki, known from a single neck vertebra. It is among the oldest known archosauromorphs.

== Discovery and naming ==
The Manistropheus holotype specimen, SMNK-PAL 76022, was discovered in a limestone quarry representing outcrops of the Werra Formation (Zechstein Group) near Korbach in Hesse, Germany. The specimen consists of an isolated cervical (neck) vertebra, probably the fourth in the series.

In 2025, Martín Ezcurra, Hans-Dieter Sues & Jörg Fröbisch described Manistropheus kulicki as a new genus and species of early-diverging archosauromorphs based on these fossil remains. The generic name, Manistropheus, combines a reference to Máni, an Old Norse word for the personification of the Moon in Germanic mythology, with the Greek stropheus, meaning 'vertebra'. This references the lunate (crescent) shape of a fossa (depression) on the holotype vertebra that distinguishes it from related taxa. The specific name, kulicki, Jens Kulick, who studied the geology and fossils of the type locality.

Manistropheus is one of the few archosauromorphs named from the Permian, as this clade diversified in the following Triassic period. The only other definitive Permian archosauromorphs are Aenigmastropheus, Archosaurus, Eorasaurus, and Protorosaurus.

== Classification ==
In their phylogenetic analysis, Ezcurra, Sues & Fröbisch (2025) recovered Manistropheus as the most basal member of the Archosauromorpha, diverging before the clade comprising the slightly older Aenigmastropheus and Protorosaurus. These results are displayed in the cladogram below:

- Sauria
  - Lepidosauromorpha
  - Archosauromorpha
    - Manistropheus
    - - - Aenigmastropheus
        - Protorosaurus
      - - Jesairosaurus + Tanysauria
        - Crocopoda
          - Prolacertoides
          - Elessaurus
          - - Allokotosauria
            - - Rhynchosauria
              - - Prolacertidae
                - - Teyujagua
                  - - Tasmaniosaurus
                    - Archosauriformes
