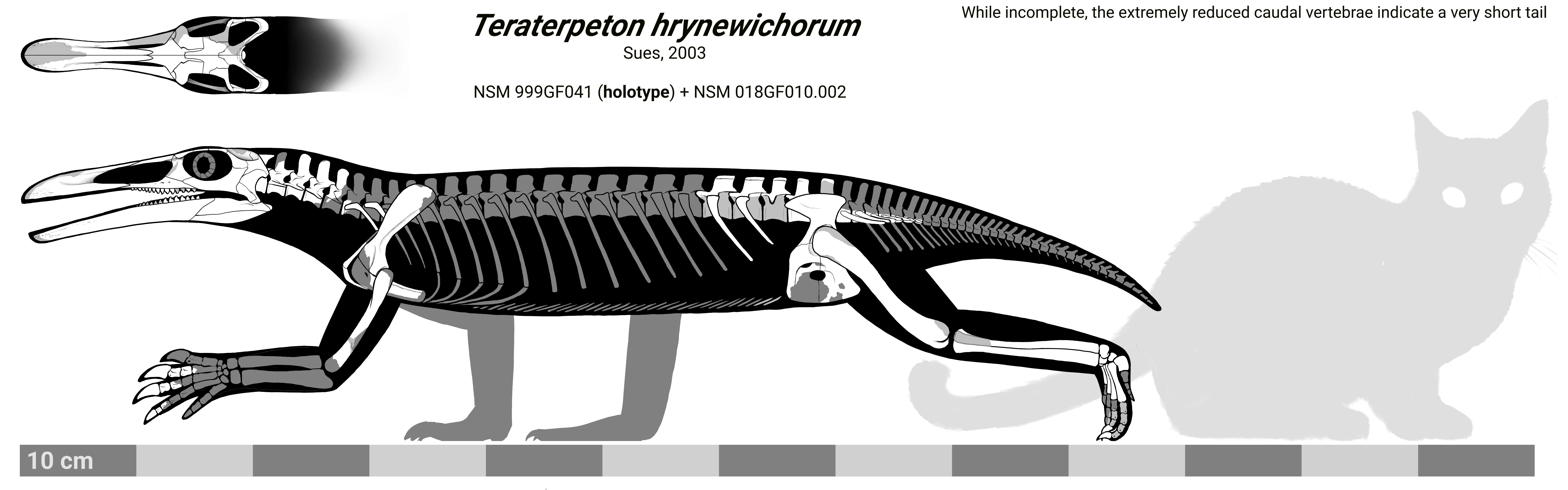
- Skeletal reconstruction

Scientific classification
- Kingdom: Animalia
- Phylum: Chordata
- Class: Reptilia
- Clade: †Allokotosauria
- Order: †Trilophosauria
- Family: †Trilophosauridae
- Genus: †Teraterpeton; Sues, 2003

Type species
- †Teraterpeton hrynewichorum Sues, 2003

= Teraterpeton =

Teraterpeton Temporal range: Late Triassic, 237–228 Ma

Extinct genus of reptiles

Teraterpeton (meaning "wonderful creeping thing" in Greek) is an extinct genus of trilophosaurid archosauromorphs. It is known from a partial skeleton from the Late Triassic Wolfville Formation of Nova Scotia, described in 2003. It has many unique features seen in no other related form, including an elongated, toothless snout and large openings for the nostrils. Because of this, Teraterpeton was originally placed in its own family, Teraterpetidae, related to Trilophosaurus. Newer studies generally place it within Trilophosauridae.

== Description ==
=== Skull ===
Teraterpeton had an unusual appearance compared to other early archosauromorphs. Members of the genus had a long skull with no teeth at the ends of the upper and lower jaws. Over each eye socket is a bony projection formed by the lacrimal and prefrontal bones. At the back of the jaws are a set of small, sharp, closely spaced teeth. They continue below the level of the eye, an unusual trait among early archosauromorphs. The upper tooth row does not run along the edge of the jaw, but is inset closer to mouth. An additional tooth row on the palate runs alongside the maxillary tooth row of the upper jaw. The teeth of the upper jaws fit closely, or occlude, with the teeth of the lower jaw. The upper jaw teeth have sharp cusps with indentations in front of them, while the lower jaw teeth have cusps with indentations behind them. The cusps of the upper teeth fit into the indentations of the lower teeth, while the cusps of the lower teeth fit into the indentations of the upper teeth.

Teraterpeton has an uncommon feature compared to most archosauromorphs: a euryapsid-type skull. Euryapsids have a single hole at the back of the skull called the supratemporal fenestra, which is located toward the top of the head. Teraterpeton evolved from diapsid reptiles with two holes at the back of their skull, the supratemporal fenestra and an infratemporal fenestra below it. Although it lacks an infratemporal fenestra, Teraterpeton still belongs to Diapsida because it is a descendant of true diapsids. Most other euryapsids such as the marine plesiosaurs and ichthyosaurs are not closely related to Teraterpeton. However, the euryapsid archosauromorph Trilophosaurus has been identified as a close relative.

Another unusual feature of Teraterpeton is the large size of its narial fenestra, a hole in the skull that serves as the opening for the nostril. This hole is positioned directly in front of the eyes and extends to the level of the toothless portion of the snout. It is positioned where the antorbital fenestra would normally be. In fact, Hans-Dieter Sues, the original describer of Teraterpeton, first considered the hole to be an antorbital fenestra before revising his hypothesis. The narial fenestra of Teraterpeton is approximately 1.5 times longer than the eye socket.

=== Postcranial skeleton ===
A string of eight cervical (neck) vertebrae are preserved in the holotype. They have large neural spines, and the second to fourth vertebrae have additional blade-like structures directly behind the neural spines. Overall, the neck is similar to that of the early rhynchosaur Mesosuchus. The cervical ribs are completely fused to the large rib facets of the vertebrae. Isolated dorsal (back), sacral (hip), and caudal (tail) vertebrae are also preserved. Caudal vertebrae from a referred specimen had very long transverse processes (column-like rib facets), and the preserved centra are extremely reduced in size, suggesting a very short tail like those of rhynchosaurs. The scapula (shoulder blade) is long and narrow. The unguals (claws) of both the hands and feet are deep and blade-like, a morphology described as "trenchant".

The preacetabular process (i.e. the front blade of the ilium bone of the hip) was large, thin and had a convex upper edge. This is in contrast to the small, bump-like preacetabular process of Trilophosaurus, and more similar to that of advanced rhynchosaurs like Hyperodapedon. The pubis and ischium bones of the hip were vertically oriented and separated by a tall, rectangular gap likely homologous with the thyroid fenestra of lepidosauromorphs and tanystropheids, rather than the lack of separation present in other early archosauromorphs. Also like tanystropheids, the fifth metatarsal of the foot was thick, short, and straight.

The simple femur and compact hip supports the interpretation that Teraterpeton had a sprawling gait. However, the modified and expanded ilium suggests that Teraterpeton's hindlimb musculature (as well as that of rhynchosaurs) was well-adapted for protracting and retracting during more erect forms of locomotion. Some paleontologists have argued that expanded leg musculature in rhynchosaurs was an adaptation for scratch-digging rather than an upright posture. While this may apply to thick-legged rhynchosaurs, digging was less likely for Teraterpeton, which had rather slender hindlimbs by comparison.

== Ecology ==
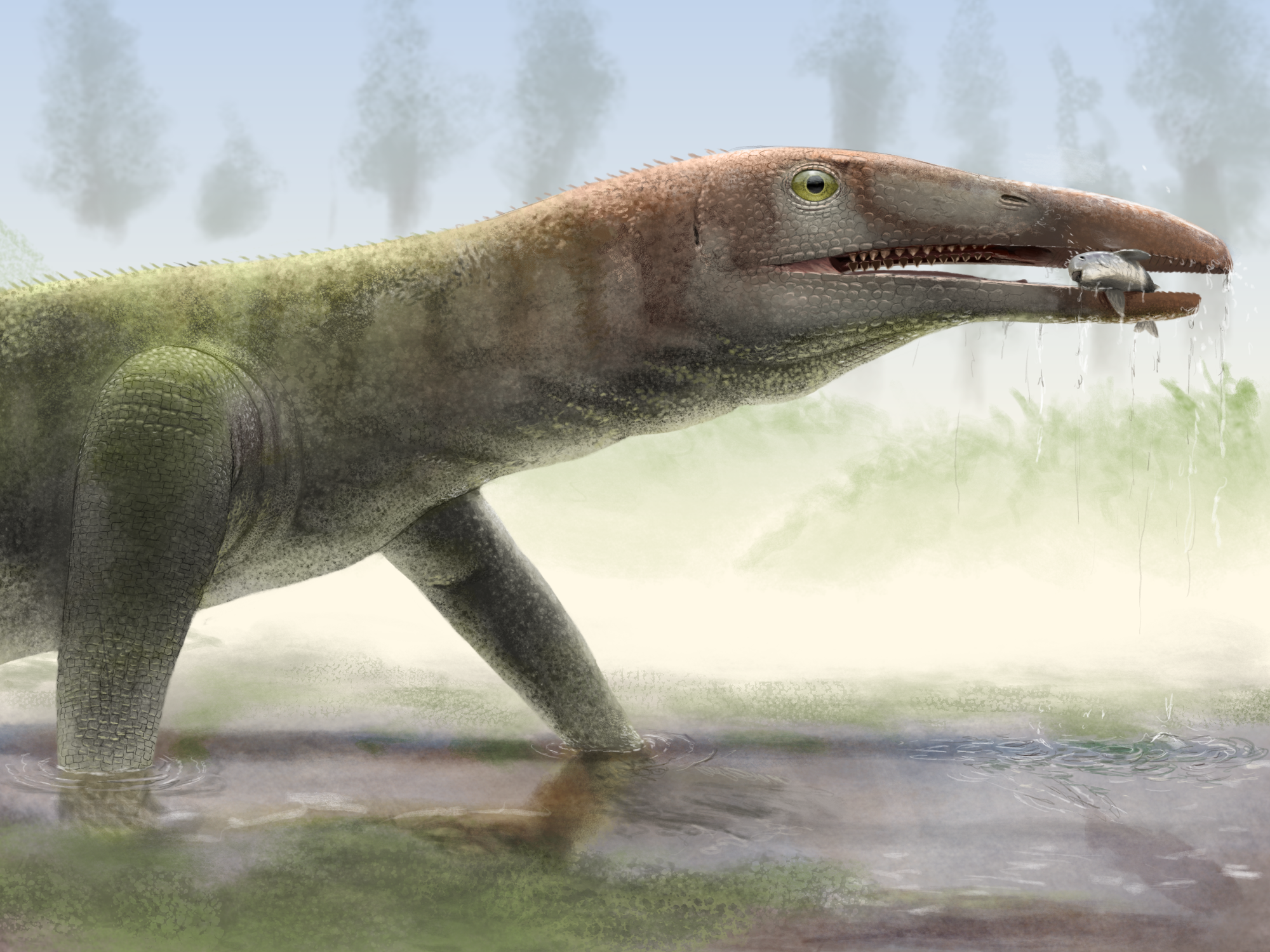
Speculative restoration of Teraterpeton feeding on fish

Trilophosaurids like Tetraterpeton have been suggested to be herbivorous or omnivorous.

== Research history ==
Teraterpeton is primarily known from a single partial holotype skeleton referred to as NSM 999GF041. This skeleton was found in a sea cliff in Burntcoat Head, Nova Scotia. The deposit from which it was found is part of the late Carnian Wolfville Formation, comprising a section of the larger Newark Supergroup that stretches across Canada and the eastern United States. The formation is located in the Fundy Basin, a rift basin which, like other Newark basins, opened as Pangaea began to break apart at the end of the Triassic. The Wolfville Formation contains a diverse assemblage of Triassic tetrapods that includes temnospondyl amphibians, procolophonid reptiles, and traversodont cynodonts. Based on the presence of the temnospondyl Koskinonodon (a common Triassic index fossil), the assemblage is dated to the Carnian stage of the Late Triassic.

The type species of Teraterpeton, T. hrynewichorum, was named in 2003. It is named after George P. Hrynewich and his son Sandy Hrynewich, fossil collectors who discovered the bones at Burntcoat Head in 1999.

Postcranial remains from a referred specimen, NSM 018GF010.002, as well as an isolated cervical vertebra (NSM 018GF010.001) were described by Pritchard & Sues in 2019.

== Classification ==
A phylogenetic analysis was provided in the original description of Teraterpeton in 2003. It placed Trilophosaurus as the closest relative of the genus. Together, these two forms comprise an archosauromorph clade that is more derived than protorosaurians and more basal than rhynchosaurs. Below is a cladogram modified from the 2003 analysis:

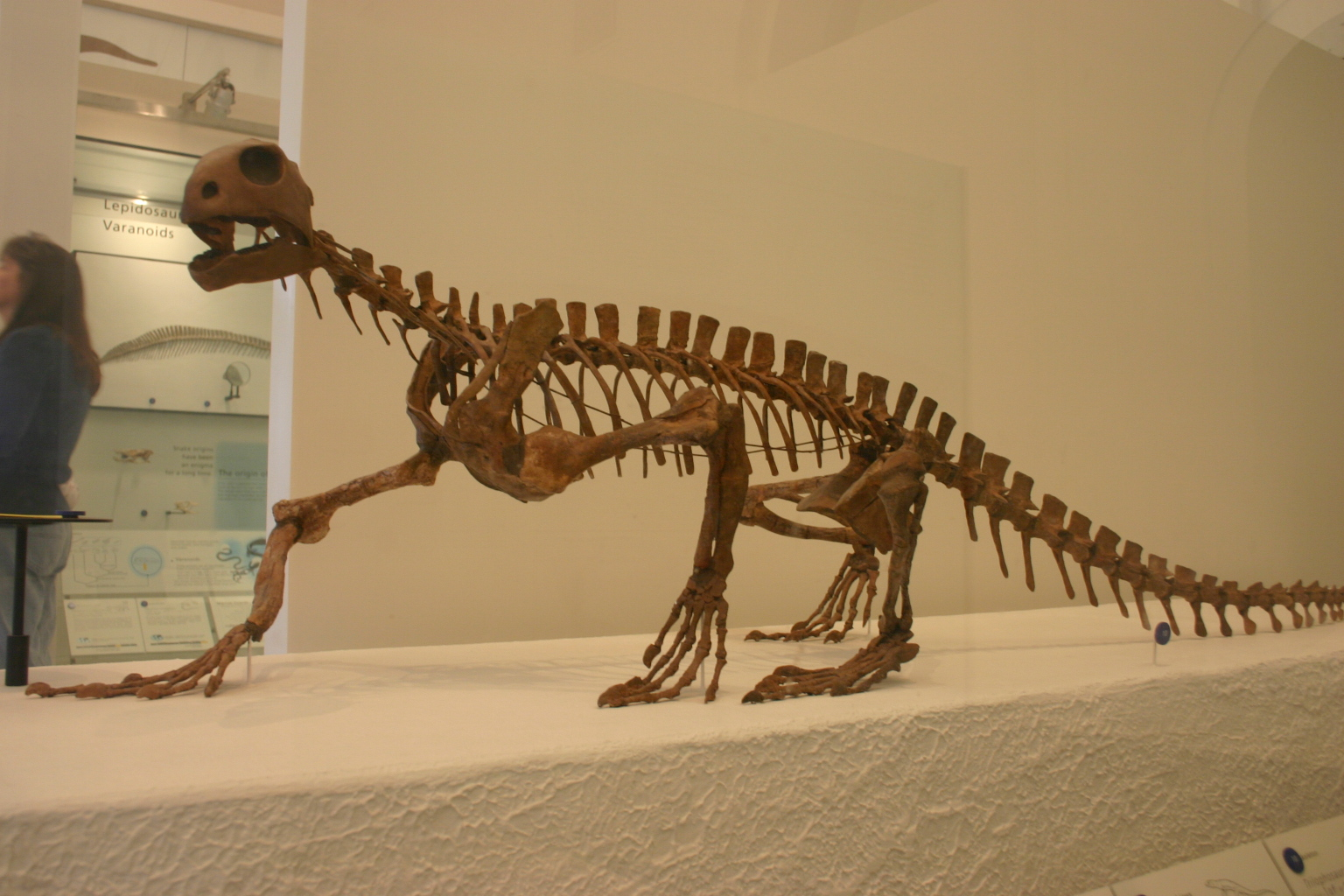
Skeleton of related Trilophosaurus

- Diapsida
  - Petrolacosaurus
  - Youngina
  - Sauria
    - Lepidosauromorpha
    - Archosauromorpha
      - Choristodera
      - - Protorosauria
        - - - Teraterpeton
            - Trilophosaurus
          - - Rhynchosauria
            - - Prolacerta
              - Archosauriformes

Cladogram after Ezcurra 2016:

- Archosauromorpha
  - Protorosaurus speneri
  - - Tanystropheidae
    - - Rhynchosauria
      - Crocopoda
        - Allokotosauria
          - Pamelaria dolichotrachela
          - - Trilophosauridae
              - Teraterpeton hrynewichorum
              - - Trilophosaurus buettneri
                - Spinosuchus caseanus (= "Trilophosaurus" jacobsi)
            - Azendohsauridae
              - Azendohsaurus laaroussii
              - Azendohsaurus madagaskarensis
        - - Prolacerta broomi
          - Archosauriformes

Cladogram of Allokotosauria after Buffa et al. (2024).

- Allokotosauria
  - Azendohsauridae
    - Malerisaurus robinsonae
    - - Azendohsaurus madagaskarensis
      - Pamelaria dolichotrachela
  - - Trilophosauridae
      - Teraterpeton hrynewichorum
      - - Spinosuchus caseanus
        - Trilophosaurus buettneri
    - Drepanosauromorpha
      - Avicranium renestoi
      - Hypuronector limnaios
      - - Vallesaurus cenensis
        - - Dolabrosaurus aquatilis
          - - Drepanosaurus unguicaudatus
            - Megalancosaurus preonensis
