= Tricuspisaurus =

Tricuspisaurus Temporal range: Late Triassic, 205.6–201.6 Ma

Scientific classification
- Domain: Eukaryota
- Kingdom: Animalia
- Phylum: Chordata
- Class: Reptilia
- Clade: Archosauromorpha
- Clade: †Allokotosauria
- Order: †Trilophosauria
- Family: †Trilophosauridae
- Genus: †Tricuspisaurus; Robinson, 1957

Type species
- †Tricuspisaurus thomasi Robinson, 1957

Extinct genus of reptiles

Tricuspisaurus is an extinct genus of reptile originally described as a trilophosaurid; it was later considered likely to be a procolophonid, but recent analyses have affirmed the original classification. Fossils are known from the Ruthin Quarry in Glamorgan, Wales, one of several Late Triassic to Early Jurassic British fissure deposits. Like some trilophosaurs, it has an edentulous, or toothless beak. Tricuspisaurus gets its name from its heterodont dentition, which includes tricuspid teeth, or teeth with three cusps. The type species, T. thomasi, was named in 1957 along with the possible trilophosaur Variodens inopinatus from Somerset, England.

Although originally classified as a trilophosaur, Tricuspisaurus was reclassified as a procolophonid in 1993 by paleontologists Hans-Dieter Sues and Paul E. Olsen. This was due to similarities between its tricuspid teeth and those of the newly described procolophonid Xenodiphyodon. Along with Tricuspisaurus, Variodens and Trilophosaurus jacobsi were also considered to be procolophonids. More recently described cranial material from T. jacobsi indicates that it is still likely to be a trilophosaur.
