= Rutiotomodon =

Rutiotomodon Temporal range: Middle Triassic, Anisian–Ladinian

Scientific classification
- Kingdom: Animalia
- Phylum: Chordata
- Class: Reptilia
- Clade: †Allokotosauria
- Order: †Trilophosauria
- Family: †Trilophosauridae
- Genus: †Rutiotomodon; Sues & Schoch, 2023
- Species: †R. tytthos

Binomial name
- †Rutiotomodon tytthos Sues & Schoch, 2023

Genus of trilophosaurid allokotosaur

Rutiotomodon is an extinct genus of trilophosaurid allokotosaur from the Middle Triassic of Germany.

== Discovery ==
Rutiotomodon was found in the Erfurt Formation. It is known from two jaw fragments: a right maxilla and a referred partial dentary that bears similarities to that of Trilophosaurus buettneri. It was described during 2023 by Hans-Dieter Sues and Rainer R. Schoch.

== Etymology ==
The genus Rutiotomodon is derived from the Greek 'rhytis', which mean 'wrinkle' or 'fold', 'tomō' which means 'to cut', and 'odon', which means tooth. This means that it means wrinkled cut tooth, in reference to the ridges on the teeth in both the maxilla and dentary. The type species of Rutiotomodon is R. tytthos. 'Tytthos' is the Greek for small (a reference to its diminutive size of 50cm long) thus making the name for this species (Rutiotomodon tytthos) mean 'small wrinkled cut tooth.

== Classification ==
In an analysis that was part of the species being named, Rutiotomodon was found to be more derived than Teraterpeton, in an unresolved polytomy with Coelodontognathus, which was recovered as a trilophosaurid.

== Paleobiology ==
Sues has suggested that Rutiotomodon may have had a small beak whilst the jaws had tightly packed teeth with broad crowns for crushing plant matter.
