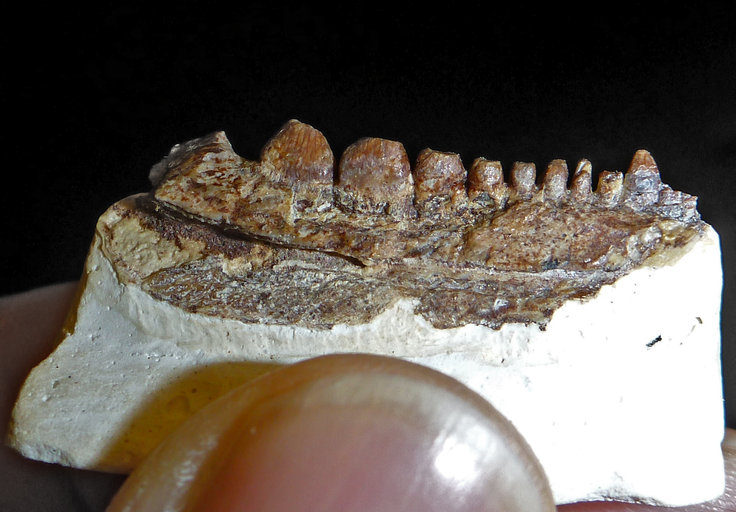
- Holotype jaw

Scientific classification
- Domain: Eukaryota
- Kingdom: Animalia
- Phylum: Chordata
- Class: Reptilia
- Clade: Archosauromorpha
- Clade: †Allokotosauria
- Order: †Trilophosauria
- Family: †Trilophosauridae (?)
- Genus: †Anisodontosaurus; Welles, 1947
- Species: †A. greeri

Binomial name
- †Anisodontosaurus greeri Welles, 1947

= Anisodontosaurus =

Anisodontosaurus Temporal range: Middle Triassic, 247.2–242.0 Ma

Extinct genus of reptiles

Anisodontosaurus is an extinct genus of trilophosaurid allokotosaur known from the Middle Triassic Moenkopi Formation of Arizona. The type species, A. greeri, was named and described by Samuel Paul Welles in 1947.

== Discovery and naming ==
The holotype, a jaw catalogued as UCMP V3922, was discovered in 1940 and was described seven years later.

Apart from the type specimen, Anisodontosaurus is known from the referred specimen UCMP 37815, a right ilium.

== Classification ==
Its taxonomic placement was largely unknown (it was placed within the Eosuchia by Welles in 1947) until the holotype was reassessed in 1998, when it was recovered as a lepidosauromorph or a trilophosaurid.

A 2023 redescription of available fossils supported its identification as a trilophosaurid, specifically as the sister taxon to Variodens, from the Late Triassic of the United Kingdom. The clade containing Anisodontosaurus and Variodens is the longest-lasting subset of Trilophosauridae, as Anisodontosaurus is one of the oldest known members of the family while Variodens is among the youngest.
