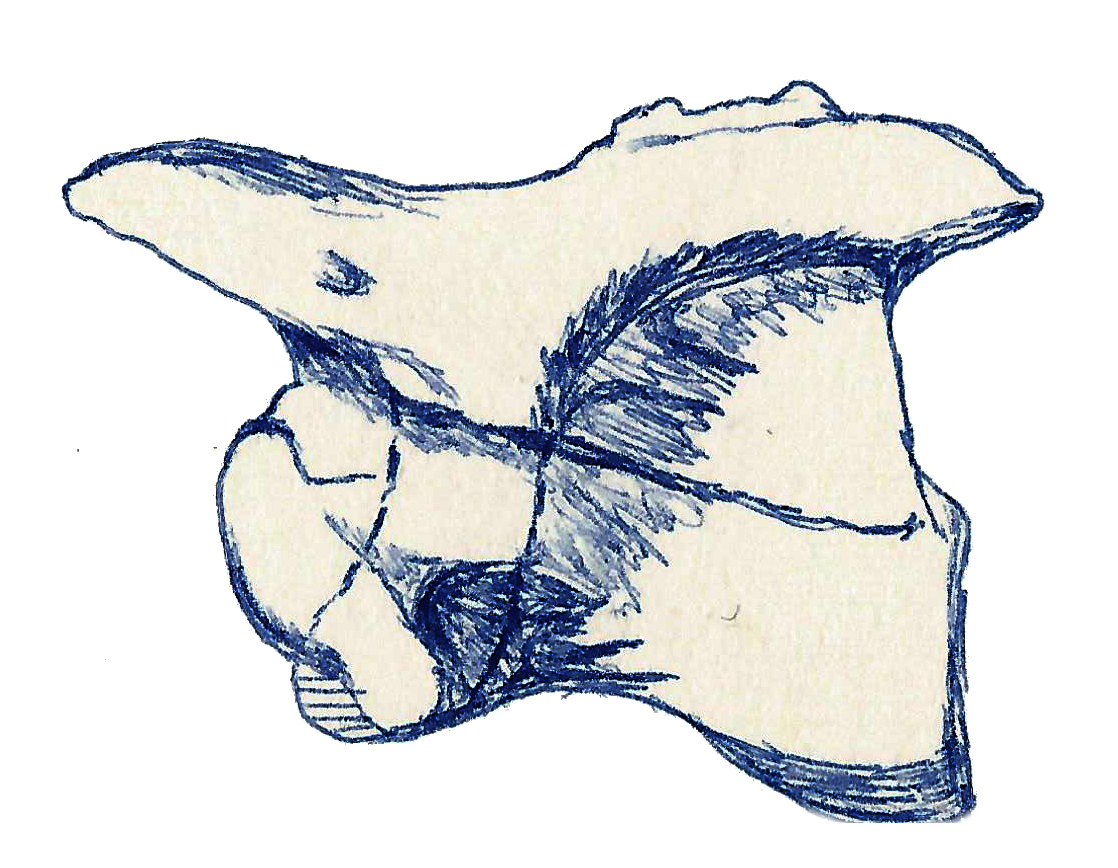
- Sketch of the holotype

Scientific classification
- Kingdom: Animalia
- Phylum: Chordata
- Class: Reptilia
- Clade: Crocopoda
- Clade: †Allokotosauria
- Genus: †Arctosaurus; Adams, 1875

Type species
- †Arctosaurus osborni Adams, 1875

= Arctosaurus =

Arctosaurus Temporal range: Late Triassic, Carnian

Extinct genus of reptiles

Arctosaurus is an extinct genus of archosauromorph, possibly an allokotosaurian, but was often classified as a sauropodomorph dinosaur between 1900 and 1976. Although it has also been classified as a theropod, recent review finds that the similarities it shares with theropods are spread throughout several groups of Late Triassic reptiles, and so it cannot be assigned any more specifically than to Archosauriformes. Other authors have suggested trilophosaurian affinities. Based on the size of the vertebra, a size of about 1.5 metres (4.9 ft) in length is extrapolated.

== Discovery and naming ==
It is based on holotype NMING: F14878, a neck vertebra that was found in 1859 by Captain Sherard Osborn on Cameron Island, Nunavut, Canada, in Late Triassic-age rocks of the Heiberg Formation. In 2016, the material of Arctosaurus osborni was redescribed. The name Arctosaurus means "arctic lizard" in reference to the latitude where the holotype was discovered.
