= Variodens =

Variodens Temporal range: Late Triassic, 247–242 Ma

Scientific classification
- Kingdom: Animalia
- Phylum: Chordata
- Class: Reptilia
- Clade: †Allokotosauria
- Order: †Trilophosauria
- Family: †Trilophosauridae
- Genus: †Variodens; Robinson, 1957

Type species
- †Variodens inopinatus Robinson, 1957

Extinct genus of reptiles

Variodens is an extinct genus of trilophosaur. Fossils have been found from the Emborough Quarries in the Mendip Hills of Somerset, England. These fossils have been uncovered from a Late Triassic fissure fill within Carboniferous-age limestone. The type and only known species is V. inopinatus, named in 1957.

== Description ==
Variodens is unusual among most reptiles in that it has a heterodont dentition consisting of different types of teeth. The five anteriormost teeth at the front of the jaw are simple and conical in shape. The cheek teeth toward the back of the jaw are wide and have several cusps. They are either tricuspid or multicuspid. The anterior tricuspid teeth of Variodens are narrower medially (toward the inside of the mouth) than they are laterally (toward the outside of the mouth). Variodens also has distinctive bulbous-shaped penultimate teeth. The teeth of Variodens are very similar to the postcanine teeth of the cynodont Cricodon from the Middle Triassic Manda Formation of East Africa.

Unlike other trilophosaurs, Variodens did not have an edentulous, or toothless beak. Teeth are present throughout the jaw including its tip. This characteristic is also seen in some trilophosaurs from the Dockum Group of the southwestern United States.

== Classification ==
Variodens was named in 1957 and was classified as a trilophosaur along with the genus Tricuspisaurus, also newly described. Variodens is usually considered to be closely related to Tricuspisaurus as well as Trilophosaurus jacobsi, a possible species of Trilophosaurus. Anisodontosaurus, from the Moenkopi Formation, may also be related to Variodens.

In 1993, paleontologists Hans-Dieter Sues and Paul E. Olsen classified Variodens, along with Tricuspisaurus and Trilophosaurus jacobsi, as a procolophonid. This reassignment was based on the close similarity between the tricuspid teeth of these trilophosaurs and those of the newly named procolophonid Xenodiphyodon. Sues and Olsen also proposed a new generic name for T. jacobsi, Chinleogomphius, given that it was no longer considered to be related to Trilophosaurus. However, because Variodens and Tricuspisaurus are known primarily from teeth, it is difficult to determine their classification. The similarities between the teeth of Variodens and those of procolophonids may be convergent adaptations to a herbivorous diet, and do not necessarily indicate a close relationship.

More recently, new material belonging to T. jacobsi has been found, including a nearly complete left side of the skull that clearly shows that it belongs to the genus Trilophosaurus and is not a procolophonid. Since Variodens is thought to be closely related to T. jacobsi, it too is probably a trilophosaur rather than a procolophonid.

Whiteside & Duffin (2017) agreed with Robinson's original interpretation of V. inopinatus as a trilophosaur, noting that tooth implantation of the specimen (fragment of a left dentary) described by the authors is ankylothecodont, as described for Trilophosaurus by Heckert et al. (2006).
