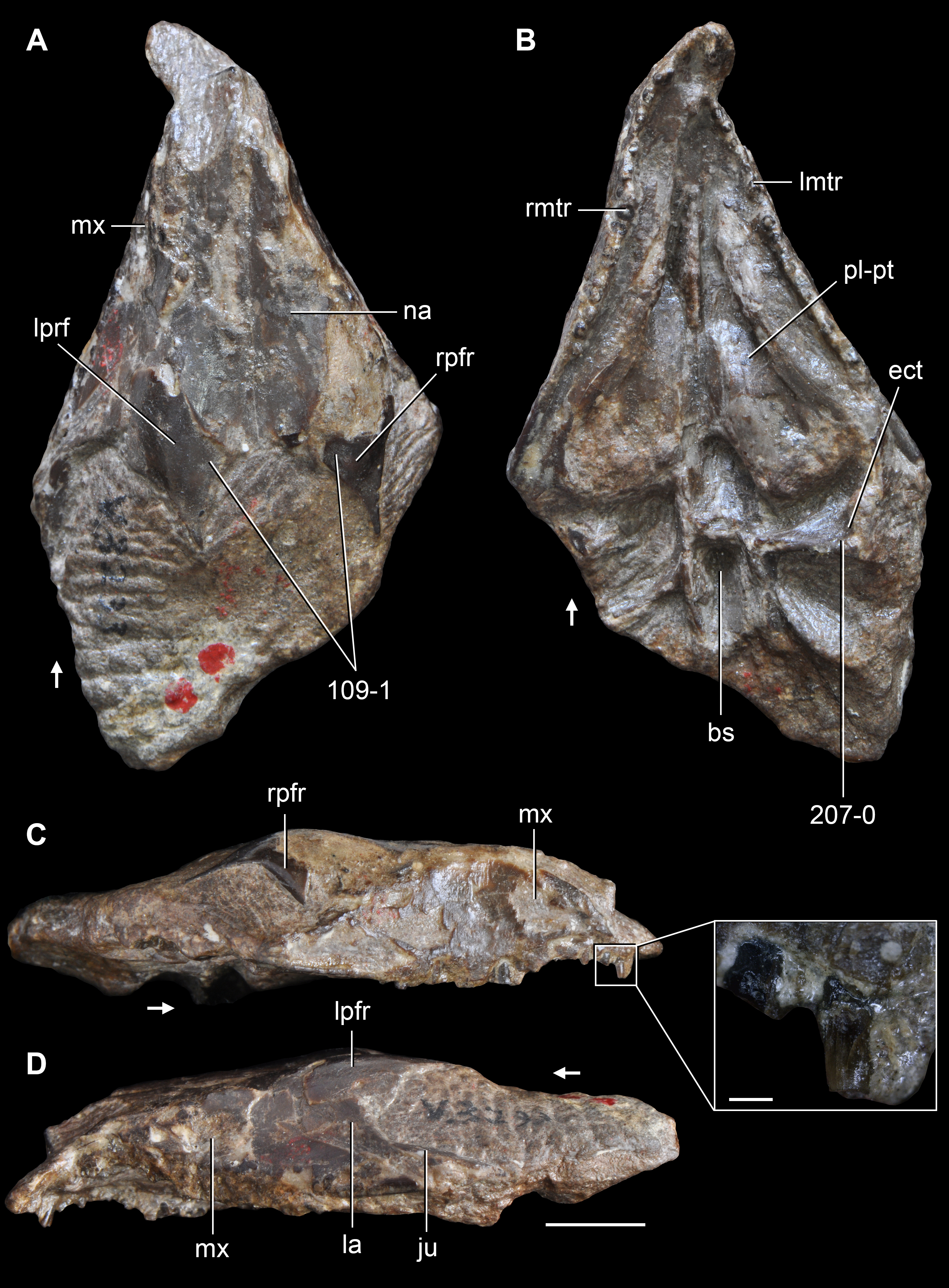
- The holotype skull of Prolacertoides

Scientific classification
- Kingdom: Animalia
- Phylum: Chordata
- Class: Reptilia
- Clade: Archosauromorpha
- Family: incertae sedis
- Genus: †Prolacertoides; Yang, 1973

Type species
- †Prolacertoides jimusarensis Yang, 1973

= Prolacertoides =

Prolacertoides Temporal range: Early Triassic, Induan

Extinct genus of reptiles

Prolacertoides is an extinct genus of archosauromorph reptile from the Early Triassic of China, the type species being Prolacertoides jimusarensis. Prolacertoides means 'like Prolacerta', in reference to Prolacerta, another genus of archosauromorph which Prolacertoides was once believed to have been closely related to. Prolacertoides is known from a single partial skull, IVPP V3233, which was discovered in Xinjiang in northwestern China. The locality of its discovery belongs to the Cangfanggou Group of the Jiucaiyuan Formation, which is dated to the Induan age of the very early Triassic.

== Description ==
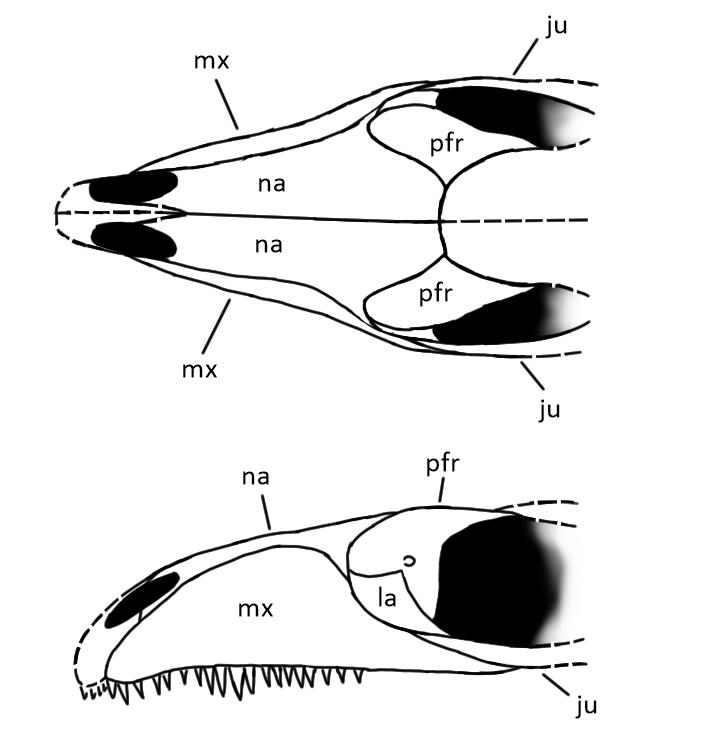
A reconstruction of the skull of Prolacertoides

IVPP V3233 is a partially flattened and incomplete skull, with some bones being well preserved and others being badly damaged. The snout is tapering and lacks antorbital fenestrae. The anterodorsal edge of each maxilla is convex, in contrast to the concave edge of other basal archosauromorphs. The ascending process of each maxilla is tall and anteroposteriorly broad, reaching the edge of the skull roof. The anterior process of each jugal is long and thin, forming the lower edge of the orbit, unlike in basal saurians. A moderate number of maxillary teeth (approximately 19) are present, but the tooth row does not reach as far back as the orbits. The teeth themselves are straight, conical, and lack serrations, with only the rear teeth being slightly compressed. The nares are long and situated on the edge of the snout. Each nasal widens towards the rear of the skull, forming an anterolaterally-oriented suture with the prefrontal. Each lacrimal is wide and slit-like while the prefrontals are well exposed, traits similar to those of Prolacerta. Each prefrontal is dorsally smooth and convex, possessing a large lateral pit as well as a triangular medial projection which restricts the nasal-frontal suture. This restriction is also found in Trilophosaurus and Gephyrosaurus. Unlike in Prolacerta and basal archosauriforms, there is extensive contact between the pterygoids. The pterygoids and palatines were seemingly toothless, although this observance may be due to poor preservation. The tip of each ectopterygoid expands into a fan-shaped structure, and the suborbital fenestra is very short.

== Classification ==
Prolacertoides was named in 1973 and classified in the family Prolacertidae. The first phylogenetic analyses to include Prolacertoides (published in 1988 and 1997) found it to be more closely related to the Late Triassic archosauromorph Trilophosaurus rather than prolacertids. Another analysis published in 1997 included Prolacertoides but its relationships with other archosauromorphs could not be resolved because few distinctive anatomical characteristics are known. The exact relationships of Prolacertoides were still considered unknown in 2007.

Prolacertoides was redescribed in a 2016 study of archosauromorph and archosauriform systematics. The study also included a set of phylogenetic analyses in an effort to clarify the classification of certain archosauromorphs. However, the large amount of missing data for Prolacertoides forced it to be excluded from most of the analyses, which focused on more complete taxa. The phylogenetic analyses which did include Prolacertoides found that it was an archosauromorph forming a polytomy with Allokotosauria, Tanystropheidae, and Jesairosaurus. In more precise analyses which exclude incomplete or problematic taxa such as Prolacertoides, this polytomy was resolved, with Allokotosauria forming a clade with more advanced archosauromorphs (such as rhynchosaurs and archosauriforms), and Tanystropheidae forming a more basal clade with Jesairosaurus. Due to its omission from these more specific analyses, it is unclear whether Prolacertoides is closer to Allokotosauria or the Tanystropheidae-Jesairosaurus clade. Nevertheless, Prolacertoides was not found in any analysis to be a particularly close relative of its namesake Prolacerta.
