= Heiberg Formation =

Geologic formation in NorthwestTerritories, Canada

- Stratigraphic range: Upper Triassic
- Type: Geological formation

The Heiberg Formation is a geological formation in Northwest Territories, Canada.

== Vertebrate fauna ==
Color key: Taxon / Reclassified taxon / Taxon falsely reported as present / Dubious taxon or junior synonym / Ichnotaxon / Ootaxon / Morphotaxon	Notes; Uncertain or tentative taxa are in small text; ~~crossed out~~ taxa are discredited.

Vertebrates reported from the Heiberg Formation
Genus	Species	Location	Stratigraphic position	Material	Notes
Arctosaurus	A. osborni				

== See also ==
- List of stratigraphic units with few dinosaur genera
