= Spinosuchus =

Spinosuchus Temporal range: Late Triassic, Carnian–Norian

Scientific classification
- Domain: Eukaryota
- Kingdom: Animalia
- Phylum: Chordata
- Class: Reptilia
- Clade: Archosauromorpha
- Clade: †Allokotosauria
- Order: †Trilophosauria
- Family: †Trilophosauridae
- Genus: †Spinosuchus von Huene, 1932

Species
- †S. caseanus von Huene, 1932 (type)

Synonyms
- ?Trilophosaurus jacobsi Murry, 1987

Extinct genus of reptiles

Spinosuchus (meaning "spined crocodile") is an extinct genus of trilophosaurid allokotosaur from the Late Triassic of Texas, southern United States. It has been assigned to a variety of groups over its history, from coelophysid dinosaur to pseudosuchian to uncertain theropod dinosaur and to Proterosuchidae. This uncertainty is not unusual, given that it was only known from a poorly preserved, wall-mounted, partial vertebral column of an animal that lived in a time of diverse, poorly known reptile groups. However, newly collected material and recent phylogenetic studies of early archosauromorphs suggest that it represents an advanced trilophosaurid very closely related to Trilophosaurus.

== History ==
In 1922, Ermine Cowles Case described a partial vertebral column (UMMP 7507) he'd discovered in 1921 from the Tecovas Member of the Carnian-age Upper Triassic Dockum Formation of Crosby County, Texas, as Coelophysis sp. (Coelophysis at that time also being poorly known). He considered it to be about 2.5 meters (8.5 ft) long. Additional material was referred to it, including a femur (UMMP 3396), an ilium (UMMP 8870), and a basicranium (UMMP 7473). These additional remains have since been recognized as belonging to a variety of other Triassic animals, all of which were poorly known or unknown at the time: the femur to an aetosaur, possibly Desmatosuchus, the ilium to a herrerasaurid, either Chindesaurus or Caseosaurus, depending on the taxonomic authority, and the basicranium to the rauisuchian Postosuchus.

Friedrich von Huene recognized it as a new genus in 1932, and named it in honor of Case. He considered it to be a "podokesaurid". Since the 1970s, though, it has been considered a nondinosaurian. However, a review by Hunt et al. in 1998 suggested that it was a theropod, possibly a herrerasaurid, citing its hollow centra as evidence for dinosaurian affinities. In an abstract for the 1999 Society of Vertebrate Paleontology meeting and his unpublished thesis, Richards recognized that it had a variety of characters that are apomorphic for various dinosaur subgroups, but that these are also found in different basal archosaur groups, and that the poorly preserved, distorted, and reconstructed vertebrae offer no evidence for assignment to any major archosaur group; it does, though, show some resemblances to the trilophosaurs. Further review, as part of a larger series of papers on the evolution of dinosaurs in the Late Triassic by Sterling Nesbitt, Randall Irmis, and William Parker, found Spinosuchus to be a valid genus. However, the authors could not classify it beyond Archosauriformes, and disagreed with Richards' trilophosaur hypothesis. Justin Spielmann and colleagues published a redescription in 2009 that concluded Spinosuchus was a trilophosaurid closely related to Trilophosaurus.

Nesbitt et al. (2015) performed a phylogenetic analysis focusing on relations within Allokotosauria and recovered Trilophosaurus jacobsi to be more closely related to S. caseanus than to the type species of Trilophosaurus, Trilophosaurus buettneri. To further test this possibility, the types of S. caseanus and T. jacobsi were scored separately from the referred Kahle Trilophosaurus Quarry elements (referred to T. jacobsi by Spielmann et al. (2008) or to S. caseanus by Spielmann et al. (2009)). A phylogenetic analysis recovered the three in a monophyletic clade to the exclusion of T. buettneri based on a single autapomorphy. Furthermore, the types of S. caseanus and T. jacobsi as well as the Kahle Quarry material all scored identically, suggesting that T. jacobsi not only should be reassigned to Spinosuchus, but in fact represents the junior synonym of its type and only species (S. caseanus). Nesbitt et al. (2015) refrained from officially synonymizing the two taxa pending further study of other advanced trilophosaurids.

== Sources ==
- Glut, D.F. (2002). Is Spinosuchus a theropod? In: Glut, D.F. Dinosaurs: The Encyclopedia. 2nd Supplement. McFarland & Company, Inc.:Jefferson, North Carolina, 46-48. ISBN 0-7864-1166-X
