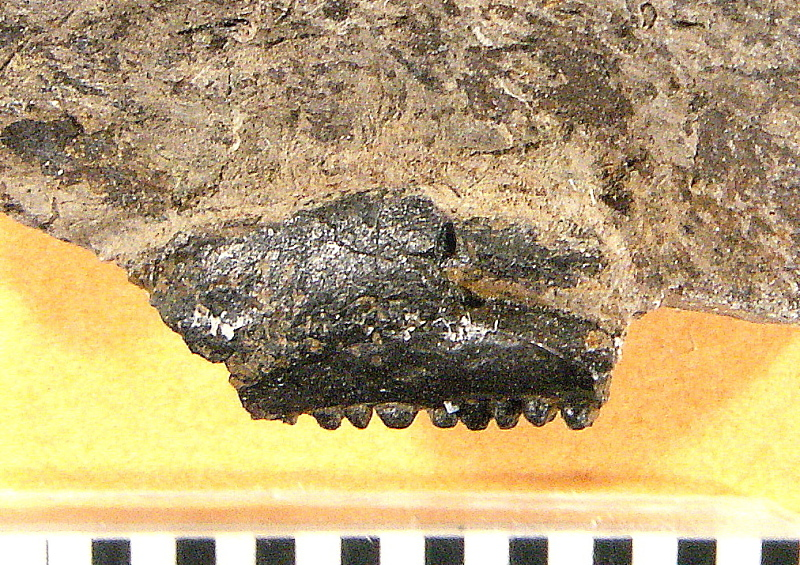
- Holotype jaw

Scientific classification
- Kingdom: Animalia
- Phylum: Chordata
- Class: Reptilia
- Clade: †Allokotosauria
- Order: †Trilophosauria
- Family: †Trilophosauridae (?)
- Genus: Xenodiphyodon
- Species: X. petraios

Binomial name
- Xenodiphyodon petraios Sues & Olsen, 1993

= Xenodiphyodon =

Xenodiphyodon Temporal range: Late Triassic

Extinct genus of tetrapods

Xenodiphyodon is an extinct genus of reptile with some similarities to trilophosaurids, known from the Late Triassic Turkey Branch Formation of Virginia, United States. The genus contains a single species, Xenodiphyodon petraios, was described by Hans-Dieter Sues and Paul E. Olsen in 1993.
