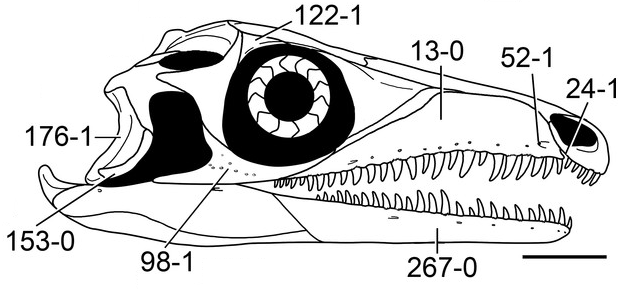
- Illustration of the skull of Prolacerta broomi

Scientific classification
- Kingdom: Animalia
- Phylum: Chordata
- Class: Reptilia
- Clade: Archosauromorpha
- Clade: Crocopoda
- Family: †Prolacertidae; Parrington, 1935

Genera
- †Kadimakara; †Prolacerta (Type)

= Prolacertidae =

Prolacertids Temporal range: Induan-Olenekian, 252–247 Ma

Extinct family of reptiles

Prolacertidae is an extinct family of archosauromorph reptiles that lived during the Early Triassic epoch. It was named in 1935 by the British palaeontologist Francis Rex Parrington to include the species Prolacerta broomi of South Africa and Antarctica. In 1979 a second species, Kadimakara australiensis, was described from Australia. Several other genera, such as Macrocnemus, Pamelaria and Prolacertoides, have also been assigned to this family in the past, but these have been placed elsewhere by later studies, leaving Prolacerta and Kadimakara as the only well-supported members.

The prolacertids were historically placed within the paraphyletic group Prolacertiformes along with other basal, long-necked archosauriforms like Protorosaurus and the tanystropheids. However, more recent research has shown that the prolacertids were only distantly related to other "prolacertiforms", and were instead among the closest relatives of Archosauriformes.

The cladogram below follows a phylogenetic analysis by Ezcurra (2016):

- Archosauromorpha
  - Aenigmastropheus
  - - Protorosaurus
    - - - Jesairosaurus
        - Tanystropheidae
      - Crocopoda
        - Allokotosauria
        - - Rhynchosauria
          - - Boreopricea
            - - Prolacertidae
                - Kadimakara
                - Prolacerta
              - - Tasmaniosaurus
                - Archosauriformes
