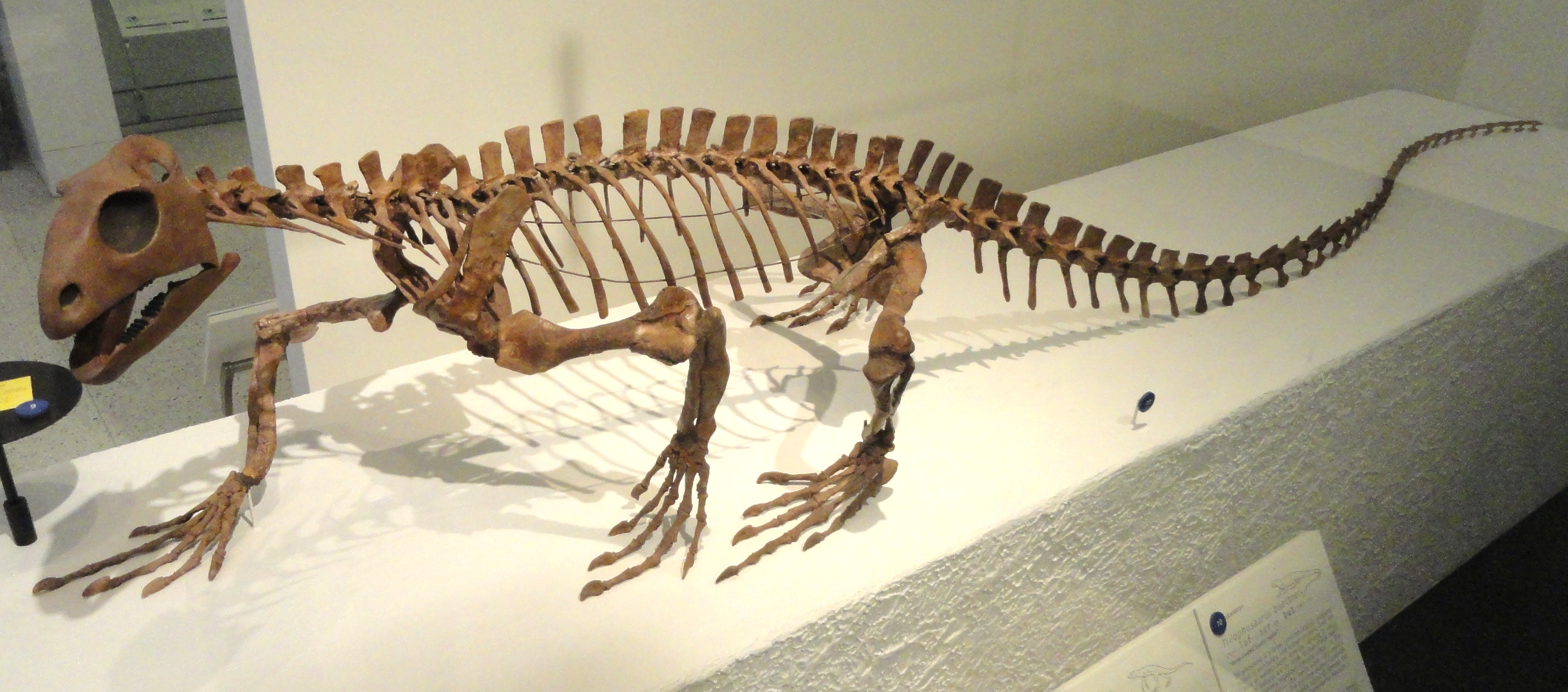
- Mounted skeleton of Trilophosaurus

Scientific classification
- Kingdom: Animalia
- Phylum: Chordata
- Class: Reptilia
- Clade: †Allokotosauria
- Order: †Trilophosauria; Romer, 1956
- Family: †Trilophosauridae; Gregory, 1945

Genera
- †Anisodontosaurus?; †Coelodontognathus?; †Doniceps?; †Rutiotomodon; †Spinosuchus; †Teraterpeton; †Tricuspisaurus; †Trilophosaurus; †Variodens; †Vitalia?

Synonyms
- Teraterpetidae Sues, 2003

= Trilophosauridae =

Trilophosauridae Temporal range: Triassic, Anisian–Rhaetian

Extinct family of reptiles

Trilophosaurs are lizard-like Triassic allokotosaur reptiles related to the archosaurs. The best known genus is Trilophosaurus, a herbivore up to 2.5 metres (8.2 feet) long. It had a short, unusually heavily built skull, equipped with massive, broad flattened cheek teeth with sharp shearing surfaces for cutting up tough plant material. Teeth are absent from the premaxilla and front of the lower jaw, which in life were probably equipped with a horny beak.

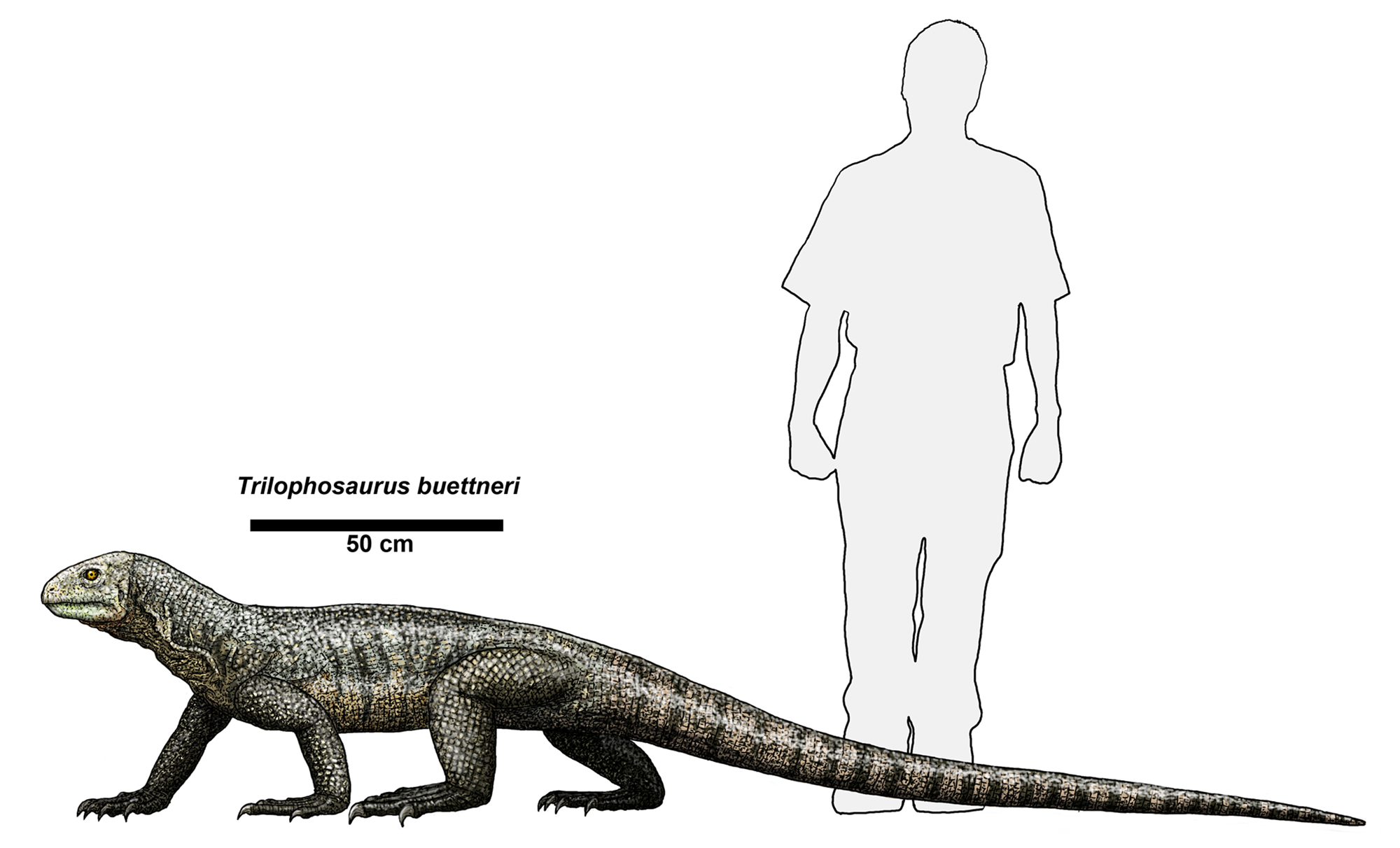
Size comparison of Trilophosaurus buettneri

The skull is also unusual in that the lower temporal opening is missing, giving the appearance of a euryapsid skull, and originally the Trilophosaurs were classified with placodonts and sauropterygia. Carroll (1988) suggests that the lower opening may have been lost to strengthen the skull.

Trilophosaurs are so far known only from the Late Triassic of North America and Europe.

Below is a cladogram showing the phylogenetic relationships of Trilophosauridae within Archosauromorpha as recovered by Nesbitt et al. (2015).

- Sauria
  - Lepidosauromorpha
  - Archosauromorpha
    - Protorosaurus speneri
    - - Tanystropheidae
        - Macrocnemus bassanii
        - - - Langobardisaurus pandolfii
            - Tanytrachelos ahynis
          - - Amotosaurus rotfeldensis
            - Tanystropheus longobardicus
      - Crocopoda sensu Ezcurra (2016)
        - Rhynchosauria
          - Mesosuchus browni
          - - Rhynchosaurus articeps
            - Teyumbaita sulcognathus
        - - - Archosauriformes
            - Prolacerta broomi
          - Allokotosauria
            - Pamelaria dolichotrachela
            - - Azendohsauridae
                - Azendohsaurus laaroussii
                - Azendohsaurus madagaskarensis
              - Trilophosauridae
                - Teraterpeton hrynewichorum
                - - Trilophosaurus buettneri
                  - Spinosuchus caseanus
                    - "Trilophosaurus" jacobsi
                    - Spinosuchus caseanus holotype

== Sources ==
- Benton, M. J. (2000), Vertebrate Paleontology, 2nd ed. Blackwell Science Ltd, p. 144
