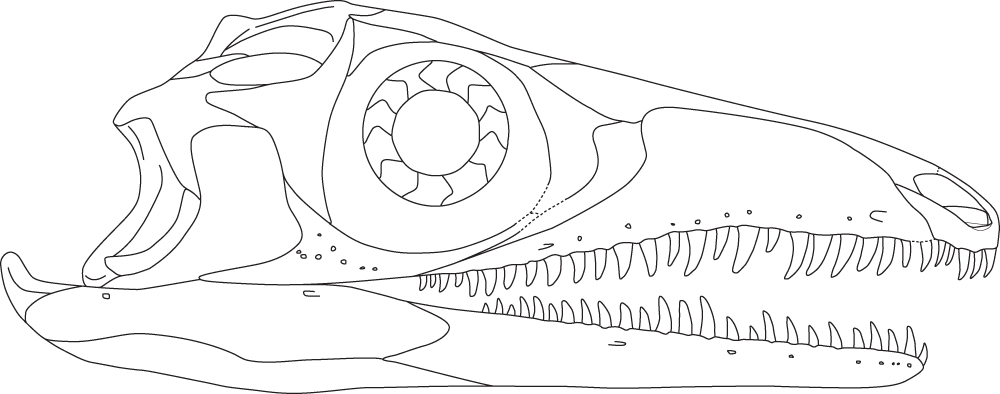
- The skull of Prolacerta broomi

Scientific classification
- Kingdom: Animalia
- Phylum: Chordata
- Class: Reptilia
- Clade: Archosauromorpha
- Clade: Crocopoda
- Family: †Prolacertidae
- Genus: †Prolacerta; Parrington, 1935
- Species: †P. broomi

Binomial name
- †Prolacerta broomi Parrington, 1935

Synonyms
- Pricea longiceps Broom & Robinson, 1948

= Prolacerta =

Prolacerta Temporal range: Early Triassic, Induan-Olenekian ~252–247 Ma

Extinct genus of reptile from the lower Triassic

Prolacerta is a genus of archosauromorph reptile from the lower Triassic of South Africa and Antarctica. The only known species is Prolacerta broomi. Prolacerta was a small and slender animal with a rather long neck, low skull, and serrated teeth. It would have resembled a modern monitor lizard at a quick glance, though this is an example of convergent evolution as opposed to close affinities.

When first discovered, Prolacerta was considered to be ancestral to modern lizards ("lacertilians"). However, a study by Gow (1975) instead found that it shared more similarities with the lineage that would lead to archosaurs such as crocodilians and dinosaurs (including birds). Prolacerta is now understood to be one of the most well-known early members of this lineage, formally known as Archosauromorpha. Some paleontologists have previously used the term "Prolacertiformes" in reference to superficially lizard-like early archosauromorphs, though the usage of Prolacertiformes as a valid group has lost support in recent decades. Many modern paleontologists consider Prolacerta to be among the closest relatives of the Archosauriformes, an advanced group of archosauromorphs including true archosaurs.

== History of discovery ==
Head portrait

=== South African fossils ===
Prolacerta was first described by Francis Rex Parrington in 1935 from a single skull discovered near the small town of Middelburg in the Eastern Cape of South Africa. The fossil was recovered from an exposure of rock from the Katberg Formation in the Lystrosaurus Assemblage Zone. This original skull, the holotype, is now stored at the Cambridge University Museum of Zoology as specimen UMZC 2003.40 (or UCMZ 2003.41R).

The generic name Prolacerta is derived from Latin, meaning "before lizard", and its species name broomi is in commemoration of the famous paleontologist Robert Broom, who discovered and studied many of the fossils found in rocks of the Karoo Supergroup.

Beyond Parrington's original skull fossil, additional skull material was slowly accumulated over the course of the mid-20th century. One skull, BPI 471, was originally described as a new genus and species, Pricea longiceps, by Broom and Robinson (1948). Later authors concluded that Pricea was a junior synonym of Prolacerta, only distinguishable by its style of preservation. As of 2018, 25 different Prolacerta specimens have been found in South Africa. One (the holotype) is accessioned at Cambridge, one at UCMP (University of California Museum of Paleontology), 7 at BPI (Bernard Price Institute for Palaeontological Research), 2 at NMQR (National Museum, Bloemfontein), 13 at SAM-PK (Iziko South African Museum), and one is yet to acquire a repository.

Gow (1975) provided the most complete description of the fossil material collected and stored at BPI up to that point, establishing Prolacerta's affinities with archosaurs rather than lizards. Evans (1986) described the braincase in more detail. Modesto and Sues (2004) redescribed the skull as a whole, focusing on the UCMP specimen alongside 5 specimens stored at BPI. The holotype skull in Cambridge was redescribed by Gabriela Sobral (2023).

=== Antarctic fossils ===
Prolacerta was first reported from Antarctica by Edwin H. Colbert in 1987. The original Antarctic fossils were collected from 1969 to 1971 by James Kitching and his colleagues, working in the Fremouw Formation near the junction of the McGregor and Shackleton glaciers. Colbert described 17 different Prolacerta specimens from Antarctica, all of which are stored at the American Museum of Natural History (AMNH). Most of the AMNH specimens are rather fragmentary, but two nearly complete skulls are included among the sample: AMNH 9520 and AMNH 9521.

The Antarctic Prolacerta fossils were amended by Stephan Spiekman (2018), with the description of a new articulated skeleton stored at the Burke Museum of Natural History and Culture (UWBM). This specimen, UWBM 95529, is both the largest and most complete Prolacerta skeleton which has been described, though only fragments of the skull are preserved. The 2018 study re-evaluated Colbert's sample, finding that 14 of the AMNH specimens are still validly referable to Prolacerta.

The AMNH fossils are distinctly smaller than the South African remains, and several anatomical differences are apparent. The AMNH fossils tend to have a shorter snout, more conical teeth, dorsal neural spines which are slanted backwards, and a proportionally shorter tibia, among other traits. Colbert preferred the hypothesis that they simply represent juvenile fossils, though he could not disprove the idea that they were from a second species which was smaller than P. broomi. Some of the differences between the AMNH and South African fossils are ambiguous due to quirks of preservation and limited overlap between specimens. UWBM 95529 is not only comparable in size to the South African fossils, but also anatomically indistinguishable from them. This supports the interpretation that the AMNH fossils are juveniles, while dissuading the idea that the Antarctic remains are from a dwarfed species.

== Description ==
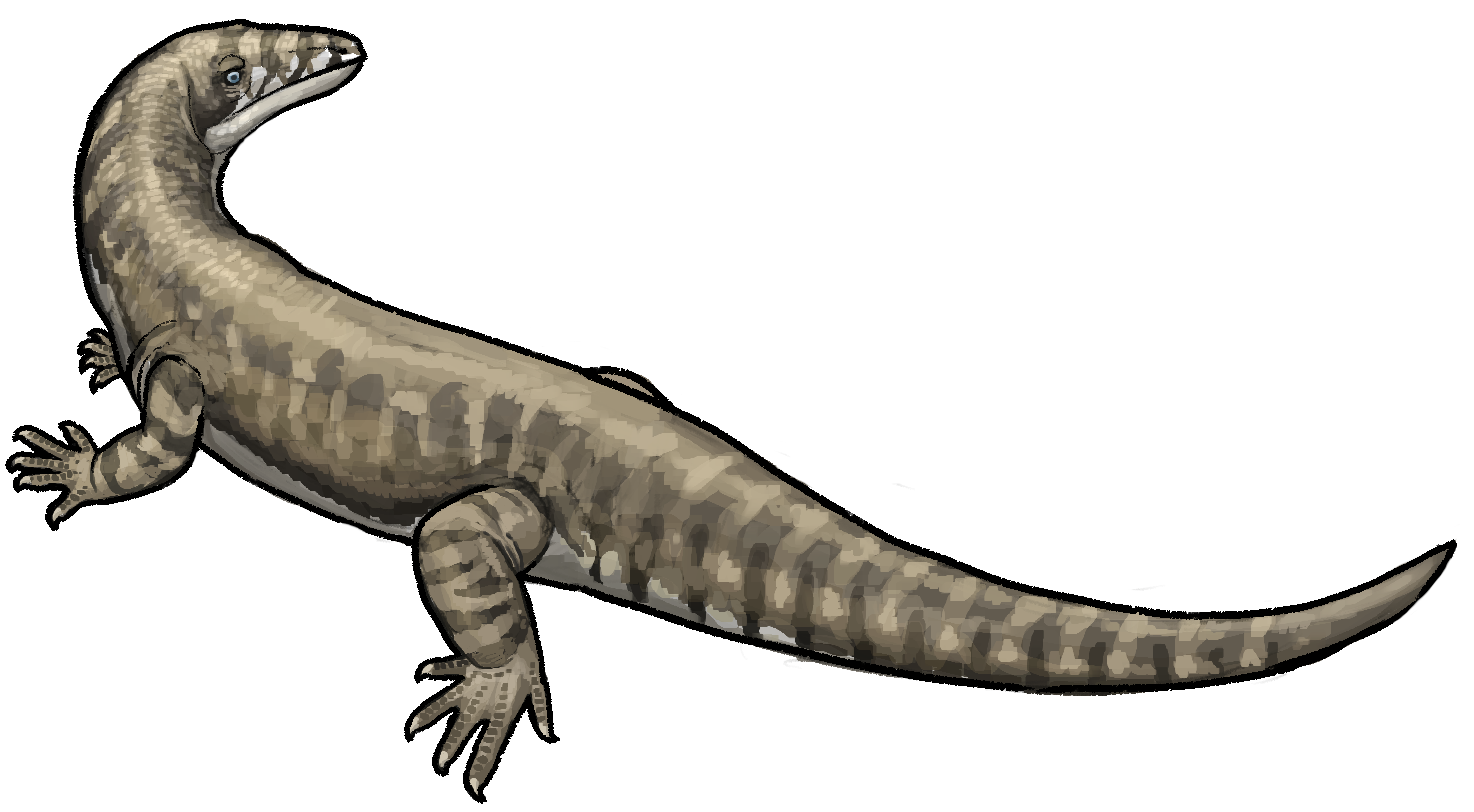
Life restoration of Prolacerta broomi

Prolacerta were small reptiles that lived during the Induan and Olenekian stages of the lower Triassic. Prolacerta is arguably the most well-represented stem-archosauriform, with numerous well preserved specimens housed in various research institutions in South Africa, Europe, and in the United States. With the skull of adult specimens ranging between 8 – 10 cm in length, Prolacerta were considered to have been small, lizard-like animals. However, several cranial and postcranial features set Prolacerta apart from lizards and instead show that it is an early relative of crown-archosaurs. Some of these notable features include elongated cervical vertebrae with elongate, thickened neural spines, which gave Prolacerta a slightly elongated neck and a wide range of flexibility. Cranial features include thecodont teeth, a feature observed in all ancestors of crown archosaurs, which were pointed and caniniform in shape.

Prolacerta was probably a small, active, terrestrial carnivore or insectivore due to its fang-like teeth of roughly the same size and shape. Prolacerta is considered to have been a quadruped, although due to its hind limbs being larger and longer than its front limbs, there is a possibility that it was habitually bipedal during high activity. It has been hypothesized that Prolacerta was capable of cranial kinesis, although research into this possible feature of Prolacerta remains inconclusive.

== Classification ==
At the time that Parrington described the first Prolacerta fossil, the early evolutionary relationships of archosaurs was even more poorly understood than they are currently. Due to its small size and lizard-like appearance, Parrington placed Prolacerta between basal younginids and modern lizards. Parrington's classification of Prolacerta was accepted for several decades, including by the paleontologist Charles Lewis Camp who conducted further research on Prolacerta. It was only after more Prolacerta fossils were found that more in depth research was undertaken on this animal. In the 1970s the close link between Prolacerta and crown archosaurs was first hypothesized, which lead to numerous phylogenetic analyses being conducted on Prolacerta and other stem archosaurs from the 1980s onwards.

Initially hypothesized to be ancestral to lizards, Prolacerta was later identified as an archosauromorph by Gow (1975). Gow placed it into a group known as the Prolacertiformes, which also contained "protorosaurs" such as Protorosaurus, Macrocnemus, and the long-necked tanystropheids. Macrocnemus and a few other "prolacertiforms" were allied with Prolacerta in the family Prolacertidae. However, later studies starting with Dilkes (1998) have split apart the concept of Prolacertiformes, with "protorosaurs" being placed near the base of Archosauromorpha, and Prolacerta being much closer to Archosauriformes. Prolacertidae was also split by this reassessment, with Macrocnemus now considered a tanystropheid. Currently, Prolacertidae is restricted to Prolacerta and its close Australian cousin Kadimakara. Prolacertids are considered to be archosauromorphs within the clade Crocopoda, along with the allokotosaurs, rhynchosaurs, and archosauriforms.

The following cladogram is based on a large analysis of archosauriforms published by M.D. Ezcurra in 2016

- Sauria
  - †Choristodera
  - Lepidosauromorpha
  - Archosauromorpha
    - - †Aenigmastropheus
      - - †Protorosaurus
        - - †Tanystropheidae
          - Crocopoda
            - †Allokotosauria
              - †Pamelaria
              - - †Azendohsaurus
                - †Trilophosaurus
            - - †Rhynchosauria
              - - †Prolacertidae
                  - †Kadimakara
                  - †Prolacerta
                - - † Tasmaniosaurus
                  - Archosauriformes
