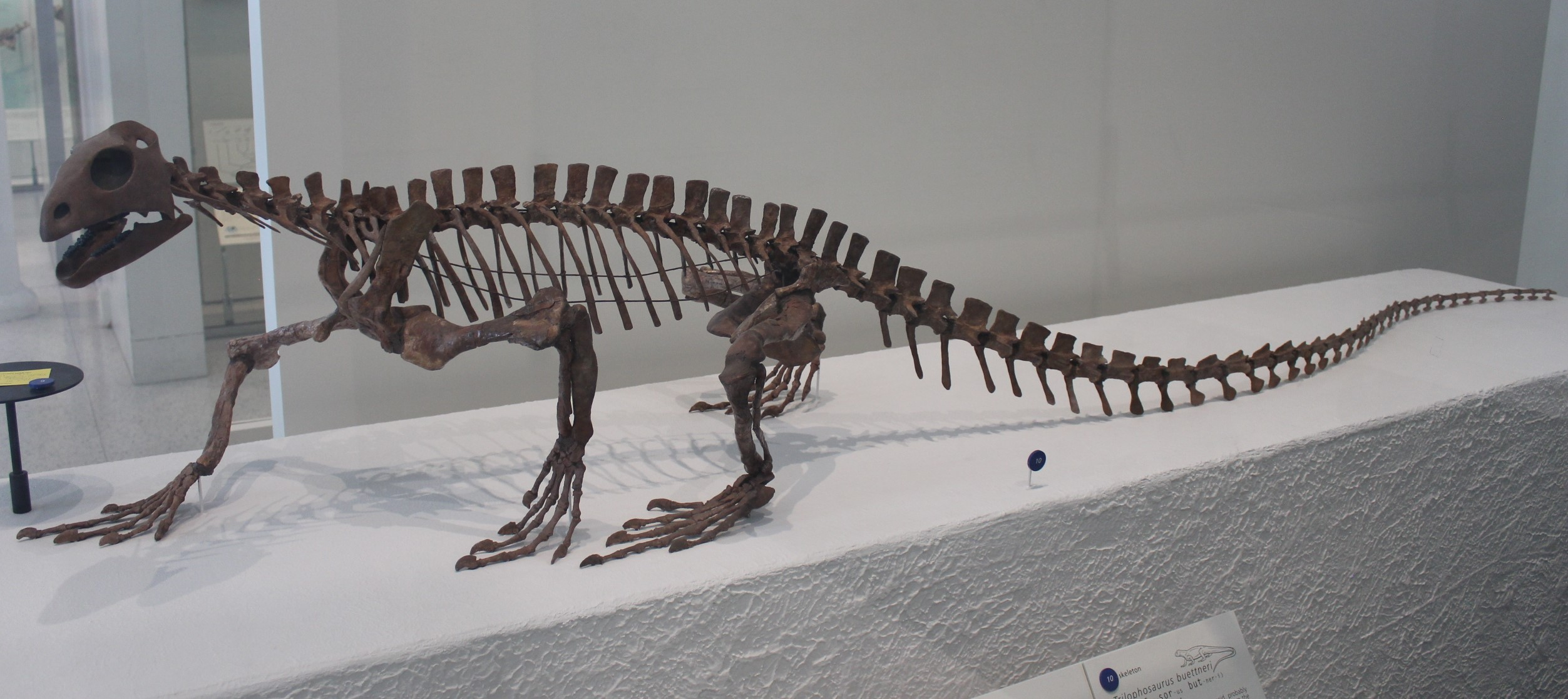
- Skeleton of Trilophosaurus buettneri (AMNH 7502)

Scientific classification
- Domain: Eukaryota
- Kingdom: Animalia
- Phylum: Chordata
- Class: Reptilia
- Clade: Archosauromorpha
- Clade: †Allokotosauria
- Order: †Trilophosauria
- Family: †Trilophosauridae
- Genus: †Trilophosaurus; Case, 1928

Type species
- †Trilophosaurus buettneri Case, 1928

Species
- †T. buettneri Case, 1928; †?T. dornorum Mueller & Parker, 2006; †?T. jacobsi Murry, 1987 (Junior synonym of Spinosuchus?); †T. phasmalophos Kligman et al., 2020

Synonyms
- Genus synonymy: Chinleogomphius Sues & Olsen, 1993; Synonyms of T. buettneri: Malerisaurus langstoni Chatterjee, 1986; Synonyms of T. jacobsi: Chinleogomphius jacobsi (Murry, 1987); ?Trilophosaurus dornorum Mueller & Parker, 2006

= Trilophosaurus =

Trilophosaurus Temporal range: Late Triassic, Carnian–Norian

Extinct genus of reptiles

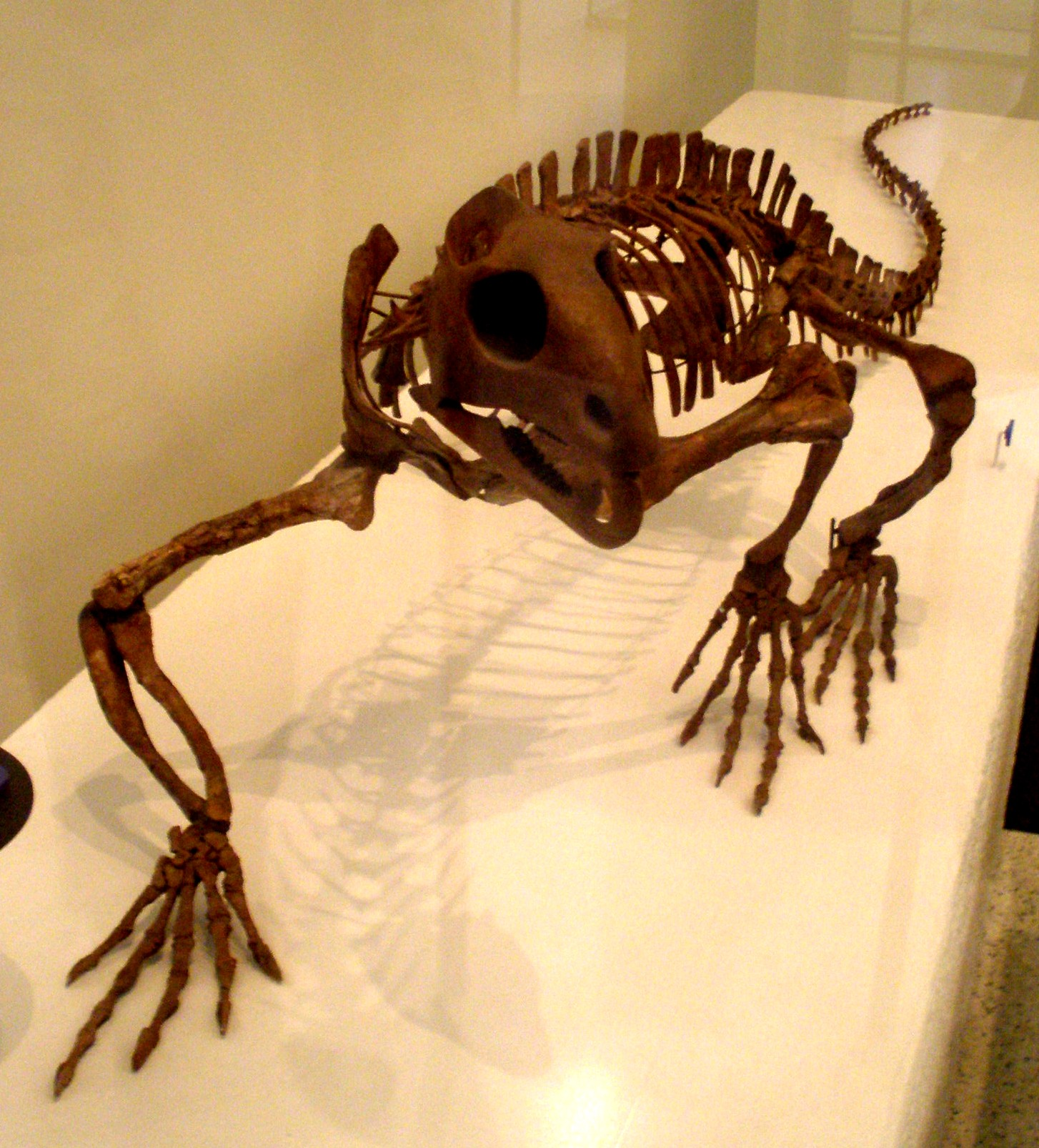
Front of T. buettneri skeleton, American Museum of Natural History

Trilophosaurus (Greek for "lizard with three ridges") is a lizard-like trilophosaurid allokotosaur known from the Late Triassic of North America. It was a herbivore up to 2.5 m long.

== Description ==
Trilophosaurus had a short, unusually heavily built skull, equipped with massive, broad flattened cheek teeth with sharp shearing surfaces for cutting up tough plant material. Teeth are absent from the premaxilla and front of the lower jaw, which in life were probably equipped with a horny beak. Based on evidence derived from tooth wear patterns, Trilophosaurus was able to masticate labiolingually.

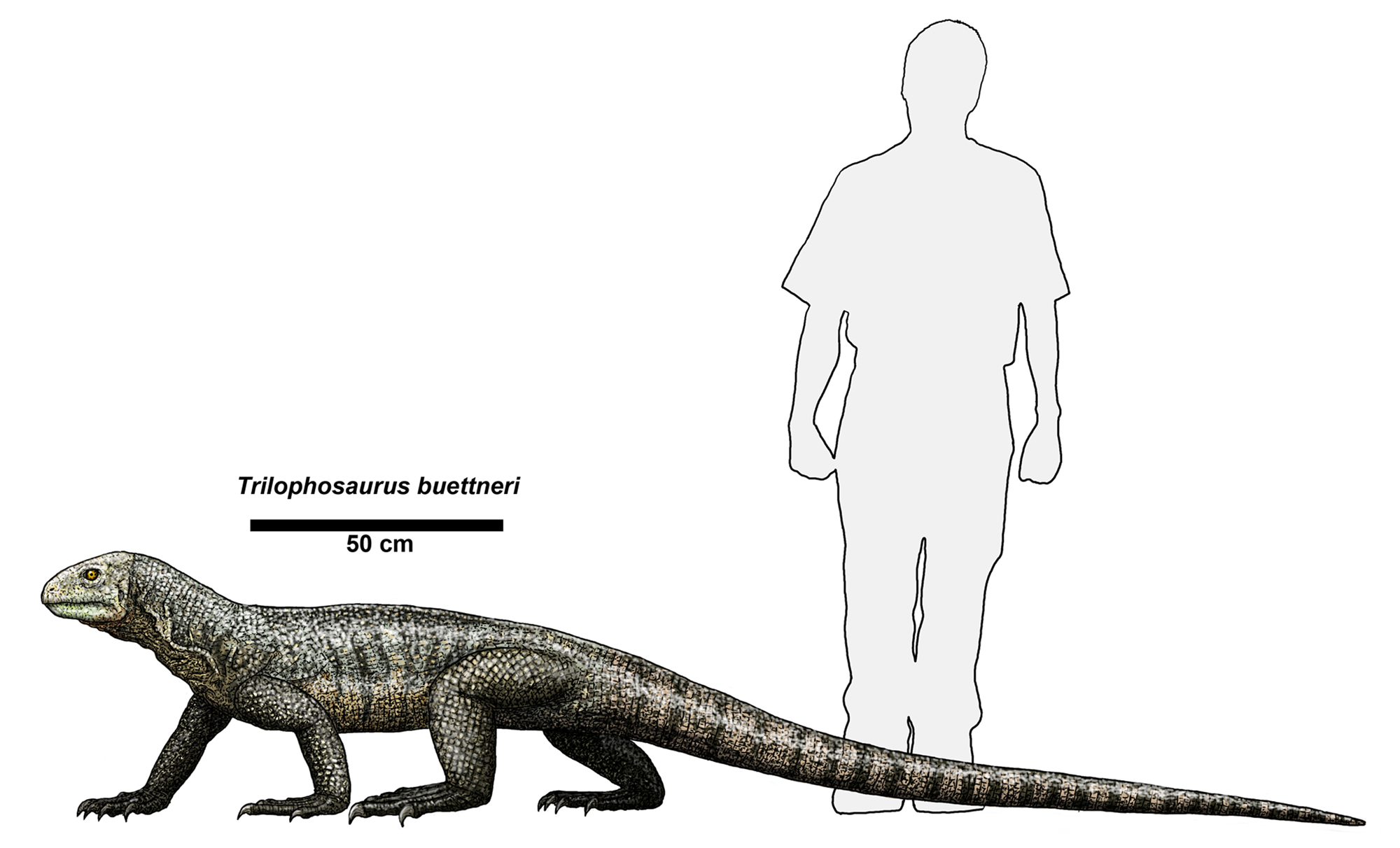
T. buettneri compared to a human.

The skull is also unusual in that the lower temporal opening is missing, giving the appearance of a euryapsid skull. Because of this, the trilophosaurs were once classified with placodonts within Sauropterygia. Carroll (1988) suggested that the lower opening may have been lost to strengthen the skull.

== Taxonomy ==
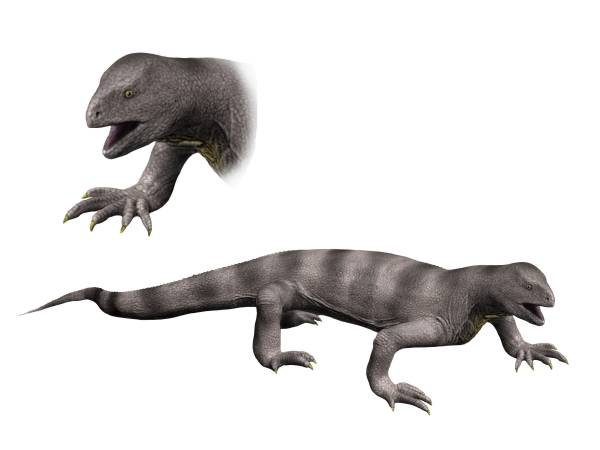
Life reconstruction of Trilophosaurus buettneri

Trilophosaurus is traditionally thought to include two valid species: the typical T. buettneri and the more robust T. jacobsi. In 1993, paleontologists Hans-Dieter Sues and Paul E. Olsen reassigned T. jacobsi, as well as two additional trilophosaurids (Tricuspisaurus and Variodens), to Procolophonidae based on similarities between its tricuspid teeth and those of the newly described procolophonid Xenodiphyodon. This view persisted in subsequent publications until the cranial material of T. jacobsi was described by Heckert et al. (2006). The new material confirmed the originally classification that T. jacobsi, as well as Tricuspisaurus and Variodens based on similarities to it, are indeed trilophosaurids. Meanwhile, a third species of Trilophosaurus, T. dornorum, was named by Mueller & Parker (2006) based on teeth of a robust individual. However, Spielmann et al. (2009) argued that the robustness of the new species is not sufficient to differentiate it from other Trilophosaurus species, especially in light of new robust specimens of T. jacobsi. Therefore, they considered T. dornorum to be a junior synonym of T. jacobsi, a view that was maintained since in other publications. Spielmann et al. (2006) redescribed the type material of Malerisaurus langstoni and concluded that it's indistinguishable from T. buettneri, and thus M. langstoni represents its synonym.

Nesbitt et al. (2015) performed a phylogenetic analysis focusing on relations within Allokotosauria and recovered T. jacobsi to be more closely related to Spinosuchus caseanus than to the type species of Trilophosaurus. To further test this possibility, the types of S. caseanus and T. jacobsi were scored separately from the referred the Kahle Trilophosaurus Quarry elements (referred to T. jacobsi by Spielmann et al. (2008) or to S. caseanus by Spielmann et al. (2009)). A phylogenetic analysis recovered the three in a monophyletic clade to the exclusion of T. buettneri based on a single autapomorphy. Furthermore, the types of S. caseanus and T. jacobsi as well as the Kahle Quarry material all scored identically, suggesting that T. jacobsi not only should be reassigned to Spinosuchus, but in fact represents the junior synonym of its type and only species (S. caseanus). Nesbitt et al. (2015) refrained from officially synonymizing the two taxa pending further study of other advanced trilophosaurids.

== Sources ==
- Benton, M. J. (2000), Vertebrate Paleontology, 2nd ed. Blackwell Science Ltd, p. 144
- Carroll, R. L. (1988), Vertebrate Paleontology and Evolution, W.H. Freeman & Co. p. 266
- Justin A. Spielmann (2008). The Late Triassic Archosauromorph Trilophosaurus. New Mexico Museum of Natural History and Science. pp. 1–177.
