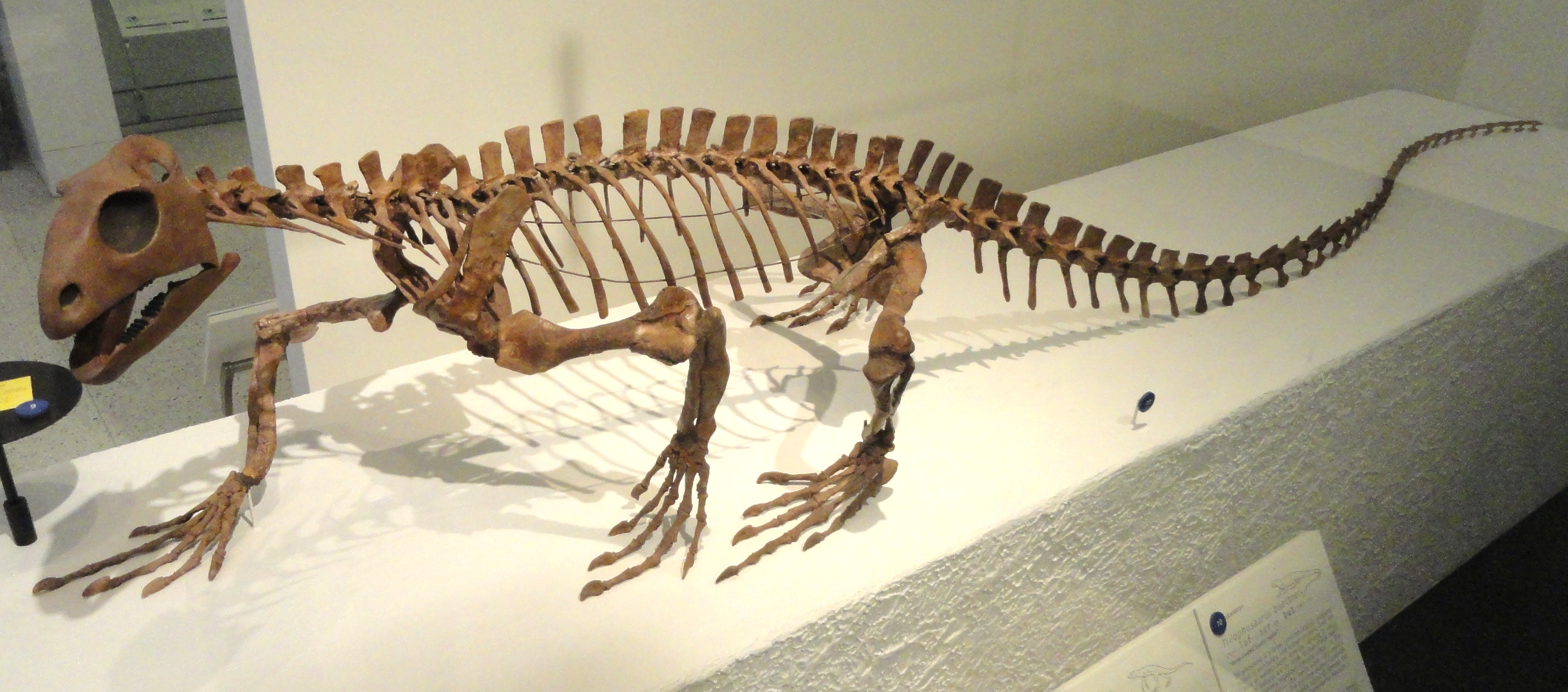
- Skeleton of Trilophosaurus buettneri
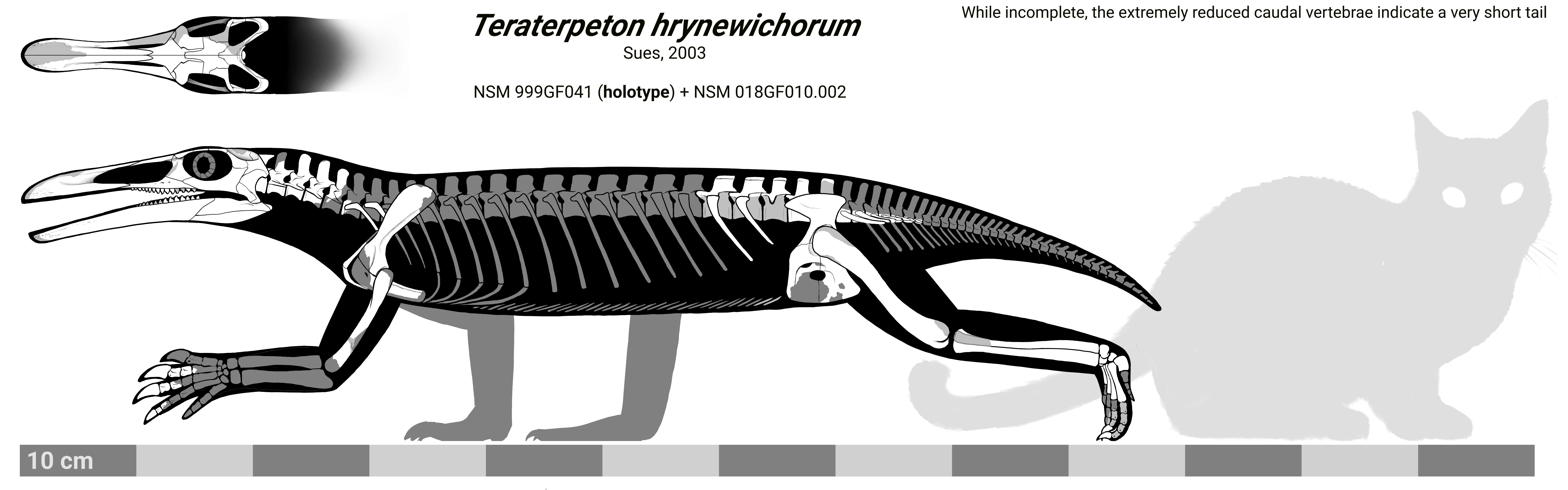
- Skeletal reconstruction of Teraterpeton

Scientific classification
- Kingdom: Animalia
- Phylum: Chordata
- Class: Reptilia
- Clade: Crocopoda
- Clade: †Allokotosauria; Nesbitt et al., 2015

Families
- †Arctosaurus?; †Cryptovaranoides?; †Drepanosauromorpha?; †Kuehneosauridae?; †Azendohsauridae; †Trilophosauridae

= Allokotosauria =

Allokotosauria Temporal range: Middle–Late Triassic, 247.2–201.3 Ma

Extinct clade of reptiles

Allokotosauria is a clade of early archosauromorph reptiles from the Middle to Late Triassic known from Asia, Africa, North America and Europe. Allokotosauria was first described and named when a new monophyletic grouping of specialized herbivorous archosauromorphs was recovered by Sterling J. Nesbitt, John J. Flynn, Adam C. Pritchard, J. Michael Parrish, Lovasoa Ranivoharimanana and André R. Wyss in 2015. The name Allokotosauria is derived from Greek meaning "strange reptiles" in reference to an unexpected grouping of early archosauromorphs with a high disparity of features typically associated with herbivory.

== History ==
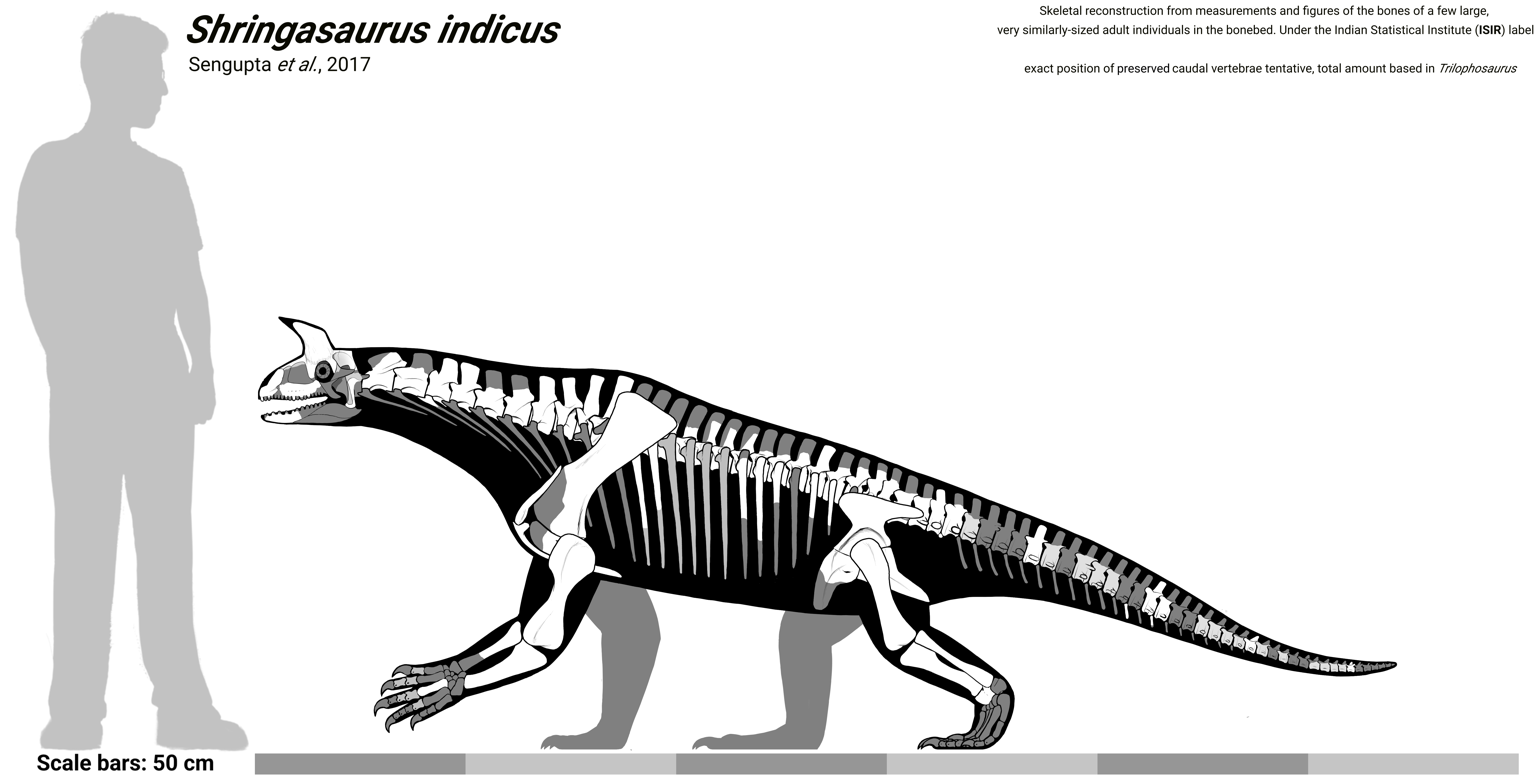
Skeletal reconstruction of Shringasaurus, the largest member of the clade.

Nesbitt et al. (2015) defined the group as a stem-based taxon containing Azendohsaurus madagaskarensis and Trilophosaurus buettneri and all taxa more closely related to them than to Tanystropheus longobardicus, Proterosuchus fergusi, Protorosaurus speneri or Rhynchosaurus articeps. Therefore, Allokotosauria includes the families Azendohsauridae and Trilophosauridae by definition, as well as the potentially more basal Pamelaria which is closer to them than to other early archosauromorphs. Pamelaria is the earliest known allokotosaur, dating to the Anisian of India. In 2015, azendohsauridae was represented by a single genus Azendohsaurus known from the Ladinian to Carnian of Africa, while trilophosaurids are mostly known from the Carnian to Norian stages of North America, England and potentially European Russia, though one member of the latter group, Variodens inopinatus, is known from Rhaetian. Since then, new discoveries have led to an expansion in generic diversity in azendohsaurids, including such taxa as Shringasaurus from Anisian India, and Puercosuchus from Norian North America, both of which also expand the clade's biogeographical and biostratigraphic range. According to studies of Arctosaurus material from Cameron Island in Canada, the latter may have been an allokotosaurian because of the similarities with Azendohsaurus due to the presence of a posterior ridge from the centrum to the diapophyses which extends from the diapophysis all the way to the posterior ventrolateral corner of the centrum. This ridge overhangs a deep groove in the lateral surface of the centrum.

== Description and phylogeny ==
Allokotosauria is most notably characterized by wrinkled side surface of orbital border of the frontal bone, expanded and hooked quadrate bone head on the posterior side, and a prominent tubercle developed above to the glenoid fossa of the scapula, although there are other unambiguous traits that differentiate it from other early archosauromorphs. Below is a cladogram showing the phylogenetic relationships of Allokotosauria within Archosauromorpha as recovered by Nesbitt et al. (2015). Ezcurra (2016) also recovered a highly supported Allokotosauria with the same topology (including only Pamelaria, Azendohsaurus madagaskarensis and Trilophosaurus buettneri in his analysis), but noted that Pamelaria is nearly as likely to represent a basal azendohsaurid instead.

- Archosauromorpha
  - Protorosaurus speneri
  - - Tanystropheidae
    - - Rhynchosauria
      - Crocopoda
        - Allokotosauria
          - Pamelaria dolichotrachela
          - - Trilophosauridae
              - Teraterpeton hrynewichorum
              - - Trilophosaurus buettneri
                - Spinosuchus caseanus (= "Trilophosaurus" jacobsi)
            - Azendohsauridae
              - Azendohsaurus laaroussii
              - Azendohsaurus madagaskarensis
        - - Prolacerta broomi
          - Archosauriformes

Sengupta et al. (2017) described a new azendohsaurid and recovered Pamelaria as an azendohsaurid.

- Archosauromorpha
  - Choristodera
  - - Aenigmastropheus
    - - Protorosaurus
      - - Prolacertoides
        - Jesairosaurus
        - Tanystropheidae
        - Allokotosauria
          - Trilophosauridae
            - Teraterpeton hrynewichorum
            - - Trilophosaurus buettneri
              - Spinosuchus caseanus (= "Trilophosaurus" jacobsi)
          - Azendohsauridae
            - Pamelaria dolichotrachela
            - - Shringasaurus indicus
              - - Azendohsaurus laaroussii
                - Azendohsaurus madagaskarensis
        - - Rhynchosauria
          - - Boreopricea
            - - Prolacertidae
              - - Tasmaniosaurus
                - Archosauriformes

Pritchard and Nesbitt (2017) found support for the inclusion of Kuehneosauridae within Allokotosauria.

- Sauria
  - Lepidosauromorpha
  - Archosauromorpha
    - Protorosaurus
    - - Tanystropheidae
      - - Rhynchosauria
        - - - Prolacerta
            - Archosauriformes
          - - Boreopricea
            - Allokotosauria
              - Azendohsauridae
              - - Kuehneosauridae
                - Trilophosauria

Buffa et al. (2024) recovered Drepanosauromorpha as allokotosaurian archosauromorphs, specifically as the sister group of trilophosaurids.

- Allokotosauria
  - Azendohsauridae
    - Malerisaurus robinsonae
    - - Azendohsaurus madagaskarensis
      - Pamelaria dolichotrachela
  - - Trilophosauridae
      - Teraterpeton hrynewichorum
      - - Spinosuchus caseanus
        - Trilophosaurus buettneri
    - Drepanosauromorpha
      - Avicranium renestoi
      - Hypuronector limnaios
      - - Vallesaurus cenensis
        - - Dolabrosaurus aquatilis
          - - Drepanosaurus unguicaudatus
            - Megalancosaurus preonensis
