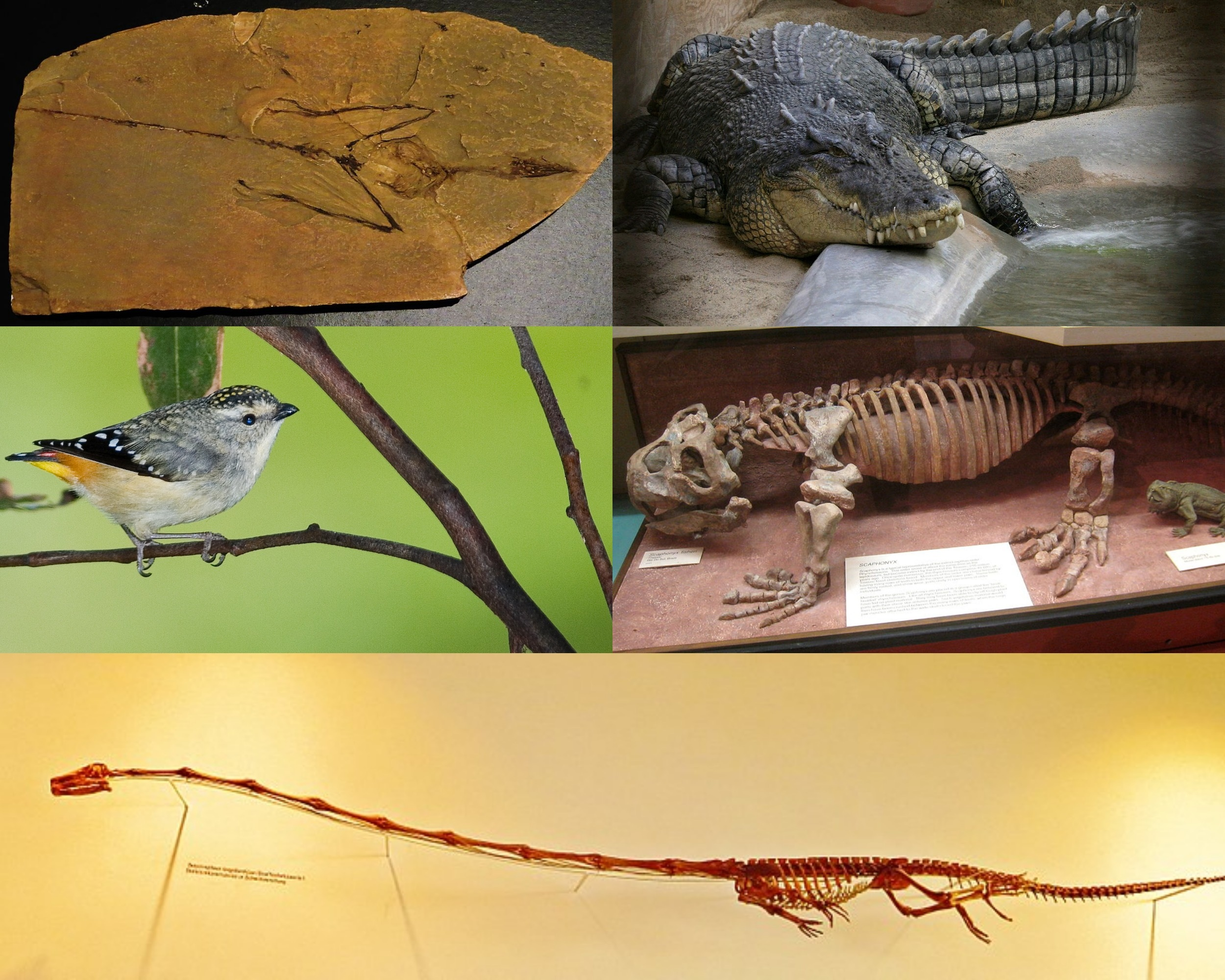
- Row 1: Sharovipteryx mirabilis and Crocodylus porosus Row 2: Pardalotus punctatus and Hyperodapedon fischeri Row 3: Tanystropheus longobardicus

Scientific classification
- Kingdom: Animalia
- Phylum: Chordata
- Class: Reptilia
- Clade: Sauria
- Clade: Archosauromorpha von Huene, 1946

Subgroups
- †Aenigmastropheus; †Elachistosuchus?; †Lukousaurus; †Lusitanosaurus?; †Manistropheus; †Prolacertoides; †Choristodera?; †Drepanosauromorpha?; †Helveticosauridae?; †Ichthyosauromorpha?; †Kuehneosauridae?; †Protorosauria (likely paraphyletic); †Sauropterygiformes?; †Tanysauria; †Thalattosauria?; Pantestudines?; Crocopoda Ezcurra, 2016; †Boreopricea; †Elessaurus?; †Tasmaniosaurus; †Teyujagua; †Allokotosauria; †Prolacertidae; †Rhynchosauria; Archosauriformes

= Archosauromorpha =

Archosauromorphs Temporal range: 260–0 Ma Possible Middle Permian records

Clade of reptiles

Archosauromorpha (Greek for "ruling lizard forms") is a clade of diapsid reptiles containing all reptiles more closely related to archosaurs (such as crocodilians and dinosaurs, including birds) than lepidosaurs (such as tuataras, lizards, and snakes). Archosauromorphs first appeared during the late Middle Permian or Late Permian, though they became much more common and diverse during the Triassic period.

Although Archosauromorpha was first named in 1946, its membership did not become well-established until the 1980s. Currently Archosauromorpha encompasses four main groups of reptiles: the stocky, herbivorous allokotosaurs and rhynchosaurs, the hugely diverse Archosauriformes, and a polyphyletic grouping of various long-necked reptiles including Protorosaurus, tanystropheids, and Prolacerta. Other groups including pantestudines (turtles and their extinct relatives) and the semiaquatic choristoderes have also been placed in Archosauromorpha by some authors.

Archosauromorpha is one of the most diverse groups of reptiles, but its members can be united by several shared skeletal characteristics. These include laminae on the vertebrae, a posterodorsal process of the premaxilla, a lack of notochordal canals, and the loss of the entepicondylar foramen of the humerus.

== History and definition ==
The term Archosauromorpha was first used by Friedrich von Huene in 1946 to refer to reptiles more closely related to archosaurs than to lepidosaurs. However, there was little consensus on ancient reptile relationships prior to the late 20th century, so the term Archosauromorpha was seldom used until many years after its creation.

The advent of cladistics helped to sort out at least some of the relationships within Reptilia, and it became clear that there was a split between the archosaur lineage and the lepidosaur lineage somewhere within the Permian, with certain reptiles clearly closer to archosaurs and others allied with lepidosaurs. Jacques Gauthier reused the term Archosauromorpha for the archosaur lineage at the 1982 annual meeting of the American Society of Zoologists, and later used it within his 1984 Ph.D. thesis. Archosauromorpha, as formulated by Gauthier, included four main groups of reptiles: Rhynchosauria, "Prolacertiformes", "Trilophosauria", and Archosauria (now equivalent to the group Archosauriformes). Cladistic analyses created during the 1980s by Gauthier, Michael J. Benton, and Susan E. Evans implemented Gauthier's classification scheme within large studies of reptile relations.

Michel Laurin (1991) defined Archosauromorpha as a node-based clade containing the most recent common ancestor of Prolacerta, Trilophosaurus, Hyperodapedon and all of its descendants. David Dilkes (1998) formulated a more inclusive (and more common) definition of Archosauromorpha, defining it as a branch-based total group clade containing Protorosaurus and all other saurians that are more closely related to Protorosaurus than to Lepidosauria. Gauthier, as an author for Phylonyms (2020), redefined Archosauromorpha as a node-based clade containing Gallus, Alligator, Mesosuchus, Trilophosaurus, Prolacerta, and Protorosaurus. The new name Pan-Archosauria was established for the broader total group of Archosauromorpha, similar to the definition of Dilkes (1998).

In 2016, Martin Ezcurra named a subgroup of Archosauromorpha, Crocopoda ("crocodile feet"). Crocopoda is defined as all archosauromorphs more closely related to allokotosaurs (specifically Azendohsaurus and Trilophosaurus), rhynchosaurs (specifically Rhynchosaurus), or archosauriforms (specifically Proterosuchus) rather than Protorosaurus or tanystropheids (specifically Tanystropheus). This group roughly corresponds to Laurin's definition of Archosauromorpha.

== Members ==
=== Unambiguous members ===
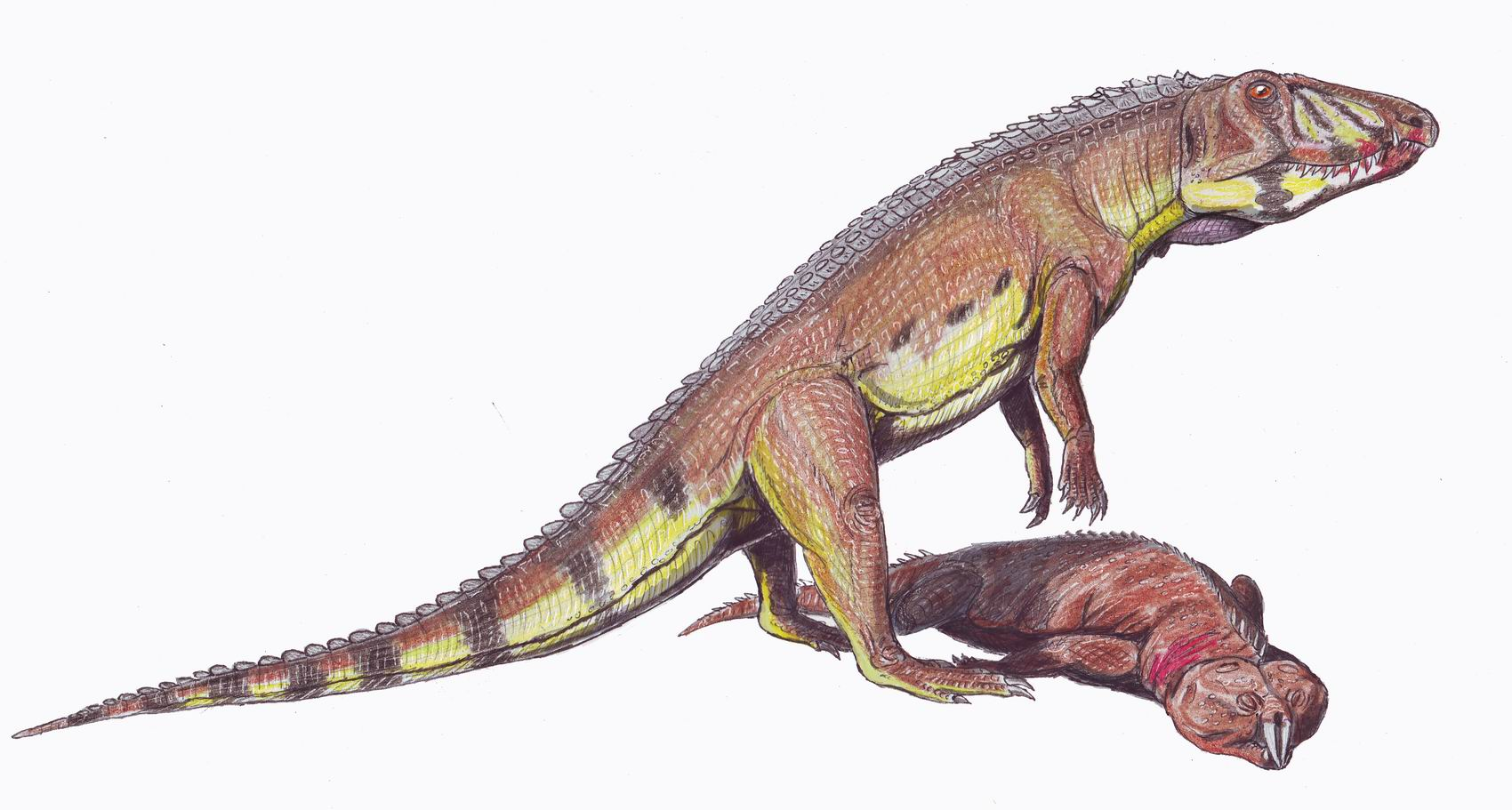
An interaction between two archosauromorphs: Ornithosuchus ( a member of Archosauriformes) scavenging on Hyperodapedon (a rhynchosaur)

Since the seminal studies of the 1980s, Archosauromorpha has consistently been found to contain four specific reptile groups, although the definitions and validity of the groups themselves have been questioned. The least controversial group is Rhynchosauria ("beak reptiles"), a monophyletic clade of stocky herbivores. Many rhynchosaurs had highly modified skulls, with beak-like premaxillary bones and wide heads.

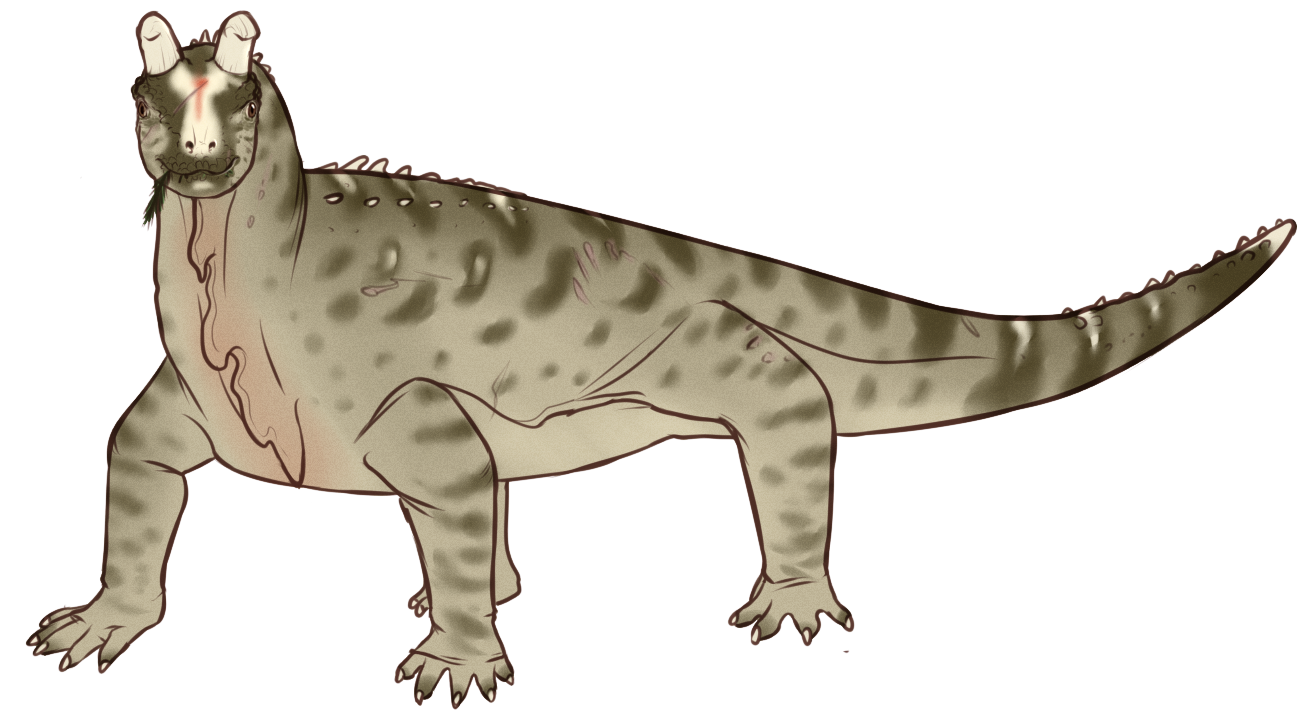
Shringasaurus, a horned allokotosaurian from the family Azendohsauridae.

Another group of archosauromorphs has traditionally been represented by Trilophosaurus, an unusual iguana-like herbivorous reptile quite different from the rhynchosaurs. Gauthier used the name "Trilophosauria" for this group, but a 2015 study offered an alternative name. This study found that Azendohsauridae, Triassic reptiles previously mistaken for "prosauropod" dinosaurs, were in fact close relatives of Trilophosaurus and the rest of Trilophosauridae. Trilophosaurids and azendohsaurids are now united under the group Allokotosauria ("strange reptiles"). These two groups did not survive the end of the Triassic period, but the most famous group of archosauromorphs not only survived, but have continued to diversify and dominate beyond the Triassic-Jurassic extinction. These were the Archosauriformes, a diverse assortment of animals including the famous dinosaurs and pterosaurs. Two subclades of Archosauriformes survive to the present day: the semiaquatic crocodilians and the last of the feathered dinosaurs: birds. Gauthier used the name Archosauria to refer to what is now called the Archosauriformes; in modern studies, the name Archosauria has a more restricted definition that only includes the ancestors of crocodilians (i.e. Pseudosuchia) and birds (i.e. Avemetatarsalia).

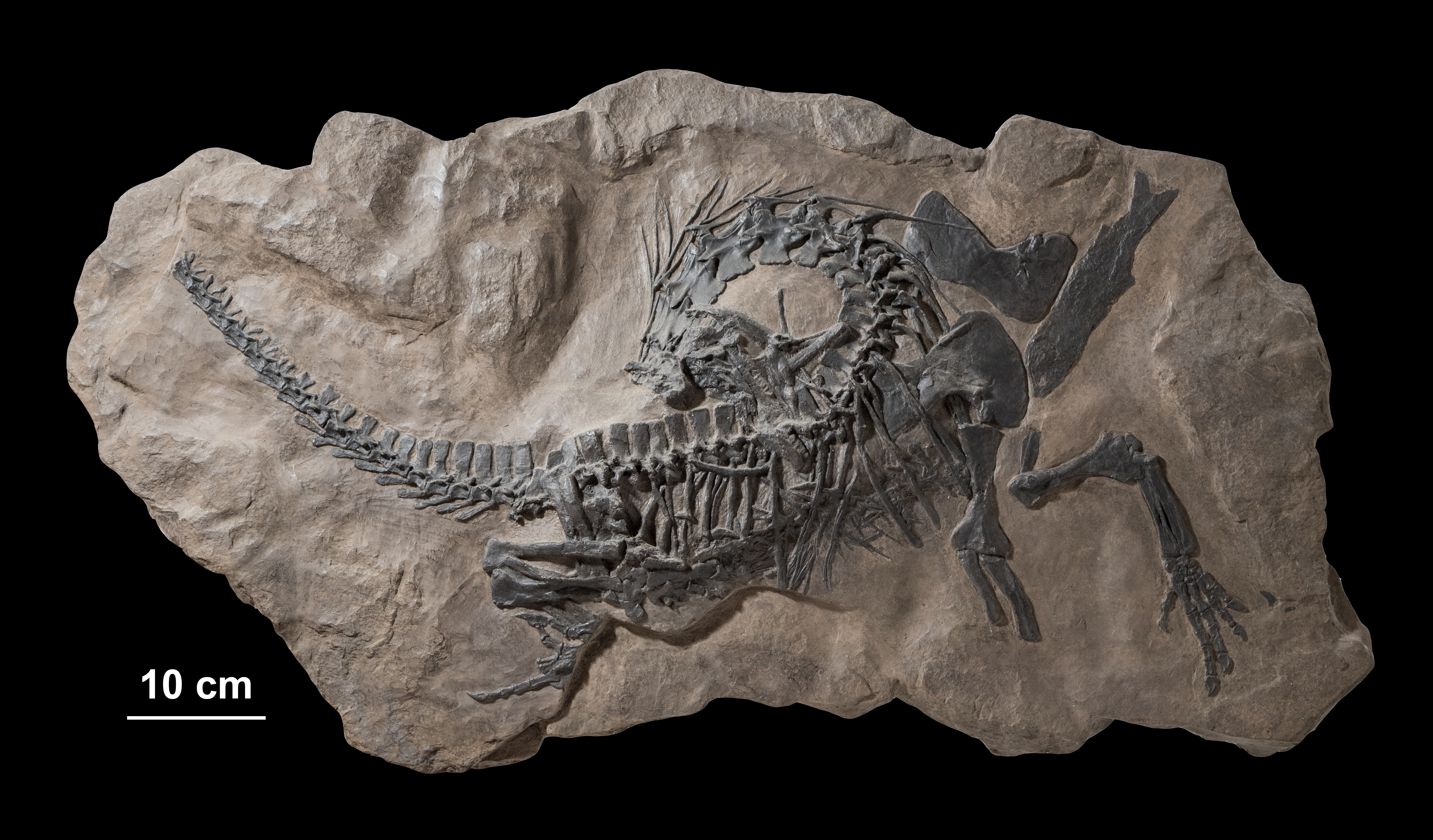
The skeleton of Protorosaurus, one of the oldest archosauromorphs and namesake of the problematic group "Protorosauria"

The final unambiguous members of Archosauromorpha represent the most controversial group. These were the first archosauromorphs to appear, and can be characterized by their long necks, sprawling posture, and carnivorous habits. One name for the group, Protorosauria, is named after Protorosaurus, the oldest archosauromorph known from good remains. Another name, Prolacertiformes, is in reference to a different member, Prolacerta. Protorosauria/Prolacertiformes has had a complicated history, and many taxa have entered and left the group as paleontologists discover and re-evaluate reptiles of the Triassic. By far the most famous of these are tanystropheids such as Tanystropheus, known for having necks longer than their entire body. Other notable genera include Boreopricea, Pamelaria, and Macrocnemus, as well as strange gliding reptiles such as Sharovipteryx and Mecistotrachelos. A landmark 1998 study by David Dilkes completely deconstructed the concept of Prolacertiformes as a traditional monophyletic group (i.e. one whose members have a single common ancestor). He argued that Prolacerta was much closer to Archosauriformes than to other "prolacertiforms", invalidating the name. Likewise, Pamelaria is now considered an allokotosaur, Macrocnemus is a tanystropheid, and Protorosaurus may be too basal ("primitive") to form a clade with any of its supposed close relatives. As such, this final group of Archosauromorpha is generally considered paraphyletic or polyphyletic, and few modern studies use it.

=== Disputed members ===
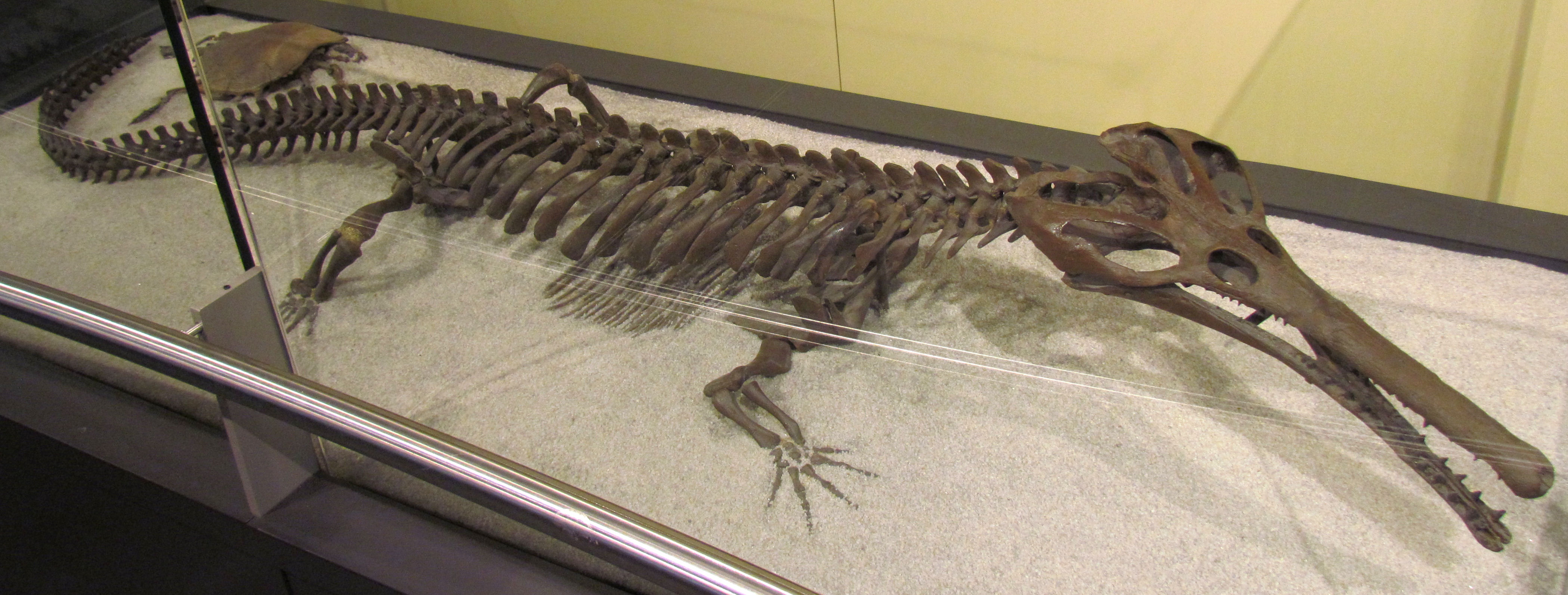
Champsosaurus, a gharial-like choristodere which survived the Cretaceous-Paleocene extinction event. Choristoderes may represent the fifth group of archosauromorphs, but their origin is obscured.

Apart from these four groups, Archosauromorpha is sometimes considered to encompass several additional groups of reptiles. One of the most common additions is Choristodera, a group of semiaquatic reptiles with mysterious origins. Although choristodere fossils are only known from the Jurassic through the Miocene, it is theorized that they first appeared during the Permian alongside the earliest archosauromorphs. Choristoderes share numerous otherwise unique traits with archosauromorphs, but they share an equal or greater number of unique traits with lepidosauromorphs as well, so there is still some debate over their inclusion within either group. The chameleon- or tamandua-like drepanosaurs are also semi-regularly placed within Archosauromorpha, although some studies have considered them to be part of a much more basal lineage of reptiles. The aquatic thalattosaurs and gliding kuehneosaurids are also irregularly considered archosauromorphs.

Genetic studies have found evidence that modern testudines (turtles and tortoises) are more closely related to crocodilians than to lizards. If this evidence is accurate, then turtles are part of basal Archosauromorpha. Likewise, extinct turtle relatives known as Pantestudines would also fall within Archosauromorpha. Some geneticists have proposed a name to refer to reptiles within the group formed by relatives of turtles and archosaurs. This name is the clade Archelosauria. Since Pantestudines may encompass the entire aquatic reptile order Sauropterygia, this means that Archosauromorpha (as Archelosauria) may be a much wider group than commonly believed. However, anatomical data disagrees with this genetic evidence, instead placing Pantestudines within Lepidosauromorpha but many modern studies have supported Archelosauria. Several recent studies place sauropterygians within Archosauromorpha group, forming a large clade including Ichthyosauromorpha and Thalattosauria as opposed to the Pantestudine relations.

== Anatomy ==
Although the most diverse clade of living archosauromorphs are birds, early members of the group were evidently reptilian, superficially similar to modern lizards. When archosauromorphs first appeared in the fossil record in the Permian, they were represented by long-necked, lightly built sprawling reptiles with moderately long, tapering snouts. This body plan, similar to that of modern monitor lizards, is also shared by Triassic archosauromorphs such as tanystropheids and Prolacerta. Other early groups such as trilohpsaurids, azendohsaurids, and rhynchosaurs deviate from this body plan by evolving into stockier forms with semi-erect postures and higher metabolisms. The archosauriforms went to further extremes of diversity, encompassing giant sauropod dinosaurs, flying pterosaurs and birds, semiaquatic crocodilians, phytosaurs, and proterochampsians, and apex predators such as erythrosuchids, pseudosuchians, and theropod dinosaurs. Despite the staggering diversity of archosauromorphs, they can still be united as a clade thanks to several subtle skeletal features.

=== Skull ===
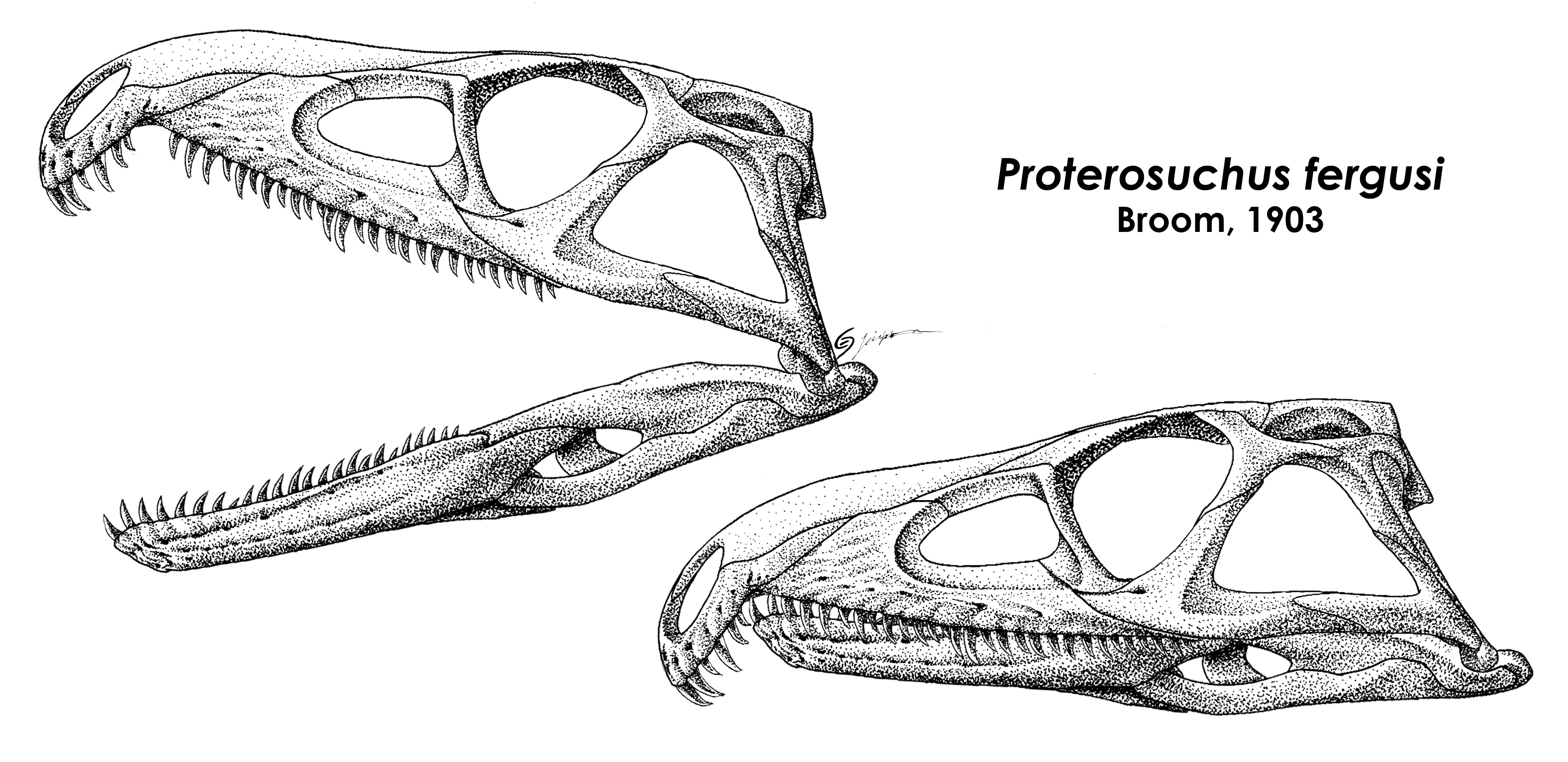
The skull of Proterosuchus, an early archosauriform. Note the long rear branch of the downturned premaxilla and the L-shaped quadratojugal near the jaw joint.

Most archosauromorphs more "advanced" than Protorosaurus possessed an adaptation of the premaxilla (tooth-bearing bone at the tip of the snout) known as a posterodorsal or postnarial process. This was a rear-facing branch of bone that stretched up below and behind the external nares (nostril holes) to contact the nasal bones on the upper edge of the snout. A few advanced archosauriforms reacquired the plesiomorphic ("primitive") state present in other reptiles, that being a short or absent posterodorsal process of the premaxilla, with the rear edge of the nares formed primarily by the maxilla bones instead. As for the nares themselves, they were generally large and oval-shaped, positioned high and close to the midline of the skull.

Many early archosauromorphs, including Protorosaurus, tanystropheids, Trilophosaurus, and derived rhynchosaurs, have a blade-like sagittal crest on the parietal bones at the rear part of the skull roof, between a pair of holes known as the supratemporal (or upper temporal) fenestrae. However, in other allokotosaurs, the basal rhynchosaur Mesosuchus, and more crownward archosauromorphs, the sagittal crest is weakly differentiated, although the inner edge of each supratemporal fenestra still possessed a depressed basin of bone known as a supratemporal fossa. Ezcurra (2016) argued that presence of supratemporal fossae and an absence or poor development of the sagittal crest could be used to characterize Crocopoda. He also noted that in almost all early archosauromorphs (and some choristoderes), the parietal bones have an additional lowered area which extends transversely (from left to right) behind the supratemporal fenestrae and sagittal crest (when applicable).

The lower temporal fenestra is not fully enclosed in early archosauromorphs (and choristoderes) due to alterations to the structure of the quadratojugal bone at the rear lower corner of the skull. This bone is roughly L-shaped in these taxa, with a tall dorsal process (vertical branch), a short anterior process (forward branch), and a tiny or absent posterior process (rear branch). The bones surrounding the quadratojugal also reconfigure to offset the changes to the quadratojugal. For example, the lower branch of the squamosal bone is shortened to offset the tall dorsal process of quadratojugal which connects to it. On the other hand, the rear branch jugal bone lengthens to fill some of the space left by the shortening of the anterior process of the quadratojugal. In archosauriforms, the jugal even re-encloses the lower temporal fenestra. The stapes are long, thin, and solid, without a perforating hole (stapedial foramen) present in the more robust stapes of other reptiles.

=== Vertebrae ===
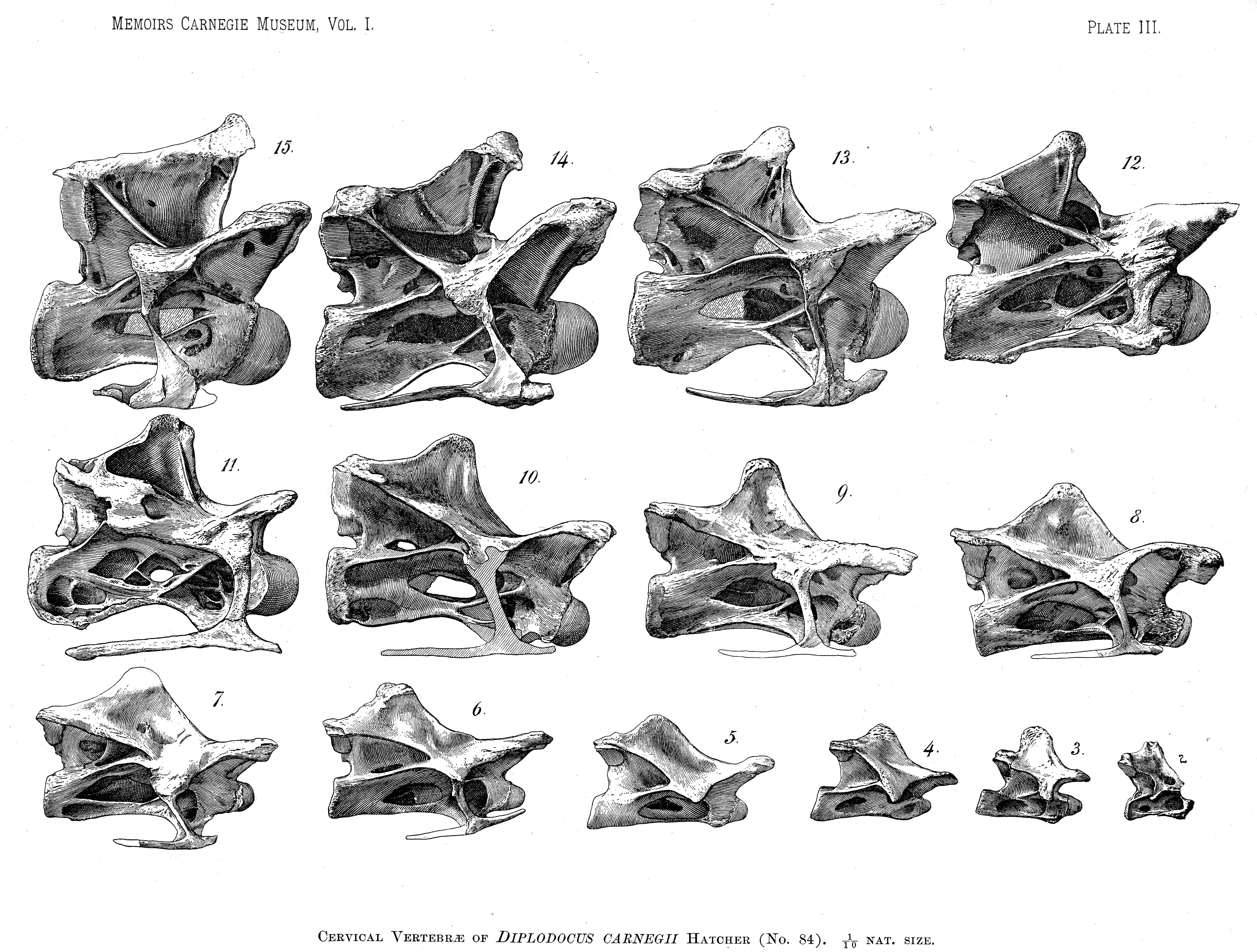
Cervical vertebrae from Diplodocus, a sauropod dinosaur (Archosauriformes). As with other long-necked archosauromorphs, sauropods had a complex system of laminae on their vertebrae.

In conjunction with their long, S-shaped necks, early archosauromorphs had several adaptations of the cervical (neck) vertebrae, and usually the first few dorsal (back) vertebrae as well. The centrum (main body) of each vertebra is parallelogram-shaped, with a front surface typically positioned higher than the rear surface. The transverse processes (rib facets) of these vertebrae extend outwards to a greater extent than in other early reptiles. In many long-necked archosauromorphs, the rib facets are slanted, connecting to cervical ribs that are often long, thin, and dichocephalous (two-headed).

Thin, plate-like ridges known as laminae develop to connect the vertebral components, sloping down from the elongated transverse processes to the centra. Laminae are practically unique to archosauromorphs, being present even in the earliest Permian genera such as Aenigmastropheus and Eorasaurus. However, they are also known to occur in the bizarre semiaquatic reptile Helveticosaurus, as well as the biarmosuchian synapsid Hipposaurus. In all adult archosauromorphs with the exception of Aenigmastropheus, the vertebrae lack notochordal canals, holes which perforate the centra. This also sets the archosauromorphs apart from most other Permian and Triassic reptiles.

=== Forelimbs ===
The humerus (upper arm bone) is solid in archosauromorphs, completely lacking a hole near the elbow known as the entepicondylar foramen. This hole, present in most other tetrapods, is also absent in choristoderes yet not fully enclosed in some proterosuchids. In many advanced archosauromorphs, the capitulum and trochlea (elbow joints) of the humerus are poorly developed. Early archosauromorphs retain well-developed elbow joints, but all archosauromorphs apart from Aenigmastropheus have a trochlea (ulna joint) which is shifted towards the outer surface of the humerus, rather than the midpoint of the elbow as in other reptiles. In conjunction with this shift, the olecranon process of the ulna is poorly developed in archosauromorphs apart from Aenigmastropheus and Protorosaurus.

=== Hindlimbs ===
The ankle bones of archosauromorphs tend to acquire complex structures and interactions with each other, and this is particularly the case with the large proximal tarsal bones: the astragalus and calcaneum. The calcaneum, for example, has a tube-like outer extension known as a calcaneal tuber in certain archosauromorphs. This tuber is particularly prominent in the ancient relatives of crocodylians, but it first appeared earlier at the last common ancestor of allokotosaurs, rhynchosaurs, and archosauriforms. The presence of a calcaneal tuber (sometimes known as a lateral tuber of the calcaneum) is a synapomorphy of the group Crocopoda, and is also responsible for its name.

== Relationships ==
The cladogram shown below follows the most likely result found by an analysis of turtle relationships using both fossil and genetic evidence by M.S. Lee, in 2013.

- Crown Reptilia/ Sauria
  - Pan-Lepidosauria / Lepidosauromorpha
  - Archelosauria/ Archosauromorpha s. l.
    - Pan-Testudines/ Pantestudines
      - †Eosauropterygia
      - - †Placodontia
        - - †Sinosaurosphargis
          - - †Odontochelys
            - Testudinata
              - †Proganochelys
              - Testudines
    - Pan‑Archosauria
      - †Choristodera
      - Archosauromorpha s. s.
        - †Prolacertiformes
        - - - †Trilophosaurus
            - †Rhynchosauria
          - Archosauriformes

The following cladogram is based on a large analysis of archosauriforms published by M.D. Ezcurra in 2016.

- Sauria
  - Lepidosauromorpha
  - †Choristodera
  - Archosauromorpha
    - - †Aenigmastropheus
      - - †Protorosaurus
        - - †Tanystropheidae
          - Crocopoda
            - †Allokotosauria
              - †Pamelaria
              - - †Azendohsaurus
                - †Trilophosaurus
            - - †Rhynchosauria
              - - †Boreopricea
                - - †Prolacertidae
                  - - †Tasmaniosaurus
                    - Archosauriformes

Cladogram after Jenkins et al. 2026:, which found Pantestudines (including modern turtles and tortoises) to be nested within Archosauromorpha.

- Sauria/Reptilia
  - Lepidosauromorpha
  - Archosauromorpha
    - †Sauropterygia (including Plesiosauria)
    - - †Protorosaurus
      - Archelosauria
        - Pantestudines
        - - †Tanystropheidae
          - Crocopoda
            - †Prolacerta
            - - †Allokotosauria
              - - †Rhynchosauria
                - - †Teyujagua
                  - Archosauriformes (including Archosauria)
