= Hans-Dieter Sues =

German-born American paleontologist (1956–2026)

- Sues with a cast of a Brontosaurus skull at the Smithsonian
- Born: 13 January 1956; Rheydt, North Rhine-Westphalia, West Germany
- Died: 22 February 2026 (aged 70); Vienna, Virginia, U.S.
- Occupation: Paleontologist
- Awards: Alexander von Humboldt Prize (2010)

Hans-Dieter Sues (13 January 1956 – 21 February 2026) was a German-born American palaeontologist who was a Senior Research Geologist and Curator of Vertebrate Paleontology at the National Museum of Natural History of the Smithsonian Institution in Washington, DC.

== Life and career ==
Sues attended the Johannes Gutenberg-Universität Mainz, the University of Alberta, and Harvard University (Ph.D., 1984). He did work at McGill University and was a research paleobiologist at the Smithsonian before taking a role at the Royal Ontario Museum, where he was vice-president of collections and research.

In 1998, Sues was elected a Fellow of the American Association for the Advancement of Science. In 2002, he moved to the Carnegie Museum of Natural History, becoming their curator of vertebrate paleontology. From 2002 to 2004, he was also the president of the Society of Vertebrate Paleontology. In 2003, Sues was elected a Fellow of the Royal Society of Canada. In 2010, he was awarded an Alexander von Humboldt Prize for Excellence in Research and Teaching.

Sues published on a wide range of extinct Mesozoic and Paleozoic tetrapods, including temnospondyls, early reptiles, synapsids, turtles, dinosaurs, other archosauromorphs, and lepidosauromorphs. He also contributed to studies on the evolution of herbivory and faunal transitions. He primarily studied taxa from North America and Europe. The pachycephalosaur Hanssuesia is named for him.

Sues died on 21 February 2026, at the age of 70.
