= Bukobay Svita =

Geologic formation in Russia

- Stratigraphic range: Ladinian; ~242–235 Ma
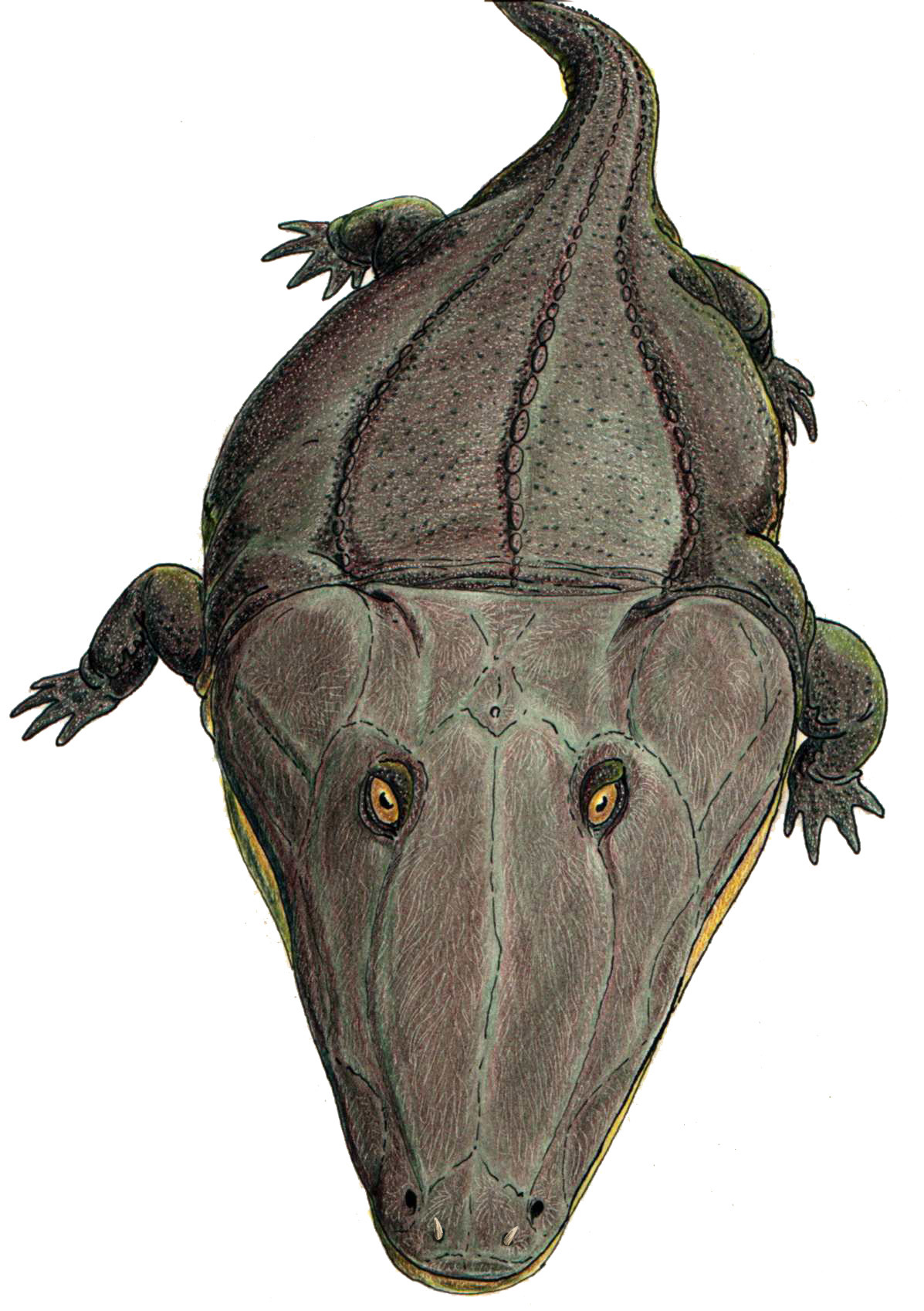
- "Mastodonsaurus" torvus, an index fossil of the Bukobay Svita / Gorizont
- Type: Stratigraphic Formation
- Overlies: Donguz Svita

Lithology
- Primary: Claystone, siltstone
- Other: Sandstone

Location
- Coordinates: 51.4°N 55.5°E
- Approximate paleocoordinates: 35.4°N 41.0°E
- Region: Orenburg, Bashkortostan
- Country: Russia
- Bukobay Svita (Russia)

The Bukobay Svita (also anglicized as Bukobay or Bukobai Formation) is a Middle Triassic geological unit in Russia. It is composed primarily of red or grey lacustrine sediments, reconstructing a humid and marshy depositional environment. Bukobay is the youngest section of a Triassic terrestrial succession exposed south of the Ural Mountains. It is equivalent to a biostratigraphic unit, the Bukobay Gorizont, which is also called the "Bukobay Horizon" or "Mastodonsaurus" fauna).

== Fossil content ==
Notable components of the Bukobay fauna include Mastodonsaurus torvus (a giant capitosaur amphibian), Malutinisuchus gratus, Plagiosternum danilovi, Synesuchus muravjevi, Jushatyria vjushkovi and Energosuchus garjainovi, the insects Mesoneta uralensis and Triassomachilis uralensis, Elatosaurus facetus, dicynodonts Planitorostris pechoriensis, Elephantosaurus jachimovitschi (a large dicynodont), and Chalishevia cothurnata (the youngest known erythrosuchid). Temnospondyls include Bukobaja enigmatica, Plagioscutum caspiense and Plagiorophus paraboliceps, with Ceratodus orenburgensis, C. jecticristatus, C. gracilis and C. bucobaensis as fish. The flora is also diverse, including Equisetites arenaceus (a species of giant horsetails), Echinostachys cylindrica, Neocalamites rugosus and N. uralensis, ferns Cladophlebis shensiensis, Danaeopsis rarinervisand, Lepidopteris microcellularis, ginkgophytes Sphenobaiera granulifer, Glossophyllum sp., cycadophytes Apoldia surakaica, pollen Chordasporites singulichrda and Ilinites chitonoides, and Ladinian-age palynomorphs. Also found in the formation were unidentified species from the genus Mastodonsaurus sp., Cyclotosaurus sp., Pistosaurus sp., Plagiosuchus sp., Bukobaja sp. and Chalishevia sp., as well as remains from the order Theriodontia indet., Kannemeyeroidea indet. and Mastodonsauridae indet..

== See also ==
- Triassic land vertebrate faunachrons
- Donguz Formation, underlying fossiliferous formation in Russia
- Erfurt Formation, contemporaneous fossiliferous formation in Germany
- Wetterstein Formation, contemporaneous fossiliferous formation of the Alps
- Omingonde Formation, contemporaneous fossiliferous formation of Namibia
- Santa Maria Formation, contemporaneous fossiliferous formation of Brazil
