= Donguz =

Donguz may refer to:

- Donguz (river), a tributary of the Ural in Russia
- Donguz Formation, Russia
- Donguz range, Russia
- Donguz explosion, an incident at the Donguz range in 2012
- Donguz, a former name the settlement of Pervomaysky, Orenburgsky District, Orenburg Oblast (ru:Первомайский (Оренбургский район))
- Donguz, Baltaysky District, a village in Russia

== See also ==
- Donguz-Orun
