= Donguz Formation =

Geologic formation in Russia

- Stratigraphic range: Anisian; ~247–242 Ma
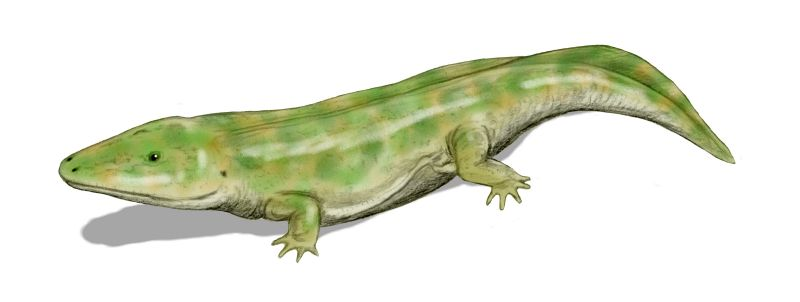
- Eryosuchus, an index fossil of the Donguz
- Type: Stratigraphic Formation
- Underlies: Bukobay Svita
- Overlies: Petropavlovskaya Svita (Yarenskian Gorizont)

Lithology
- Primary: Sandstone
- Other: Claystone, conglomerate

Location
- Coordinates: 51.5°N 55.2°E
- Approximate paleocoordinates: 33.6°N 43.2°E
- Region: Bashkortostan; Orenburg Oblast
- Country: Russia

Type section
- Named for: Donguz River
- Donguz Formation (Russia)

The Donguz Formation, Donguz Svita, or Donguz Rocks (Russian: Донгузские скалы/Донгузская свита/Формация Донгуз) is a Middle Triassic geological formation that crops out on the right bank of the Donguz River in Orenburg Oblast, Russia, across the settlement of Pervomaisky. The formation is equivalent to a biostratigraphic unit, the Donguz Gorizont. It is famous for its rich collection of the fossils of Middle Triassic tetrapods.

It is a nature monument (особо охраняемых природных территорий (ООПТ)).

== Fossil content ==
The following fossils have been found in the Donguz Formation:

- Archosaurs
  - Dongusuchus efremovi
  - Jushatyria vjushkovi
  - Sarmatosuchus otschevi
  - Vjushkovisaurus berdjanensis
  - Archosauria indet.
- Bystrowianidae indet.
- Dicynodonts
  - Cristonasus koltaeviensi
  - Calleonasus furvus
  - Elatosaurus facetus
  - Nasoplanites danilovi
  - Parvobestiola bashkiriensis
  - Rabidosaurus cristatus
  - Rhadiodromus klimovi (previously Lystrosaurus klimovi), R. mariae
  - Rhinodicynodon gracile
  - ?Edaxosaurus edentatus (is currently considered a synonym of Uralokannemeyeria)
  - Uralokannemeyeria vjuschkovi (former Kannemeyeria vjuschkovi)
  - Dicynodontia indet.
  - Kannemeyeriiformes indet.
- Erythrosuchids
  - Uralosaurus magnus
  - Garjainia prima (previously Vjushkovia tripliocostata)
- Euparkeriidae
  - Dorosuchus neoetus
- Pseudosuchia indet.
- Procolophonid
  - Kapes majmesculae (previously K. serotinus)
- Rauisuchidae
  - Dongusia colorata
- Traversodontidaes
  - Scalenodon boreus
- Thecodontia indet.
- Temnospondyls
  - Eryosuchus antiquus, E. garjainovi, E. tverdochlebovi, Eryosuchus sp.
  - Plagiorophus danilovi, P. paraboliceps
  - Plagioscutum ochevi
  - Plagiosternum paraboliceps
  - Bukobaja sp.
  - Mastodonsauridae indet.
- Therocephalians
  - Dongusaurus schepetovi
  - Nothogomphodon danilovi
  - Antecosuchus ochevi, A. boreus
  - Bauriidae indet.
- Fish
  - Ceratodus bucobaensis, C. recticristatus, C. jechartiensis, C. gracilis, C. orenburgensis, C. donensis, Ceratodus sp.
  - Elasmobranchii indet.

== See also ==
- Bukobay Formation
- Triassic land vertebrate faunachrons
