= Megalophthalma =

Megalophthalma Temporal range: Middle Triassic

Scientific classification
- Kingdom: Animalia
- Phylum: Chordata
- Clade: Tetrapoda
- Order: †Temnospondyli
- Suborder: †Stereospondyli
- Family: †Plagiosauridae
- Genus: †Megalophthalma; Schoch et al., 2014

Type species
- †Megalophthalma ockerti Schoch et al., 2014

Extinct genus of amphibians

Megalophthalma (meaning "large eye" from the Greek megale ["large"] and ophthalmós ["eye"]) is an extinct genus of temnospondyl amphibian belonging to the family Plagiosauridae. It is represented by the single type species Megalophthalma ockerti from the Middle Triassic Erfurt Formation in southern Germany, which is itself based on a single partial skull and a fragment of the lower jaw. Megalophthalma is distinguished from other temnospondyls by its very large orbits or eye sockets, which occupy most of the skull and are bordered by thin struts of bone. Like those of most plagiosaurids, the skull is flat, wide, and roughly triangular. The orbits are pentagon-shaped. The bones at the back of the skull (the occiput) are highly modified and show similarities with those of the plagiosaurid Plagiosternum. Both Megalophthalma and Plagiosternum lack prefrontal and postfrontal bones. In fact, Megalophthalma and Plagiosternum are thought to form their own clade or evolutionary grouping within Plagiosauridae called Plagiosterninae. In overall form Megalophthalma and Plagiosternum are intermediate between the basal plagiosaurid Plagiosuchus (which more closely resembles non-plagiosaurid temnospondyls) and the derived Gerrothorax (which has an even more highly modified skull than plagiosternines).

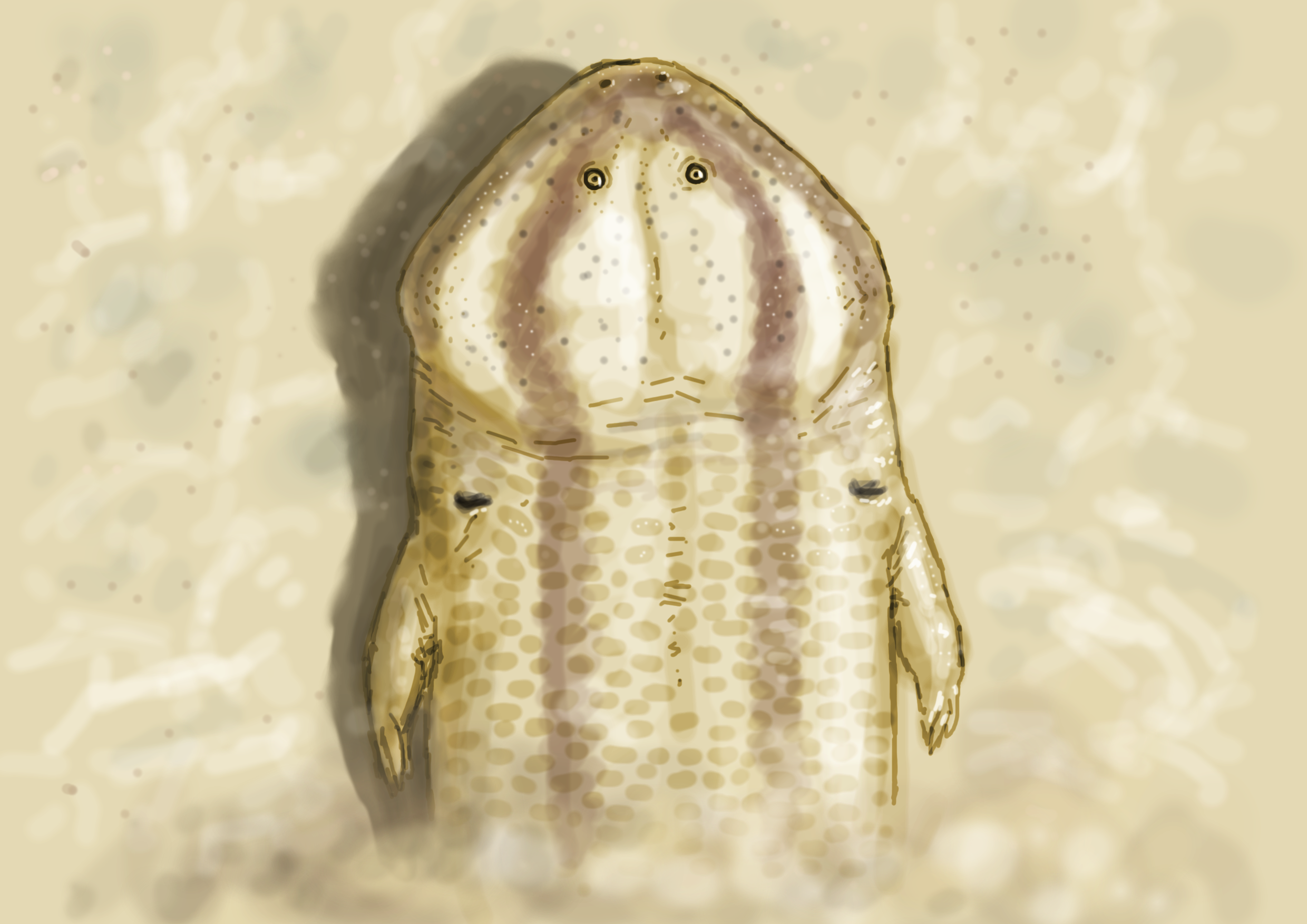
Life restoration in shallow water

The authors who originally described Megalophthalma hypothesized that it and other plagiosaurids had eyes that were much smaller than the orbits. Most reconstructions of plagiosaurids, particularly those of Gerrothorax, show them having flattened eyes that fill up most of the orbits. However, a flattened eye is extremely unlikely because the lens would be too close to the retina to focus an image. Megalophthalma and other plagiosaurids more likely had spherical eyes like those of modern amphibians. The skull of Megalophthalma is too shallow for a spherical eye the width of the orbit to fit within it, so the eye was probably much smaller, perhaps less than 1 centimetre (0.39 in) in diameter. The eye was probably positioned near the front of the orbit as in modern small-eyed amphibians like cryptobranchid salamanders and pipid frogs. Another possibility, although far less likely, is that Megalophthalma and other plagiosaurids had eyes similar to those of the living deep-sea fish Ipnops, which are reduced to sheet-like retina that cover the upper surface of the skull and are only able to detect movement from shadows. Like Ipnops, plagiosaurids are hypothesized to have rested on the bottom of bodies of water and ambushed prey that swam above them. However, Ipnops and plagiosaurids are very distantly related, making it unlikely that lensless eyes evolved in Megalophthalma.
