= Erfurt Formation =

Lithostratigraphic unit in Europe

- Stratigraphic range: Ladinian; ~242–237 Ma
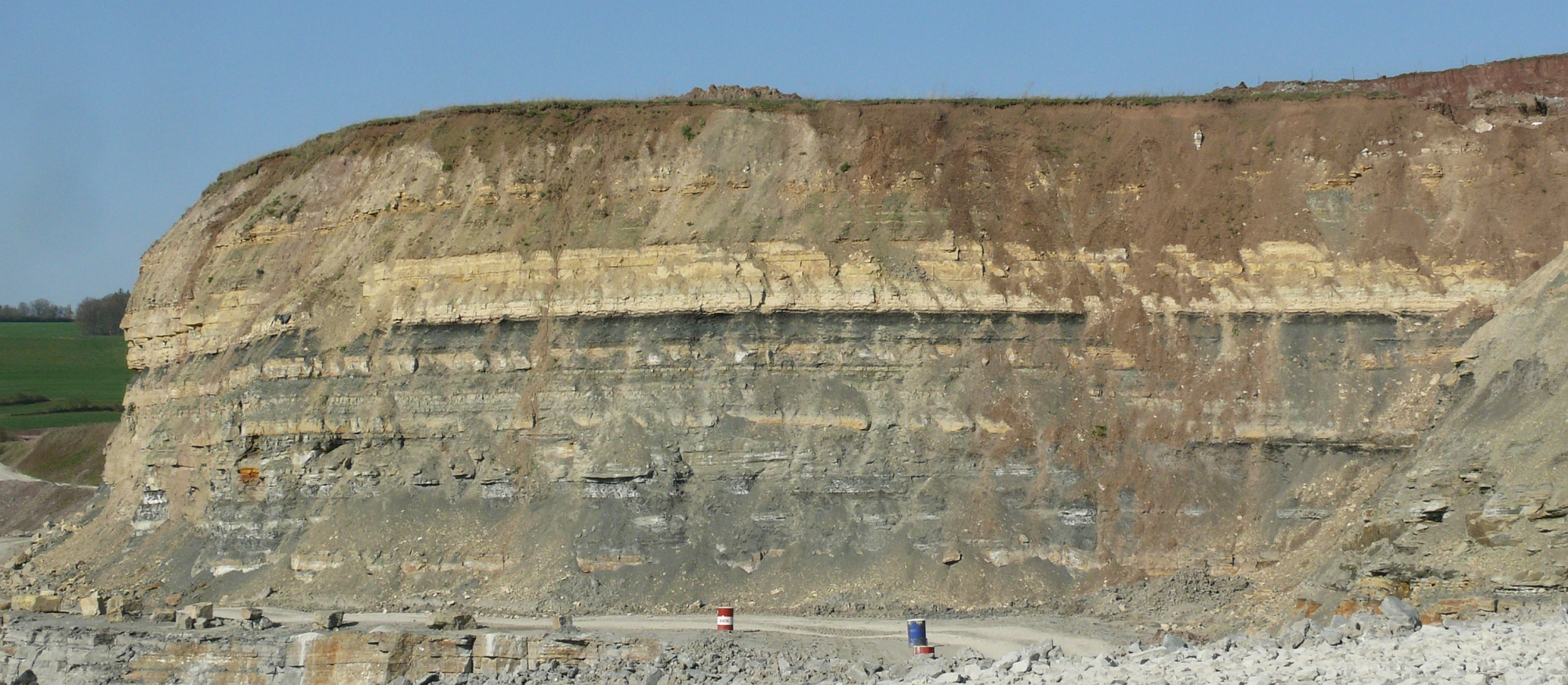
- Outcrop of the formation at the Schumann quarry near Vellberg
- Type: Geological formation
- Unit of: Lower Keuper
- Sub-units: Bairdienkalk, Grenzdolomit, Lettenkeuper, Sandige Pflanzenschiefer, Untere Graue Mergel & Werksandstein Members
- Underlies: Grabfeld Formation
- Overlies: Upper Muschelkalk
- Thickness: 20–700 m (66–2,297 ft)

Lithology
- Primary: Marl
- Other: Claystone, dolomite, limestone, sandstone

Location
- Coordinates: 50.949036°N 11.070136°E
- Approximate paleocoordinates: 15.1°N 16.6°E
- Region: Baden-Württemberg, Thuringia
- Country: Germany
- Extent: Mittelgebirge, North German Plain

Type section
- Named for: Erfurt
- Named by: Hoffmann
- Year defined: 1830
- Erfurt Formation (Germany)

Lithostratigraphy of the Keuper of the Germanic basin

The Erfurt Formation, also known as the Lower Keuper (German: Untere Keuper, Lettenkeuper, Lettenkohle or Lettenkohlenkeuper), is a stratigraphic formation of the Keuper group and the Germanic Trias supergroup. It was deposited during the Ladinian stage of the Triassic period. It lies above the Upper Muschelkalk and below the Middle Keuper.

== Definition ==
The formation was defined in Erfurt-Melchendorf in 1830 by Franz Xaver Hofmann and named for the nearby town of Erfurt.

The Erfurt Formation is underlain by the Upper Muschelkalk. The lower boundary to the Erfurt Formation is the "Lettenkohlensandstein" in northern Germany and the "Grenz-bone-beds" in southern Germany.

The formation is a sequence of dolomite, lacustrine limestones, claystone, evaporites, and fluviatile sandstones. The color is usually grey but can also be brown or reddish brown. The average thickness is 60 to 80 meter, with a maximum thickness of 700 meter in the Glückstadt-Graben.

The upper boundary is marked by dolomites, or claystones of the Grabfeld Formation.

== Fossil content ==
Color key: Taxon / Reclassified taxon / Taxon falsely reported as present / Dubious taxon or junior synonym / Ichnotaxon / Ootaxon / Morphotaxon	Notes; Uncertain or tentative taxa are in small text; ~~crossed out~~ taxa are discredited.

The Erfurt Formation is known for its vertebrate fossils. Different kinds of fish, amphibians and archosauriforms have been found. Usually they are found as bone beds, but in 1977 the first complete skeletons were found near Kupferzell. They include Mastodonsaurus, Gerrothorax, Plagiosuchus, Callistomordax, Nanogomphodon, Batrachotomus, Kupferzellia and Palaeoxyris friessi.

=== Reptiles ===
Reptiles reported from the Erfurt Formation
Genus	Species	Location	Stratigraphic position	Material	Notes	Images
Batrachotomus	B. kupferzellensis	Schwäbisch Hall.	Albertischichten Member (Serrolepisbank).		An archosaur.	
Wirtembergia	W. hauboldae	Vellberg.	Untere Graue Mergel.	2 partial dentaries (SMNS 91060 & SMNS 91061), and a partial skeleton (SMNS 91313).	One of the oldest and the most primitive known rhynchocephalian.	
Doswelliidae	Gen. et. sp. indet.	Schwäbisch Hall.	Albertischichten Member (Serrolepisbank).	An osteoderm (MHI 2078).	An archosauriform.	
Fraxinisaura	F. rozynekae	Vellberg, Baden-Württemberg.	Untere Graue Mergel Layer.		A basal lepidosauromorph.	
Jaxtasuchus	J. salomoni	Baden-Württemberg.	Estherienschichten to Anoplophora Dolomite.	Multiple skeletal remains.	A doswelliid.	
Nothosaurus	N. cristatus	Eschenau Quarry, Baden-Württemberg.	Lettenkeuper.	Almost complete skull lacking mandible (GPIT/RE/09800).	A nothosaur	
Nothosaurus	N. mirabilis	Hoheneck & Molsdorf.	Upper Lettenkeuper.	Multiple specimens.	A nothosaur.	
Nothosaurus	N. sp.	Schwäbisch Hall.	Albertischichten Member (Serrolepisbank).	2 dorsal vertebrae & a thoracic rib.	A nothosaur.	
Owenettidae, aff. Barasaurus		Kupferzell locality & Schumann quarry.		Left humerus (SMNS 92101) & right humerus (SMNS 92100).	An owenettid.	
Pappochelys	P. rosinae	Schumann Quarry, Eschenau, Vellberg.	Top of Untere Graue Mergel.	20 specimens.	A stem-turtle.	
Polymorphodon	P. adorfi	Schumann Quarry, Vellberg.	Untere Graue Mergel.	Disarticulated partial skeletons.	An archosauriform.	
Procolophonidae	Gen. indet. sp. indet.	Schumann Quarry.		Left humerus (SMNS 91753).	A procolophonid.	
Psephosaurus	P. suevicus	Quarry "Hohenloher Steinwerk" & Hoheneck near Ludwigsburg.		Isolated plates (MHI 1426/1-3 & SMNS 91007).	A placodont.	
Psephosaurus	P. sp.	Hoheneck near Ludwigsburg.		Isolated plates (SMNS 91008 & 91009).	A placodont.	
Rutiotomodon	R. tytthos	Schumann limestone quarry.	Top of the Untere Graue Mergel.	A nearly complete right maxilla with teeth (SMNS 97028) & a crushed dentary fragment (SMNS 97029).	A trilophosaurid.	
Simosaurus	S. gaillardoti	Hoheneck near Ludwigsburg.	Lettenkeuper.	Skull.	A nothosaur.	
Simosaurus	S. guilelmi	Hoheneck near Ludwigsburg.	Lettenkeuper.	Skull.	Junior synonym of S. gaillardoti.	
Smilodon	S. laevis	Gaildorf Alumn Mine.		Jaw fragment with teeth.	Preoccupied generic name, renamed Zanclodon laevis.	
?Suchia	Indeterminate	Schwäbisch Hall.	Albertischichten Member (Serrolepisbank).	A tooth (MHI 2035).	An archosaur.	
Tanystropheus	T. conspicuus			Vertebrae.	Nomen dubium.	
Tanystropheus	T. sp.	Steinbach near Crailsheim.	Lower Lettenkeuper.	Teeth & vertebrae.	A tanystropheid.	
Vellbergia	V. bartholomaei	Schumann Quarry, Vellberg.	Untere Graue Mergel.	Partial skull (SMNS 91590).	A stem-lepidosauromorph.	
Zanclodon	Z. laevis	Gaildorf Alumn Mine.		Jaw fragment with teeth.	An indeterminate archosaur.	

=== Synapsids ===
Synapsids reported from the Erfurt Formation
Genus	Species	Location	Stratigraphic position	Material	Notes	Images
Aff. Dinodontosaurus		Neidenfels, Baden-Württemberg.		Isolated complete left humerus (SMNS 56891).	Specimen now thought to represent a temnospondyl.	
Nanogomphodon	N. wildi	Michelbach an der Bilz.	Sandige Pflanzenschiefer Member, lower Lettenkeuper.	Teeth.	A cynodont.	

=== Amphibians ===
Amphibians reported from the Erfurt Formation
Genus	Species	Location	Stratigraphic position	Material	Notes	Images
Bystrowiella	B. schumanni	Kupferzell & Vellberg, Hohenlohe.	Untere Graue Mergel.	Osteoderms & vertebrae.	A chroniosuchian.	
Callistomordax	C. kugleri	Vellberg (Schumann quarry), Ummenhofen quarry & Kupferzell locality.	Albertibank through Untere Graue Mergel.	Numerous specimens.	A metoposauroid.	
Gerrothorax	G. pulcherrimus	Schwäbisch Hall.	Albertischichten Member (Serrolepisbank).	Two skull fragments and some osteoderms.	A plagiosaurid.	
Mastodonsaurus	M. giganteus	Many localities in Baden-Württemberg, Bayern & in Thuringia.	From the Grenzbonebed through the Hohenecker Kalk, covering nearly the whole Lettenkeuper sequence.	Numerous specimens.	A capitosaur.	
Megalophthalma	M. ockerti	Schumann limestone quarry, Vellberg, Baden-Württemberg, southern Germany.	Hauptsandstein (main sandstone unit).	A partial skull with anterior portion of the left mandibular ramus (MHI 2047).	A plagiosaurid.	
Plagiosuchus	P. pustuliferus	Multiple localities in Baden-Württemberg & Thuringia.	Vitriolschiefer, Sandige Pflanzenschiefer & Untere Graue Mergel.	Multiple specimens.	A plagiosaurid.	
?Temnospondyli	Gen. et. sp. indet.	Neidenfels & Schumann Quarry.	Untere Graue Mergel.	Isolated complete left humerus (SMNS 56891) & isolated almost complete right humerus (SMNS 90571).	Originally thought to represent a dicynodont similar to Dinodontosaurus.	
Trematolestes	T. hagdorni	Present in a range of localities in southern Germany.	Estherienschichten through Untere Graue Mergel, upper Lettenkeuper.	Numerous specimens including a nearly-complete skeleton.	A trematosaurid.	

=== Bony fish ===
Bony fish reported from the Erfurt Formation
Genus	Species	Location	Stratigraphic position	Material	Notes	Images
"Ceratodus"	"C." concinnus	Schwäbisch Hall.	Albertischichten Member (Serrolepisbank).	Tooth plates, pterygoids & scales.	A lungfish.	
?Coelacanthidae	Gen. et. sp. indet.	Schwäbisch Hall.	Albertischichten Member (Serrolepisbank).	Numerous remains.	A coelacanth.	
Parundichna	P. schoelli	Rot am See, Baden-Württemberg.	Hauptsandstein.	Clusters of sigmoidal scratches (MHI 1704).	Swimming trace of a large coelacanth.	
Ptychoceratodus	P. serratus	Schwäbisch Hall.	Albertischichten Member (Serrolepisbank).	A mould of a juvenile left praearticular tooth (MHI 410) & a fragment of a juvenile tooth plate (MHI 1748/42).	A lungfish.	
?Redfieldiiformes	Fam., gen. et. sp. indet.	Schwäbisch Hall.	Albertischichten Member (Serrolepisbank).	2 fragmentary and dissociated skeletons.	A redfieldiiform.	
Saurichthys	S. gypsophilus	Franconia.		Skull fragment.	A saurichthyiform.	
Saurichthys	S. sp.	Schwäbisch Hall.	Albertischichten Member (Serreolepisbank).	1 fragmentary rostrum (MHI 1748/27).	A saurichthyiform.	
Serrolepis	S. suevicus	Schwäbisch Hall.	Albertischichten Member (Serrolepisbank).	Numerous specimens.	A perleidiform.	

=== Cartilaginous fish ===
Cartilaginous fish reported from the Erfurt Formation
Genus	Species	Location	Stratigraphic position	Material	Notes	Images
Lonchidion	L. sp.	Schwäbisch Hall.	Albertischichten Member (Serrolepisbank).	Teeth.	A hybodontiform.	
Palaeoxyris	P. friessi	Muschelkalk quarry, Baden-Württemberg.	Top of Hauptsandstein.	SMNS 95447 (egg capsule).	Likely an egg capsule of Polyacrodus.	
