= Bukobaja =

Bukobaja Temporal range: Middle Triassic, Ladinian

Scientific classification
- Domain: Eukaryota
- Kingdom: Animalia
- Phylum: Chordata
- Order: †Temnospondyli
- Suborder: †Stereospondyli
- Clade: †Capitosauria
- Family: †Mastodonsauridae
- Genus: †Bukobaja; Ochev, 1966

Type species
- †Bukobaja enigmatica Ochev, 1966

Extinct genus of temnospondyls

Bukobaja is an extinct genus of mastodonsaurid temnospondyl from the middle Triassic of Russia. It contains a single species, Bukobaja enigmatica. Bukobaja mainly occurs in the Bukobay Svita as part of the Ladinian?-age "Mastodonsaurus fauna", a section of Russian Triassic biostratigraphy characterized by "Mastodonsaurus" torvus. It was also present in the underlying Donguz Svita ("Eryosuchus fauna"). Bukobaja appears to be a valid genus similar to, yet distinct from, Mastodonsaurus. Despite appearing to possess several unique features, Bukobaja is still known from very few remains. This has led to difficulties in determining its relations more precisely than "Mastodonsauridae incertae sedis". It has also been compared to trematosaurids.

== See also ==
- Prehistoric amphibian
- List of prehistoric amphibians
