= Malutinisuchus =

Malutinisuchus Temporal range: Middle Triassic

Scientific classification
- Domain: Eukaryota
- Kingdom: Animalia
- Phylum: Chordata
- Class: Reptilia
- Clade: Archosauromorpha
- Genus: †Malutinisuchus; Otschev, 1986

Species
- †M. gratus Otschev, 1986 (type)

Extinct genus of reptiles

Malutinisuchus is an extinct genus of Archosauromorph. The genus was named in 1986 with the description of the type species M. gratus. Malutinisuchus is known from Ladinian-age Middle Triassic deposits in the Bukobay and Rassypnaya localities in Orenburg Oblast, Russia. In Russia, deposits of this age are referred to the Bukobay Gorizont.
