= Energosuchus =

Energosuchus Temporal range: Middle Triassic

Scientific classification
- Domain: Eukaryota
- Kingdom: Animalia
- Phylum: Chordata
- Class: Reptilia
- Clade: Archosauria
- Clade: Pseudosuchia
- Family: †Rauisuchidae (?)
- Genus: †Energosuchus; Ochev, 1986
- Species: †E. garjainovi

Binomial name
- †Energosuchus garjainovi Ochev, 1986

Extinct genus of reptiles

Energosuchus (meaning "active crocodile" in Greek) is an extinct genus of rauisuchian. Fossils are present from the upper Karyomayol and lower Synya Formations outcropping along the banks of the Bolshaya Synya river in the Timan-North Urals region in northern European Russia, as well as from the Bukobay Formation in the southern part of Bashkortostan in the southern Urals of European Russia. Both localities date back to the Ladinian stage of the Middle Triassic.
