= Plagiobatrachus =

Plagiobatrachus Temporal range: Middle Triassic (Ladinian) 239 Ma

Scientific classification
- Kingdom: Animalia
- Phylum: Chordata
- Clade: Tetrapoda
- Order: †Temnospondyli
- Suborder: †Stereospondyli
- Family: †Plagiosauridae
- Genus: †Plagiobatrachus; Warren, 1985

Type species
- † Plagiobatrachus australis Warren, 1985

Extinct genus of amphibians

Plagiobatrachus is an extinct genus of plagiosaurid temnospondyl. It is known from The Crater locality (Ladinian) of the Arcadia Formation, an Triassic formation in Australia.

== History of study ==
Plagiobatrachus was described for vertebrae and partial mandibular material with pustular ornamentation for the type species, P. australis, by Anne Warren. This remains the only plagiosaurid known from Australia and one of the few records from the present-day southern hemisphere. It is also one of the few Early Triassic records of plagiosaurids. The vertebrae of plagiosaurids are fairly distinctive in having a single massive central element and neural arches that sit between successive centra (intercentral), allowing for the identification of the vertebral material as that of a plagiosaurid. However, the fragmentary nature of the material and the absence of any additional recovered material has limited the study of this taxon.

== See also ==
- Prehistoric amphibian
- List of prehistoric amphibians
