= Plagiorophus =

Plagiorophus Temporal range: Middle Triassic ~247–235 Ma

Scientific classification
- Domain: Eukaryota
- Kingdom: Animalia
- Phylum: Chordata
- Order: †Temnospondyli
- Suborder: †Stereospondyli
- Family: †Plagiosauridae
- Genus: †Plagiorophus; Konjukova, 1955

Species
- Plagiorophus danilovi Shishkin, 1986; Plagiorophus paraboliceps Konzhukova, 1955

Extinct genus of amphibians

Plagiorophus is an extinct genus of plagiosaurid temnospondyl amphibian. It is known from the Middle Triassic Bukobay Formation (Ladinian) and Donguz Formation (Anisian) of Russia.

== See also ==
- Prehistoric amphibian
- List of prehistoric amphibians
