= Serrolepis =

Serrolepis Temporal range: Ladinian

Scientific classification
- Kingdom: Animalia
- Phylum: Chordata
- Class: Actinopterygii
- Order: †Perleidiformes
- Family: †Polzbergiidae
- Genus: †Serrolepis; Quenstedt, 1885

Type species
- †Serrolepis suevicus Dames, 1888

An Extinct genus of fishes

Serrolepis is an extinct genus of prehistoric bony fish that lived during the Ladinian age of the Middle Triassic epoch in what is now Baden-Württemberg, Germany.

It was a highly specialized small stem-neopterygian with strong jaws and a short head. Body shape is variable and known material appears to fall within several size classes & two morphotypes. Fossils of Serrolepis are known from the Middle Triassic Erfurt Formation of Germany.

== See also ==
- Prehistoric fish
- List of prehistoric bony fish
