= Elephantosaurus =

Elephantosaurus Temporal range: Ladinian ~242–237 Ma

Scientific classification
- Kingdom: Animalia
- Phylum: Chordata
- Clade: Synapsida
- Clade: Therapsida
- Clade: †Anomodontia
- Clade: †Dicynodontia
- Clade: †Kannemeyeriiformes
- Genus: †Elephantosaurus; Vjuschkov, 1969

Type species
- Elephantosaurus jachimovitschi Vjuschkov, 1969

Extinct genus of dicynodonts

Elephantosaurus is an extinct genus of dicynodont from the Middle Triassic (Ladinian) Bukobay Formation. The holotype and only known specimen, catalogued as PIN 525/25, is a fragment of the skull that includes portions of the left interorbital region and nasal bones, and suggests a very large animal with a skull at least 30 centimetres (12 in) wide (although it may have been smaller than Stahleckeria). The bones of the skull roof are also unusually thick. While usually considered a member of the Stahleckeriidae, generally due to its size, it probably falls just outside the group due to its frontal bone contributing substantially to the margin of the eye socket.

== See also ==
- List of therapsids
