= Plagioscutum =

Plagioscutum Temporal range: Middle Triassic ~247–237 Ma

Scientific classification
- Domain: Eukaryota
- Kingdom: Animalia
- Phylum: Chordata
- Order: †Temnospondyli
- Suborder: †Stereospondyli
- Family: †Plagiosauridae
- Genus: †Plagioscutum

Extinct genus of amphibians

Plagioscutum is an extinct genus of Middle Triassic temnospondyl amphibian from the Ladinian Inder Formation of Kazakhstan and the Anisian Donguz Formation of Russia.

== See also ==
- Prehistoric amphibian
- List of prehistoric amphibians
