= Donguz (river) =

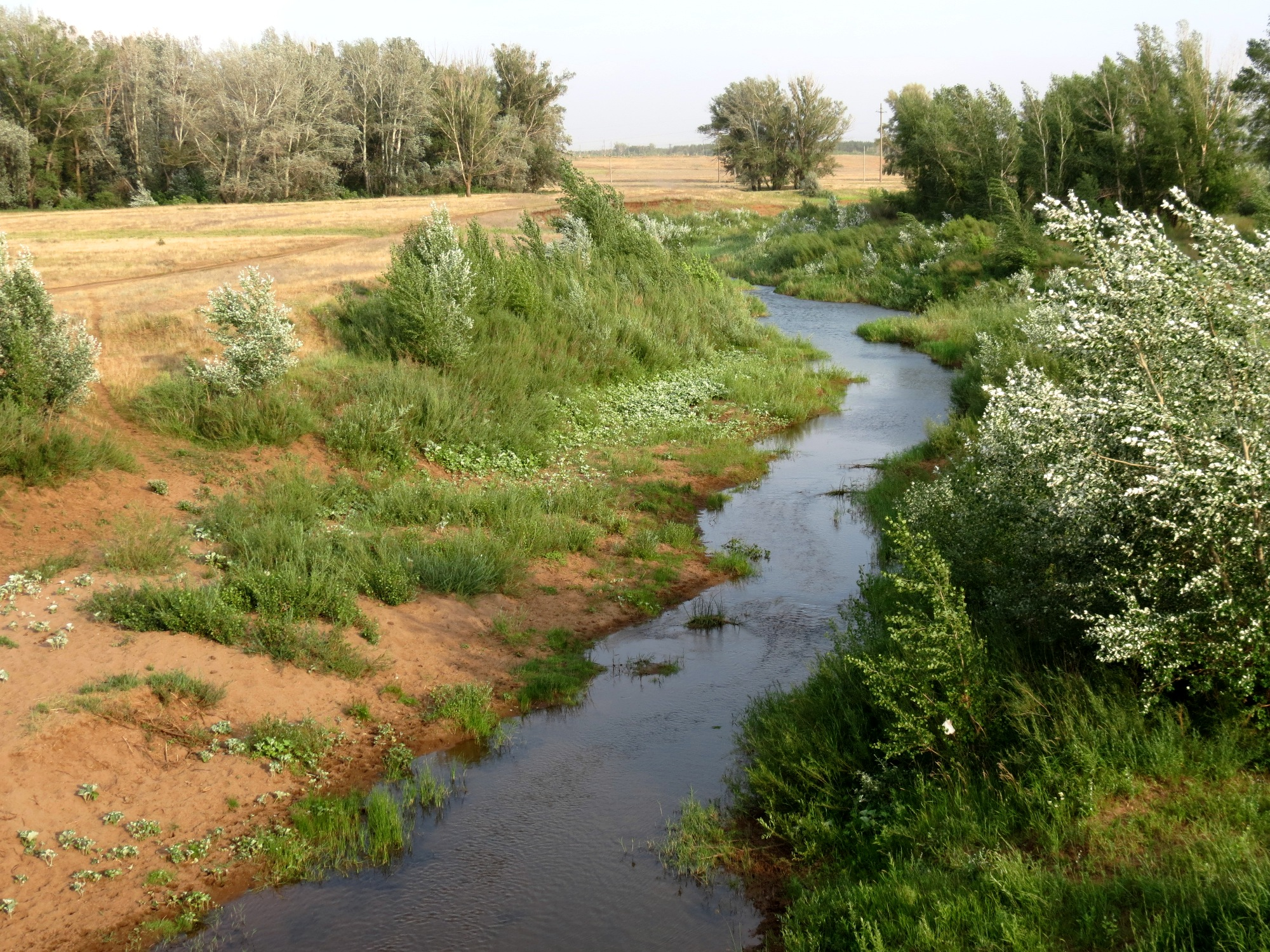

Location
- Country: Russia

Physical characteristics
- Mouth: Ural
  - coordinates: 51.7401°N 54.7576°E
- Length: 95 km (59 mi)
- Basin size: 1,240 km^{2} (480 sq mi)

Basin features
- Progression: Ural→ Caspian Sea

The Donguz (Russian: Донгуз) is a river in Orenburg Oblast, Russia, a left tributary of the Ural River. It is 95 kilometres (59 mi) long, and has a drainage basin of 1,240 square kilometres (480 sq mi).

The settlement of Pervomaysky and the Donguz test site are by the river.

The outcrops on the banks of the river (Donguz Formation) are of interest for palaeontology, and a number of discoveries have been made there.
