= Jushatyria =

Jushatyria Temporal range: Middle Triassic, 247–242 Ma

Scientific classification
- Kingdom: Animalia
- Phylum: Chordata
- Class: Reptilia
- Clade: Archosauria
- Genus: †Jushatyria; Sennikov, 1985

Type species
- †Jushatyria vjushkovi Sennikov, 1985

Extinct genus of reptiles

Jushatyria is an extinct genus of archosaur. Fossils have been found in the Koltaevo III Locality, district of Kumertau near the Ural Mountains in European Russia from the Bukobay Gorizont. The locality dates back to the Ladinian stage of the Middle Triassic. Additional material has been described from a locality on the banks of the Berdyanka River that was previously assigned to a rauisuchid-like archosaur. However, this material differed from the original specimens because it lacked slit-like antorbital openings accompanying the antorbital fossa. Nesbitt (2009) and Gower and Sennikov (2000) suggested that all material currently referred to Jushatyria most likely does not represent a single taxon. Thus, Jushatyria is known only from its holotype PIN 2867/5, an incomplete left maxilla. As the maxilla is damaged, many "rauisuchian" characters could not be verified. Jushatyria was reassigned as an indeterminate archosaur on the basis of the presence of an antorbital fossa on the lateral surface of the maxilla.
