= Center 2015 =

Russian military exercise

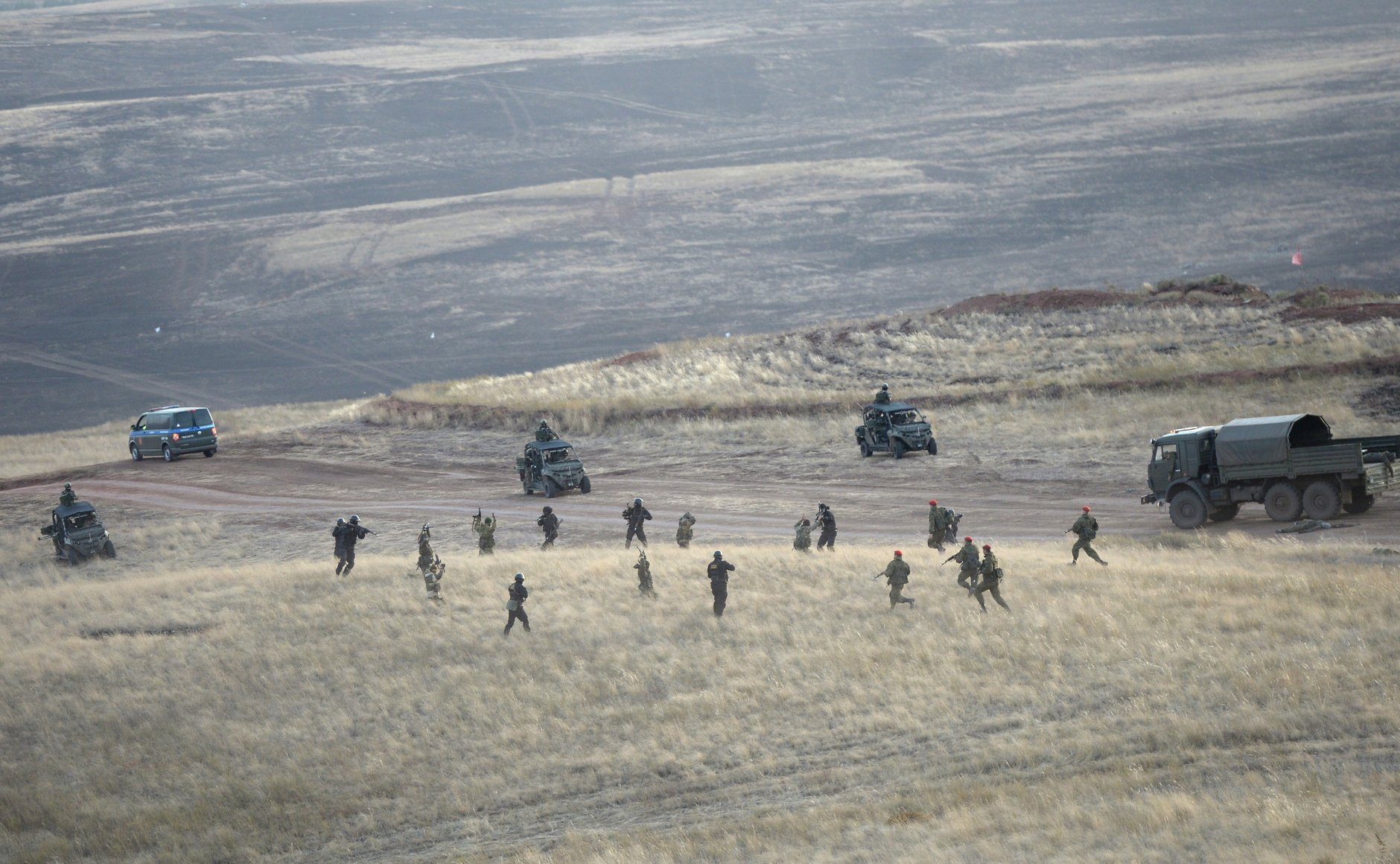
Center 2015 exercise, Donguz test site

Center 2015 (Russian: Центр-2015, Tsentr 2015) was a military exercise in Russia in 2015. Full name: Стратегическое командно-штабное учение "Центр-2015" (Stratefic Command and Staff Exercise "Tsentr-2015"). It was held in the Central Military District at the Donguz test site and Totsky range in steppes of the Orenburg Oblast. It involved 95,000 personnel, 170 planes and 20 ships.

== See also ==
- List of Center exercises
