= Calleonasus =

Scientific classification
- Kingdom: Animalia
- Phylum: Chordata
- Clade: Synapsida
- Clade: Therapsida
- Clade: †Anomodontia
- Clade: †Dicynodontia
- Family: †Dicynodontidae
- Subfamily: †Kannemeyeriinae
- Genus: †Calleonasus; Kalandadze, 1985

Extinct genus of dicynodonts

Calleonasus is an extinct genus of non-mammalian synapsid from the Anisian Donguz Formation of Russia discovered by synapsid paleontologist Nikolay Kalandadze.

== See also ==
- List of therapsids
