= San Cassiano Formation =

Geologic formation in Italy

- Stratigraphic range: Anisian-Carnian
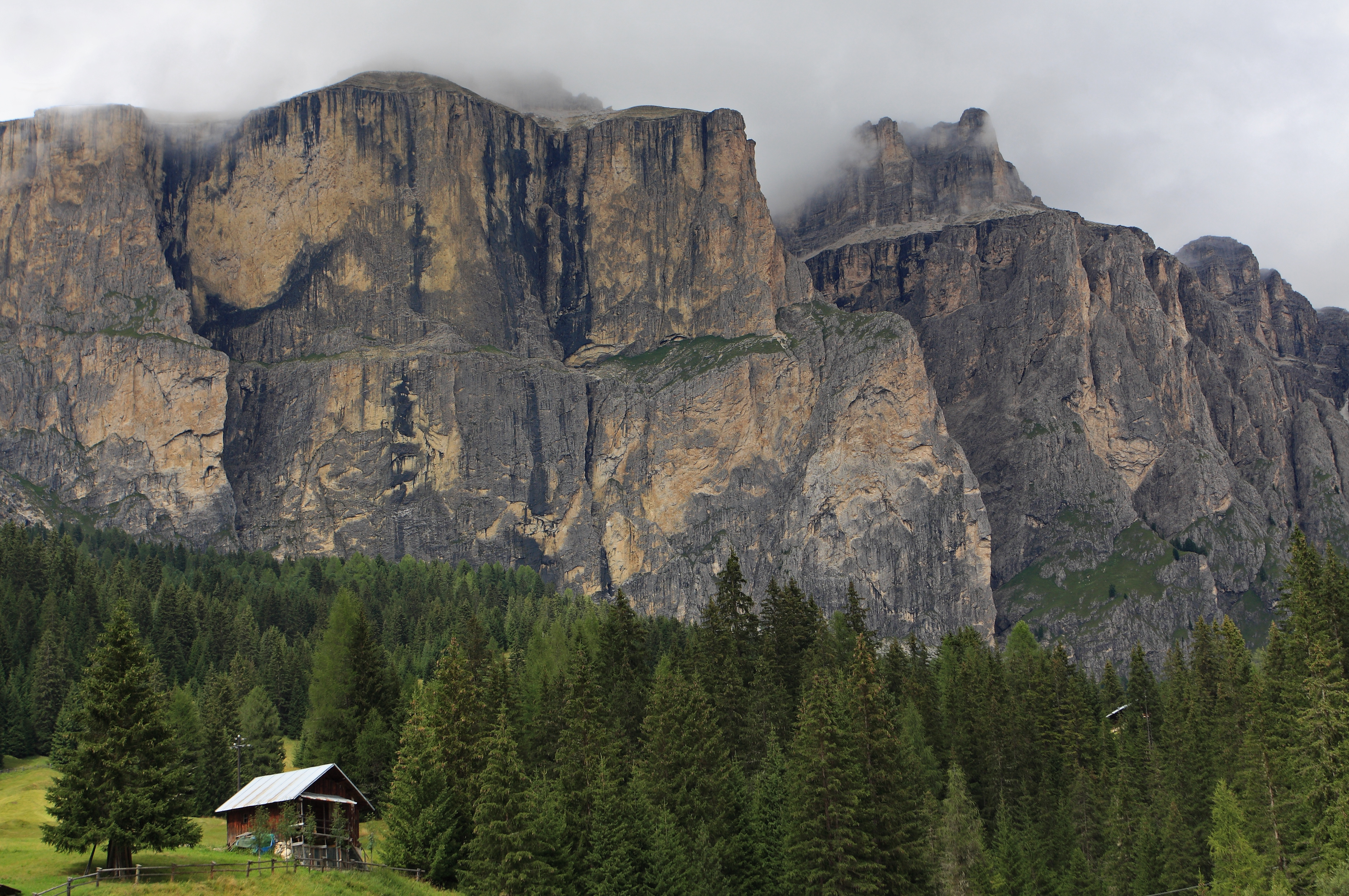
- The Dolomites, mountain chain in which the San Cassiano Formation is located

Lithology
- Primary: Dolomite

Location
- Location: Northeast Italy

San Cassiano Formation (Anisian-Carnian) is a geologic formation located on the Southern Alps (Northeast Italy) in the Dolomites. These Triassic dolomites are considered to be a classic example of ancient carbonate platforms. As the allochthonous elements in the Shale strata (Cipit boulders) show a good preservation, fossils and microbialites contained in these elements are useful in detailed geochemical analyses.

== History ==
Research on the San Cassiano Formation started in the 19th century with the works of Nicolas de Saussure and the stratigraphic works of Leopold von Buch and Alexander von Humboldt. By the late 19th century Richthofen and von Mojsisovics had already acknowledge the reefal origin of these mountains.

== Geological background ==
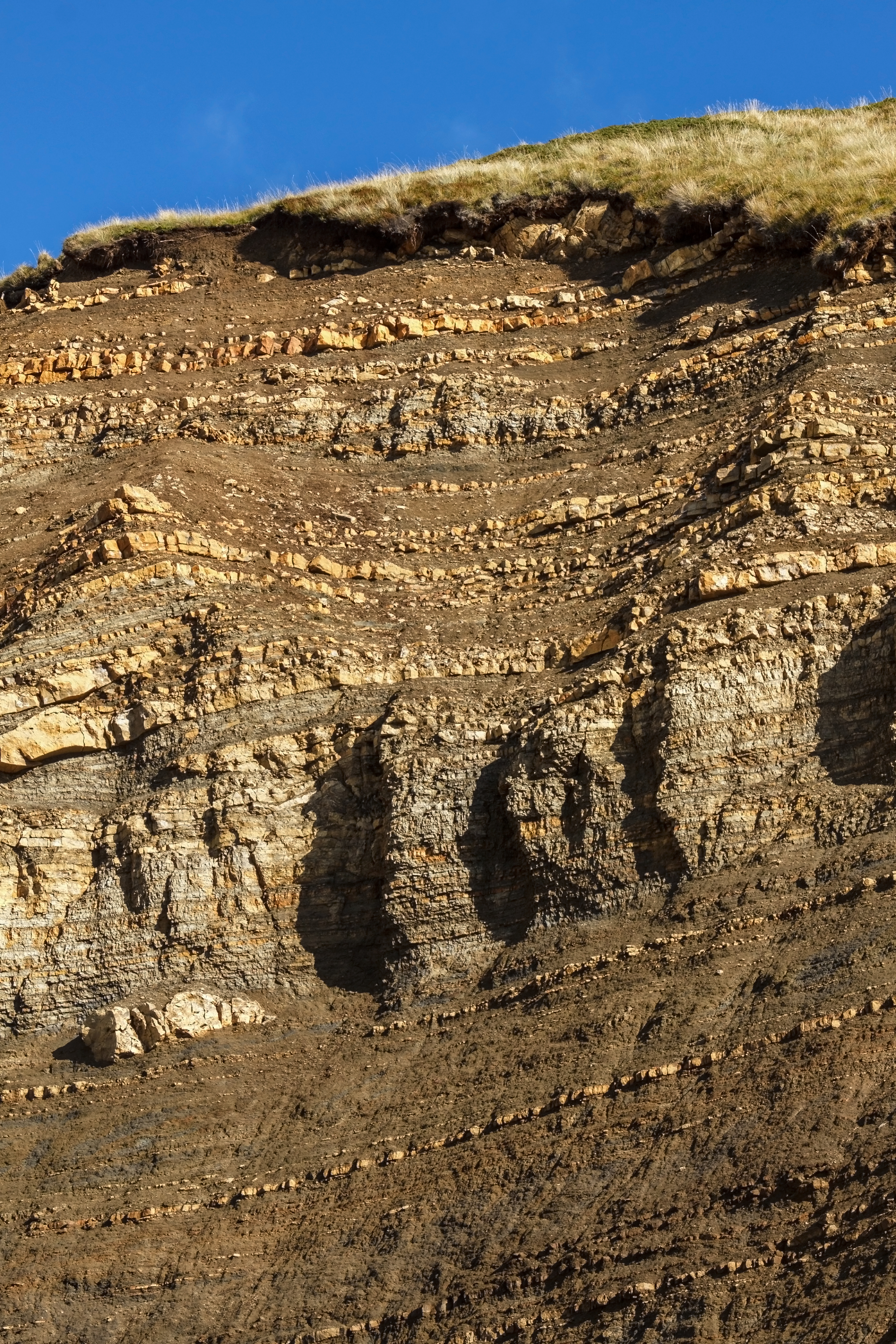
Outcrop of the San Cassiano Formation at the Hotel Mariaflora at the Sella Pass

The landscape of the Dolomites is dominated by Triassic carbonates, deposited from the Anisian to the Carnian. In the Lower Carnian (Julian) the percentages of carbonates increments due to the diminishing eustatic sea-level change. The last part of the reefal evolution is the development of patch reefs constituted by colonial corals (Scleractinia). Large areas of the reefs of the Dolomites suffered karstic erosion due to sea regression in the Anisian. A new transgression in the Carnian permitted new carbonate platforms to develop in swallow basins.

== Stratigraphy ==
The San Cassiano Formation overlays the Wengen Formation (a volcanic flysch sequence); the limit between this two formations is arbitrary; usually considered as the first carbonate strata in the volcaniclastic sequence. The San Cassiano Formation shows a variable thickness from 300 m to 500 m; it was described by Ogilvie in 1893, and it has two Members. The Inferior Member is constituted by an intercalated sequence of shale, limestone, volcaniclast (pseudoflysch) and marl; deposited from the Late Ladinian (Mid Triassic) to Early Carnian (Superior Triassic). The Superior Member is a sequence of pseudoflysch, marl, limestone and mudrock (in this strata some Cipit Boulders occur). This sequence was deposited from during the Middle Carnian.

The strata are very similar in both members; they are divided by biostratigraphic criteria based in the aon zone (Inferior Member) and aonoides and austracum zones (Superior Member). Dürrenstein Dolomite (a massive dolomite unit) overlies the San Cassiano Formation.

== Paleoenvironment ==
In the 20th century the research in San Cassiano Formation was mostly focused in the study of facies analysis. The paleoenvironments represented in San Cassiano Formation are as follows: Reefal environments consisting of patch reefs; shallow marginal basin; carbonate platform; continental slope; and deep basin.

== Facies ==
The facies identified in San Cassiano Formation:

- 1. Volcaniclastic sandstones with cross bedding and clastic turbidites (pseudoflysch)
- 2. (a) Patch reefs with 10 m to 20 m in length and 10 m of thickness, generally with significant diagenetic alteration

(b) Sequences of intercalated sediments influenced by volcanic activity and near carbonate platforms. Fossiliferour limestones, fossiliferous marl alternated with dismicrits, algal mats, oolit banks, fine to coarse grain size sandstones with cross bedding
(c) Cyclic tidalites, massive dolomites, laminated algal mats, reworked ooliths

- 3. (a) Dolomitic massive carbonates presenting evidence of karstification (solution cavities, residual sediments and limonite crusts)

(b) Stratified marine debris

- 4. (Muds or carbonate sediments interrupted by volcanic or carbonate turbidites)

(a) Cipit Boulders consisting mostly of algal biolites, corals, pellets and micrites (microbialites)
(b) Clay sediments with stratified oolites, oncolites, tuffites, turbidites and calcarenites with abundant gastropod and bivalve shells
(c) Tuffites up to 300 m in thickness with sorted strata of calcirudites, calcarenites and Cipit Boulders. Most of the faunal elements are allochthonous
(d) Mudrock and limestone with fine bedding, intercalated with fine grain turbidite and sporadic calcarenite turbidites

These facies are interpreted as the next deposit environments:

- 1. Volcanic islands and formations
- 2. Reefal environment near to cost line:

(a) patch reefs
(b) A sequence of variable sediments intercalates with patch reefs
(c) Back reef area of the carbonate platform

- 3. Carbonate platform
- 4. Basin:

(a) Cipit Boulders
(b) Marginal shallow basin
(c) continental slope (300 m)
(d) deep basin

== Biota ==
The Patch reefs from Valle di Rimbianco present a diverse fauna of fossilized calcitic sponges (Porifera), corals (Cnidaria), bivalves and gastropods (Mollusca), Brachiopoda and Echinodermata. Large parts of the basin are not fossiliferous. In the deep basin and continental slope facies the fauna consists only of ammonites and pseudoplanktonic bivalves, beside of allochthonous elements eroded from the carbonate platform (Cipit Boulders).

== Geochemistry ==
The facies that present less diagenetic alteration are the Cipit Boulders. The microbialites contained in these elements show a very good preservation and therefore are very useful as geochemical proxies to determine paleoenvironmental conditions of the carbonate platform. The carbonate platform itself suffered intense karstification and dolomitization, because of these alterations the fossils in this facies cannot be used in geochemical analysis.
