= Wengen Formation =

- Stratigraphic range: Ladinian
- Type: Formation

Lithology
- Primary: Mudstone

Location
- Country: Italy

The Wengen Formation (Italian: Formazione di Wengen) is a lithostratigraphic formation of the Middle Triassic Ladinian in the Southern European Alps. It is named after Wengen in South Tyrol.

== History ==
The term “Wengen Strata” was first used in 1841 by H.L. Wissmann to describe a terrigenous-carbonate interval ranging in color from dark gray to black. It was described in greater detail in 1879 by Johann August Edmund Mojsisovics von Mojsvár.

The Wengen formation underlies the Dolomites, e.g. here below Grohmannspitze in the Langkofel group. The San Cassiano Formation overlying and at times interbedded with the Wengen Formation can be seen in the picture where the meadow has given way.

== Definition and Area ==
The Wengen Formation is underlain by Ladinian volcanic rocks and the Marmolada Conglomerate. The Marmolada Conglomerate, which can reach a thickness of up to 1,000 meters, formed primarily in the vicinity of volcanic activity centers. This conglomerate is inconsistently classified: it is either assigned to the Wengen Formation, as in the description by the Commissione Italiana di Stratigrafia, or identified as a separate formation, as in the 1:25,000 Geological Map of the Western Dolomites. Laterally, the Wengen Formation is interbedded with the Rosszähne Formation and Marmolada conglomerates. The Wengen Formation may also be interbedded with the San Cassiano Formation. The formation is up to 400 meters thick.

== Description ==
The formation consists of alternating layers of volcaniclastic sandstones, clays, and marls. There are repeated intercalations of beds composed of reef detritus. In addition, the Wengen formation contains so called Cipit blocks (named after the Tschapit creek below Schlern), carbonate blocks that fell off the reef onto the adjacent seafloor where they got buried in the muds making up the Wengen formation. Unlike their parent reef counterparts that now make up the Dolomites, these carbonate blocks were sheltered from dolimitization and now provide exceptional conditions for fossil and geochemical analysis.

== See also ==
- Wengener Schichten Formation, a corresponding formation in Montenegro
