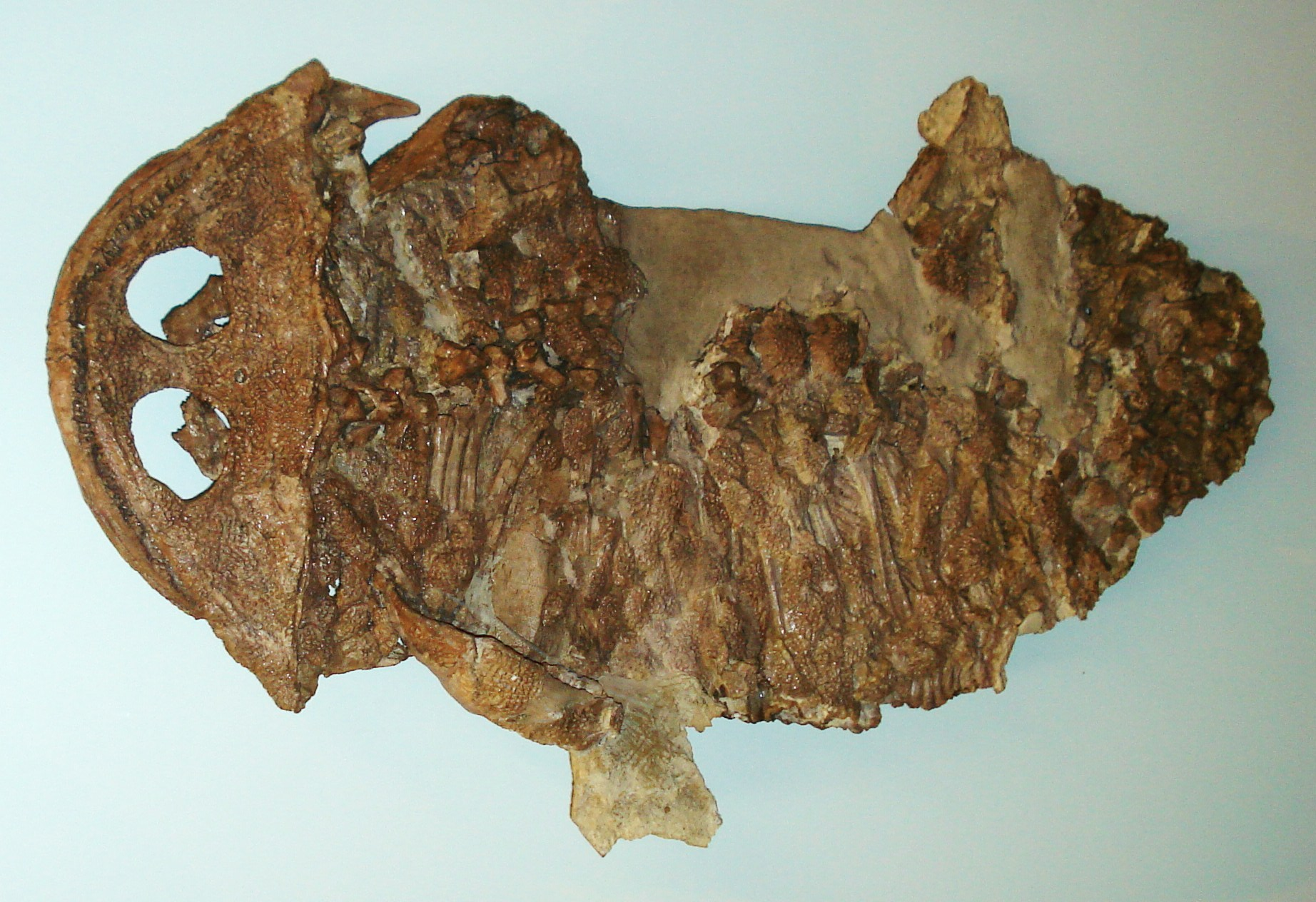
- Fossil of G. pulcherrimus in the Naturmuseum Senckenberg

Scientific classification
- Kingdom: Animalia
- Phylum: Chordata
- Clade: Tetrapoda
- Order: †Temnospondyli
- Suborder: †Stereospondyli
- Family: †Plagiosauridae
- Genus: †Gerrothorax; Nilsson, 1934

Type species
- †Gerrothorax pulcherrimus Nilsson, 1934

Other species
- †Gerrothorax maritimus Diao et al., 2026

= Gerrothorax =

Gerrothorax Temporal range: Middle–Late Triassic, Ladinian–Rhaetian

Extinct genus of amphibians

Gerrothorax ("wicker chest") is an extinct genus of temnospondyl amphibian known from the Triassic period. The type species, Gerrothorax pulcherrimus, is known from Greenland, Germany, Poland, Sweden, and possibly Thailand. Some other species, such as G. pustuloglomeratus, have been named in the past but have since been synonymized with G. pulcherrimus. An additional species, Gerrothorax maritimus, was named in 2026 based on two well-preserved specimens found in the Upper Triassic Xiaowa Formation(=Wayao Member of the Falang Formation), China. This species has been interpreted as having a fully marine ecology.

== Description ==
Gerrothorax was about 1 metre (3.3 ft) long, and had a remarkably flattened body. It probably hid under sand or mud on river and lake bottoms, and in brackish waters, scanning for prey with its large, upward-facing eyes. Gerrothorax had an unusually shaped skull with angular protrusions on the sides. This looked vaguely similar to the skull of the earlier, unrelated, amphibian Diplocaulus, but was not so developed. In 2011 the skull of Gerrothorax was scanned using microtomography, revealing that the braincase and palatoquadrate regions are highly ossified.

Some Gerrothorax fossils preserved hypobranchials and ceratobranchials (bony gill arches) near the neck. This shows that Gerrothorax was pedomorphic, retaining its larval gills as an adult. When originally described in 1946, these bones were considered to correspond to feather-like external gills similar to those of modern-day neotenic salamanders, such as the mudpuppy, the axolotl, and the olm.

However, a 2011 paper found that it was more likely that plagiosaurids such as Gerrothorax had internal gills, like those of fish, rather than salamander-like external gills. The authors of that study noted that plagiosaurids and other ancient amphibians which retained gills as adults had grooves on their ceratobranchials. Grooved ceratobranchials are present in both modern and ancient fish, but unknown in modern amphibians. Therefore, they were indicative of internal gills. This would have also been advantageous for survival in large animals, as internal gills would have been protected by a large skin fold and were less likely to have been damaged by the environment.

== Palaeobiology ==
=== Diet ===
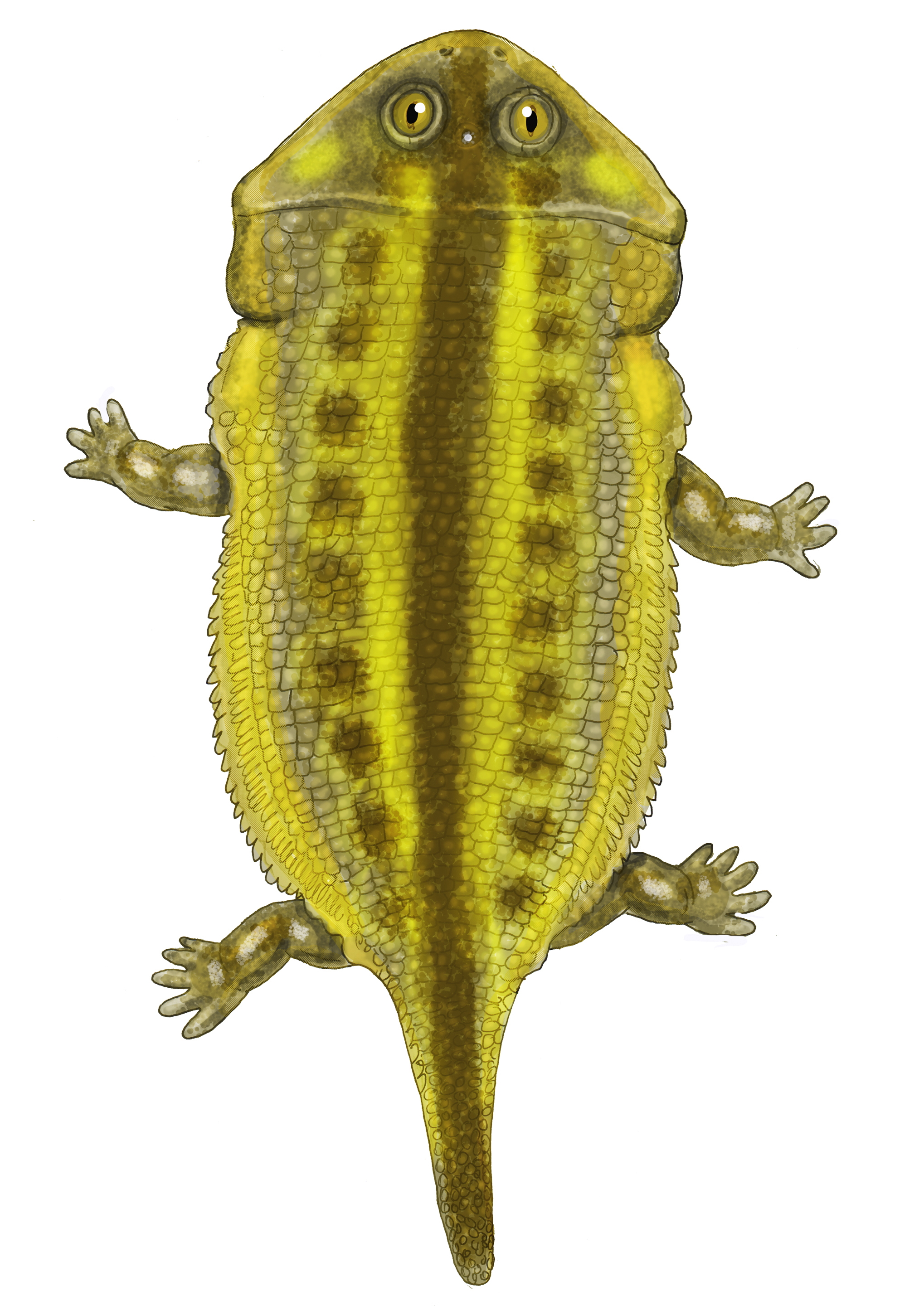
Life restoration of G. pulcherrimus

A 2008 study showed that Gerrothorax lifted its head rather than dropping its jaw when catching prey, which has been compared to how a toilet seat opens. A 2013 study argued that Gerrothorax consumed prey using suction feeding. Gerrothorax had strong muscles capable of both raising the cranium and lowering the jaw rapidly. The robust internal gill apparatus would have expelled water through the gills during this motion, creating intense pressure in the throat that would suck in small prey items. The gill arches were also covered in small denticles, prohibiting any prey from escaping once devoured. Although suction feeding is common in fish and modern larval amphibians, Gerrothorax differs from these animals by its lack of cranial kinesis, meaning that its cranial bones had fused joints and could not flex against each other to create more negative space or to envelop prey.

=== Life history ===
Osteohistological analysis has shown that Gerrothorax was extremely developmentally and metabolically plastic, having extremely wide norms of reaction that enabled it to live in an extreme diversity of environmental conditions.

=== Evolutionary stasis ===
The fossil record of Gerrothorax pulcherrimus extends 35 million years from the Ladinian stage of the Middle Triassic to the Rhaetian stage of the Late Triassic. Throughout this time span, specimens of the species show few morphologic differences, making G. pulcherrimus an extreme example of evolutionary stasis. G. pulcherrimus may have remained unchanged for so long because it could tolerate a wide range of ecological conditions. Although it always needed to live in an aquatic habitat, G. pulcherrimus may have been able to live in a variety of different water bodies with a wide range of salinity. Its extremely variable life history has been cited as the reason for the species remaining in evolutionary stasis for so long.
