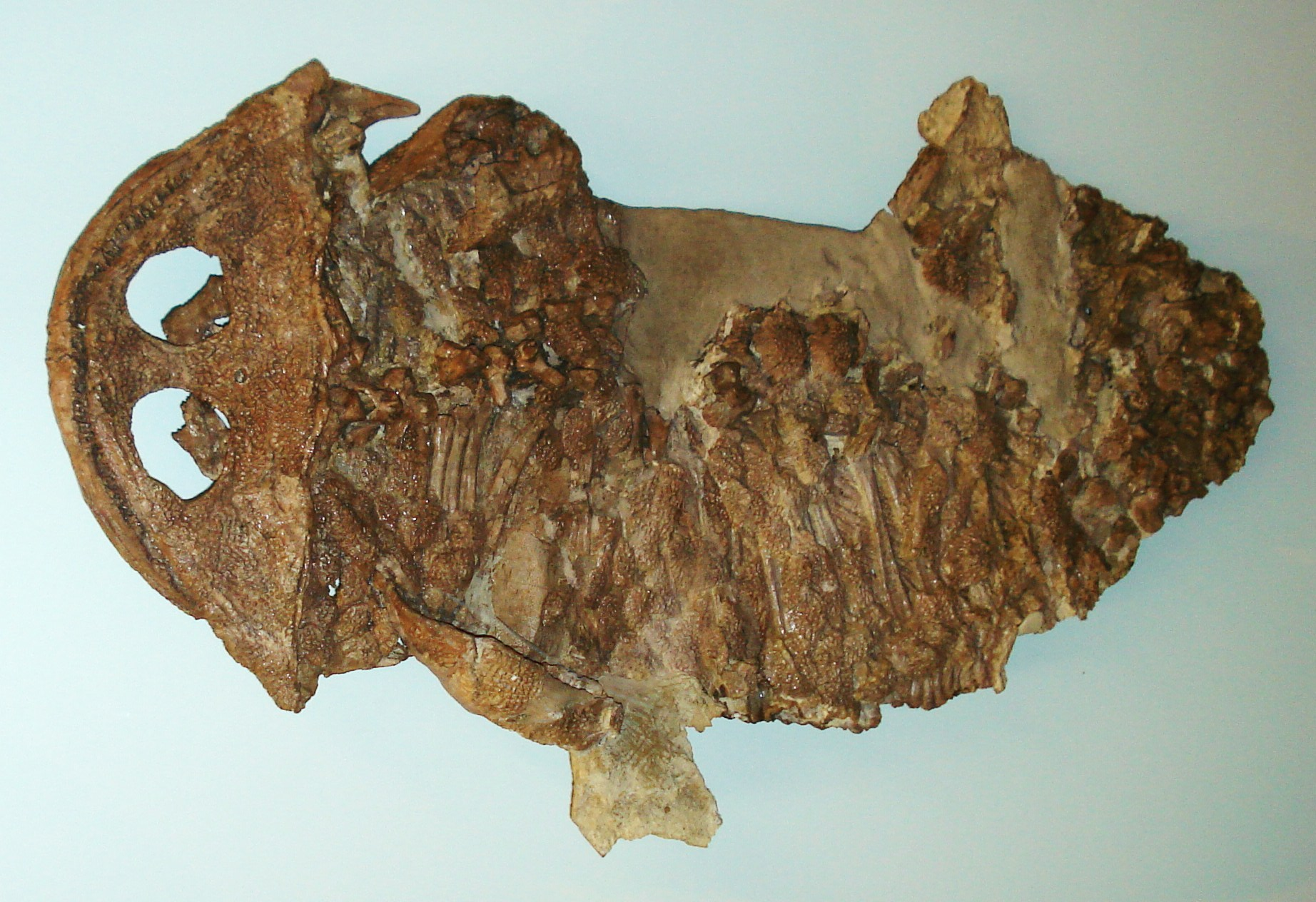
- Fossil of Gerrothorax pustuloglomeratus

Scientific classification
- Kingdom: Animalia
- Phylum: Chordata
- Clade: Tetrapoda
- Order: †Temnospondyli
- Suborder: †Stereospondyli
- Superfamily: †Plagiosauroidea
- Family: †Plagiosauridae; Abel, 1919

Genera
- †Arctobatrachus; †Capulomala; †Gerrothorax; †Megalophthalma; †Plagiobatrachus; †Plagiorophus; †Plagiosaurus; †Plagioscutum; †Plagiosternum

= Plagiosauridae =

Plagiosauridae Temporal range: Triassic

Extinct family of temnospondyls

Plagiosauridae is a clade of temnospondyls known from the Early to Late Triassic. Deposits of the group are most commonly found in non-marine aquatic depositional environments from central Europe and Greenland, but other remains have been found in Russia, Scandinavia, Australia, and possibly Thailand.

== Material ==
The majority of plagiosaurid remains are of the genus Gerrothorax, which have been recovered from the Fleming Fjord Formation of Jameson Land, East Greenland, and from many localities in southern Germany. All of this material is currently assigned to a single species, G. pulcherrimus. Plagiosuchus material is also very abundant, though poorly preserved and has been found only from Germany. Additional material, including the material of all other plagiosaurids, is significantly more fragmentary and less abundant than that of Gerrothorax. These additional materials are predominantly from Germany and Russia with some potential material also reported from Thailand and Brazil.

== Description ==
Plagiosaurids are predominantly characterized by the unique structure of their skulls and the armor that lines their trunk. The heads of these animals are short and wide with an overall semi-circular layout and extremely large orbital fenestrae. The skull and trunk of these organisms are generally vertically compressed to varying degrees within members of the clade to form an overall flattened body plan. Some articulated, three-dimensional preservation of plagiosaurids indicates that this flattening was a feature of the animals in life and is not a preservation artifact (the animals were not flattened by fossilization). The amount of vertical compression ("flattening") in plagiosaurids varies somewhat, with the most basal member, Plagiosuchus, being only somewhat compressed while more derived members such as Gerrothorax and Megalophthalma are much more significantly compressed. Their skull, also vertically compressed, has dorsally oriented large orbital fenestrae and contained a battery of small teeth that curve inward. The trunks of these animals have shortened limbs relative to their body size, and the backs were generally covered in bony armor which is denser in the more derived members of the clade.

== Ecology ==
Plagiosaurids are believed to have lived an almost entirely aquatic lifestyle. Much of this interpretation stems from analysis of the remains of Gerrothorax because specimens of this group are so much more abundant and well preserved than other plagiosaurid remains. Aside from their remains being found dominantly within aquatic settings, evidence for an aquatic lifestyle comes primarily from evidence that the clade possessed internal gills, given by the presence of branchial arches that were lined with arteries. Additionally, the limbs of plagiosaurids are short relative to their body size and the size of their pectoral girdle. Coupled with their vertically compressed body plan, a popular interpretation for these organisms has been that they lived on the floor of freshwater systems and were obligatorily aquatic. To facilitate a bottom dwelling lifestyle these organisms possess a special jaw joint, the atlanto-occipital joint, which facilitates the lifting of the cranium to open the mouth rather than lowering the jaw as would be expected in other organisms. Consequently, it is presumed that the animal would lay flat on river or lake beds waiting in ambush to catch prey, such as fish. It has been proposed that they may have captured prey via suction by rapidly opening their mouth and then clamping down with their curved teeth. This is somewhat supported by the lateral elongation of the skull in later plagiosaurids like Gerrothorax and Plagiosternum compared to earlier members such as Plagiosuchus. The elongation of the skull is interpreted to have facilitated muscle attachment to the back of the skull and increasing the ability and force directed toward lifting the head.

The large orbits of plagiosaurids have only been extensively analyzed in a single study (Schoch et al., 2014), which put forth two plausible eye structures. According to this study, because of their incredibly flat and vertically compressed skulls, it is unlikely that the eyes actually filled the space of the large orbits because these hypothetically large eyes would permanently protrude into at least part of the palate. Thus, it is most plausible that, like many modern amphibians, the eyes of these animals were actually significantly smaller than the orbit and positioned toward the front of the skull, though there is not enough data to make a conclusive judgment about their exact position. The alternate hypothesis is that the group had large, flat, lensless eyes similar to a family of deep sea teleost fish, the Ipnopidae (especially the type genus, Ipnops). These lensless eyes would allow plagiosaurids to detect when something is moving directly above them by causing a shadow in the light detected by the retina. While not observed among modern amphibians today, this hypothesis does align with the interpreted life habit of plagiosaurids and helps to explain the abnormal space afforded to the orbits of these animals.

Plagiosaurids also represent an interesting case of extreme evolutionary and morphological stasis. The features of these animals change very little through their evolutionary history despite changes. Schoch and Witzmann analyzed the collections of Gerrothorax material and noted that, despite being recovered from multiple environments that encompass approximately 40 million years of time, the general body plan of Gerrothorax was relatively static. This was interpreted to support a relatively high degree of biological flexibility in these animals despite their unique morphology.
