= Donguz explosion =

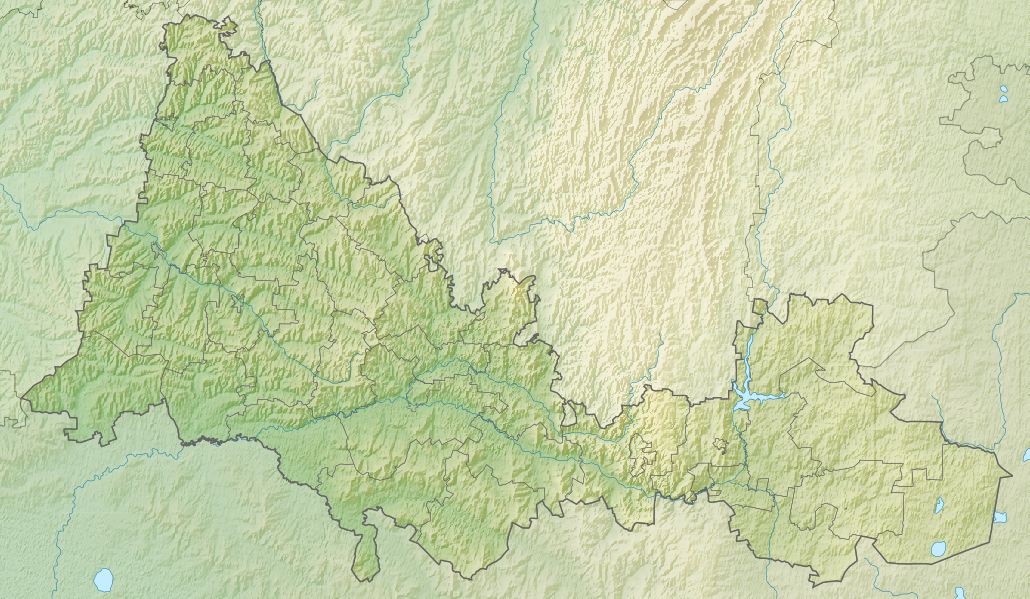
Donguz test site
Donguz explosion (European Russia)
Donguz explosion (Russia)

The Donguz explosion was an incident at the Donguz test site, in 2012, when more than 4000 tonnes of ammunition delivered for disposal blew up.

Some sources reported three separate blasts. Bombs, artillery shells, and Uragan missiles were involved. The ammunition was on a train, or had just been unloaded, in the arms depot.

Initially, emergency services said that the explosions were caused by somebody smoking, and that one person was injured, and many nearby homes damaged. Defence officials said that the ammunition blew up spontaneously and that no homes were damaged. The Emergencies Ministry said the explosion was caused by burning packaging.

Emergency services attempted to evacuate local people, but most refused: "The residents were more afraid of looters than the explosions."

The incident happened only two weeks after the head of a local munitions-disposal team was killed.
