= Dongusia =

Dongusia Temporal range: Middle Triassic, 237 Ma

Scientific classification
- Kingdom: Animalia
- Phylum: Chordata
- Class: Reptilia
- Clade: Pseudosuchia
- Clade: Suchia
- Clade: Paracrocodylomorpha
- Clade: Loricata
- Family: †Rauisuchidae
- Genus: †Dongusia; Huene, 1940

Species
- †D. colorata Huene, 1940 (type)

Extinct genus of reptiles

Dongusia is an extinct genus of rauisuchid reptile from the Middle Triassic of Russia. The type species D. colorata was named by German paleontologist Friedrich von Huene in 1940 on the basis of a single vertebra. This bone was found in the Sol-Iletsky District of Orenburg Oblast. Huene thought Dongusia was a primitive archosauriform. In the 1960s, D. colorata was included in the early archosauriform genus Erythrosuchus. In 1970, similarities were noted between the Dongusia vertebra and those of the rauisuchid "Mandasuchus" from Tanzania. The vertebra is now thought to belong to a rauisuchid, but the genus Dongusia is considered a nomen dubium because there are no diagnostic features in the single bone that distinguish it from other rauisuchids.
