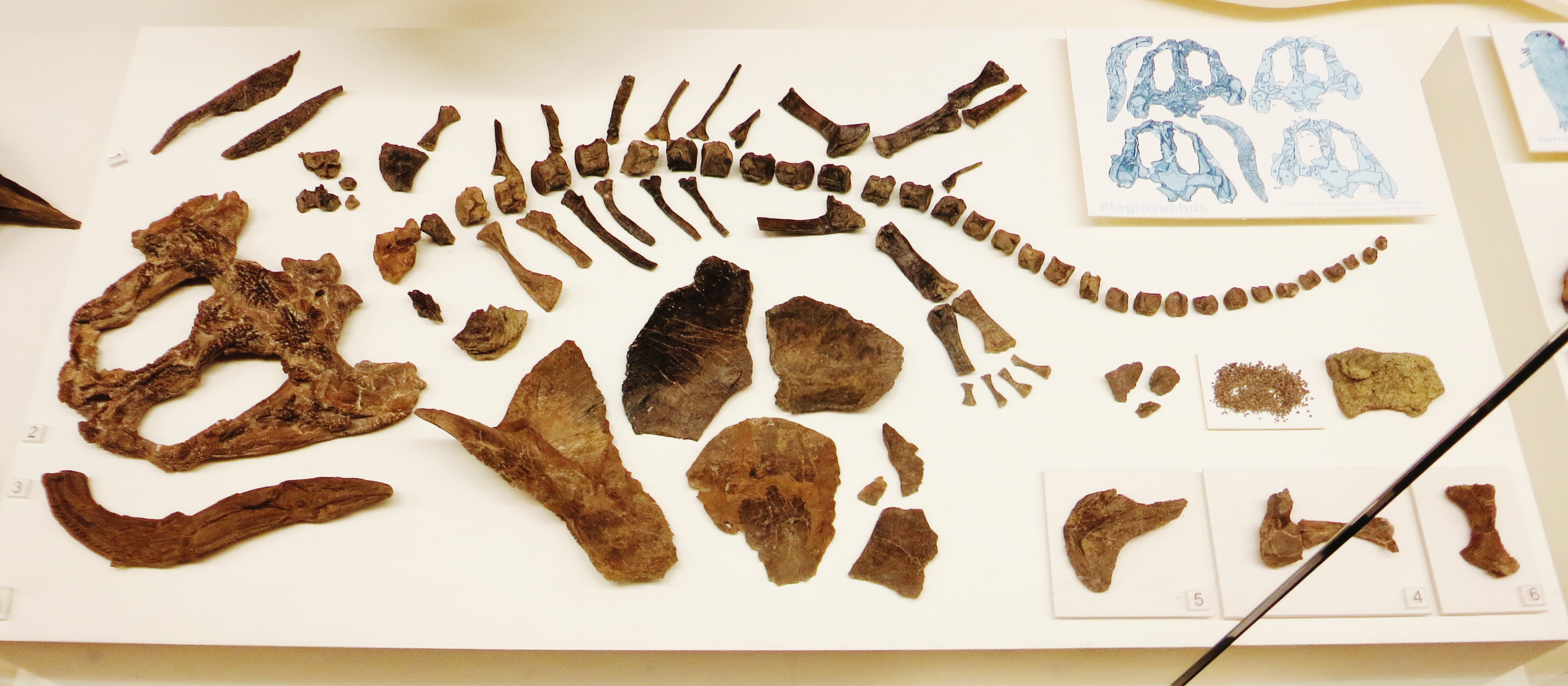

Scientific classification
- Kingdom: Animalia
- Phylum: Chordata
- Clade: Tetrapoda
- Order: †Temnospondyli
- Suborder: †Stereospondyli
- Family: †Plagiosauridae
- Genus: †Plagiosuchus; Huene, 1922

Type species
- † Plagiosuchus pustuliferus Fraas, 1896

= Plagiosuchus =

Plagiosuchus Temporal range: Triassic, 242.0–235 Ma

Extinct genus of amphibians

Plagiosuchus is an extinct genus of plagiosaurid temnospondyl. It is known from several collections from the Middle Triassic of Germany.

== History of study ==
The type and only species of Plagiosuchus, P. pustuliferus, was originally described as a species of Plagiosternum, with the specific epithet as 'pustuliferum' by Eberhard Fraas in 1896. The interclavicle described and figured by Fraas had originally been noted by him as Labyrinthodon sp. in an 1889 publication and before that by von Meyer and Plienenger in a 1844 publication. This interclavicle was not formalized as the holotype but is recognized as the lectotype. The taxon was reassigned to the newly named genus Plagiosuchus in 1922 by von Huene, who described new material that permitted him to differentiate it from Plagiosternum granulosum; this was also when the specific epithet was grammatically modified. Additional material was referenced and briefly figured by Hellrung (2003) and Werneburg and Witter (2005), but most of the osteology comes from the description of a complete skull, figured by Hellrung, by Damiani et al. (2009). Histology of the osteoderms and the limbs has also been analyzed.

== Anatomy ==
Plagiosuchus has a relatively long skull for a plagiosaurid, approximately as long as it is wide. However, its most defining feature is its greatly enlarged orbit, which forms a massive orbitotemporal fenestra with the loss of several post-orbital bones, including the postfrontal and the postorbital, and the reduction of several others. This fenestra is about 80% of the total length of the skull. The subtemporal vacuity on the palate is also correspondingly long, while the tooth rows are short, confined to the anterior portion of the skull. Ornamentation varies across the skeleton, with the distinct pustules found in many other plagiosaurids found on the pectoral elements, more typical temnospondyl ridging on the mandible, and more irregular large tubercles on the skull.

== See also ==
- Prehistoric amphibian
- List of prehistoric amphibians
