= Elatosaurus =

Scientific classification
- Domain: Eukaryota
- Kingdom: Animalia
- Phylum: Chordata
- Clade: Synapsida
- Genus: †Elatosaurus; Kalandadze, 1985

Extinct genus of dicynodonts

Elatosaurus is an extinct genus of non-mammalian synapsid discovered by synapsid paleontologist Nikolay Kalandadze.

== See also ==
- List of therapsids
