= Donguz test site =

Coordinates: 51°32′10″N 54°59′30″E

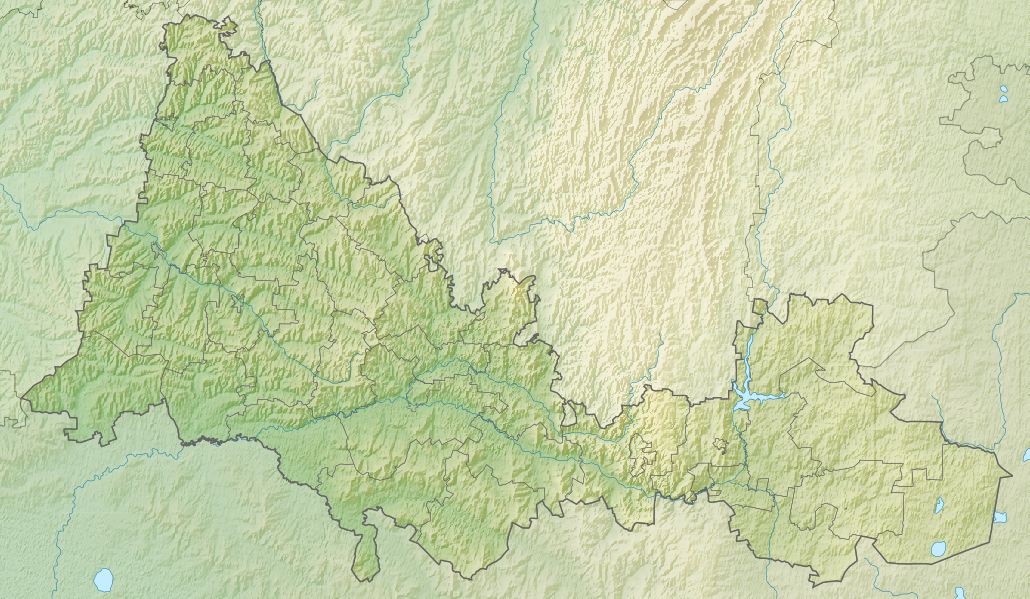
Donguz test site
Donguz test site (European Russia)
Donguz test site (Russia)

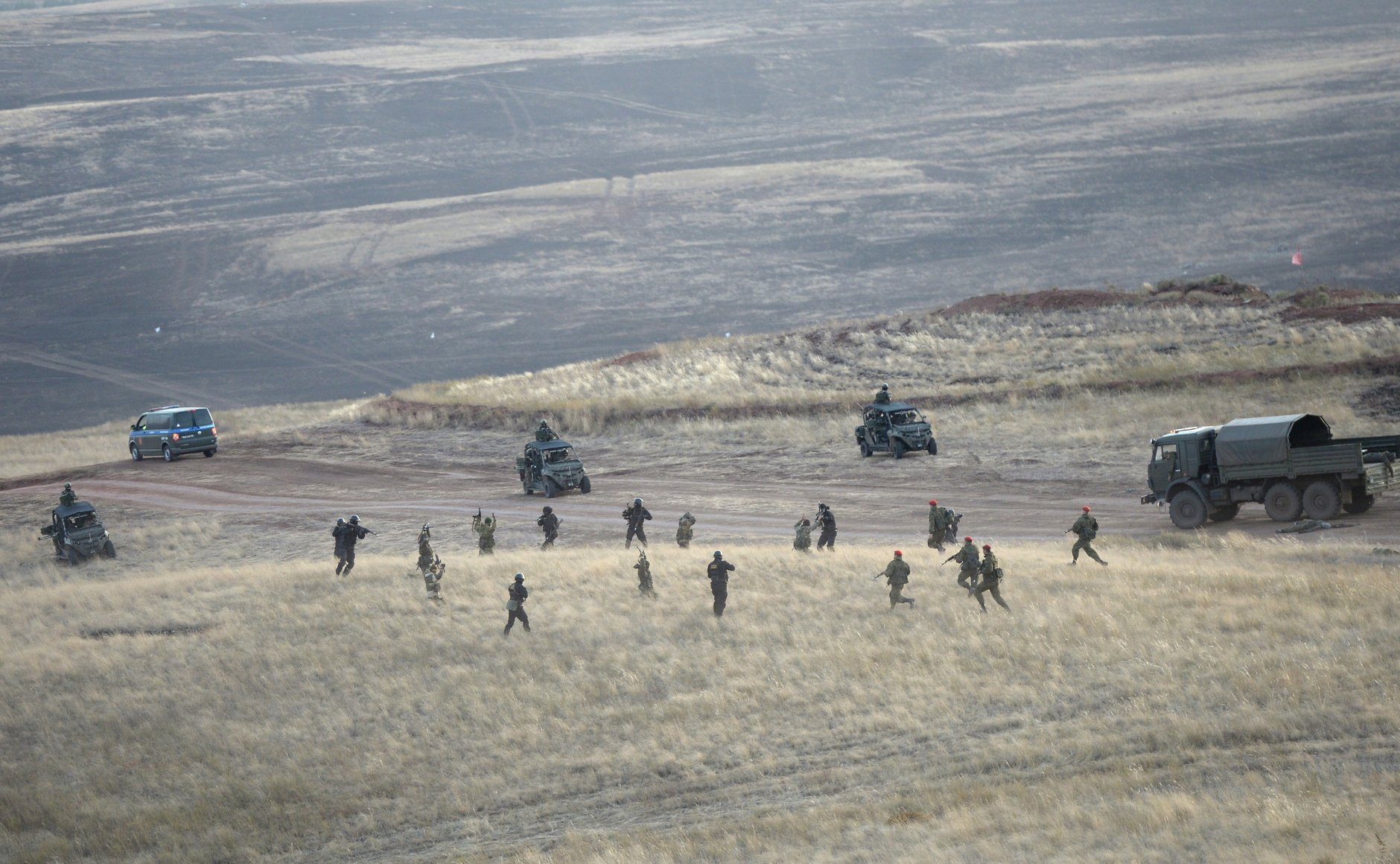
Military execrise Center 2015 at the site

Donguz test site (Russian: Донгузский полигон, full name: Russian: Испытательный Полигон Федерального бюджетного учреждения 3-го центрального научно-исследовательского института Министерства обороны Российской Федерации, formerly known as Научно-испытательный полигон ПВО МО РФ, в/ч 33157,Научно-Испытательный Зенитно-Артиллерийский Полигон — НИЗАП) is a military proving ground in Orenburg Oblast, Russia. Site administration and main living quarters are in the settlement of Pervomaysky. The site occupies about 121,000 hectares of steppe, making it the largest in Orenburg Oblast.

In 2012, there was a major explosion at the site, when a trainload with over 4,000 tonnes of ammunition delivered for disposal blew up.

Due to the specific utilization of this steppe area ("Donguz Steppe" shooting range), it is the last in Europe remaining virgin land with representative flora and fauna, and the military command pledged to ensure the preservation of the biodiversity in the area.
