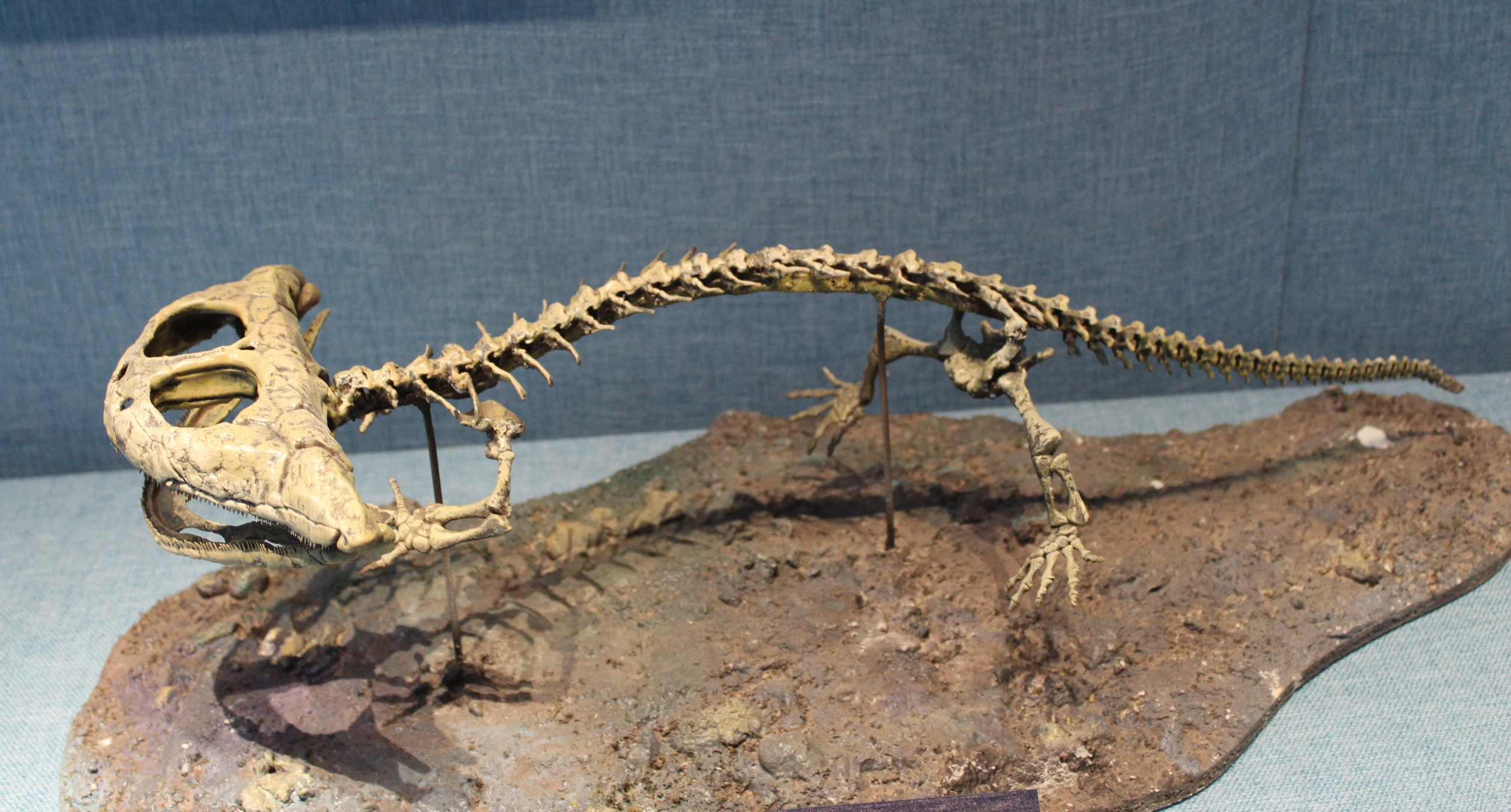
- Reconstructed skeletal mount at the Baoding Natural History Museum

Scientific classification
- Kingdom: Animalia
- Phylum: Chordata
- Clade: Tetrapoda
- Order: †Temnospondyli
- Suborder: †Stereospondyli
- Family: †Plagiosauridae
- Genus: †Plagiosternum; Fraas, 1896

= Plagiosternum =

Plagiosternum Temporal range: Middle Triassic

Extinct genus of amphibians

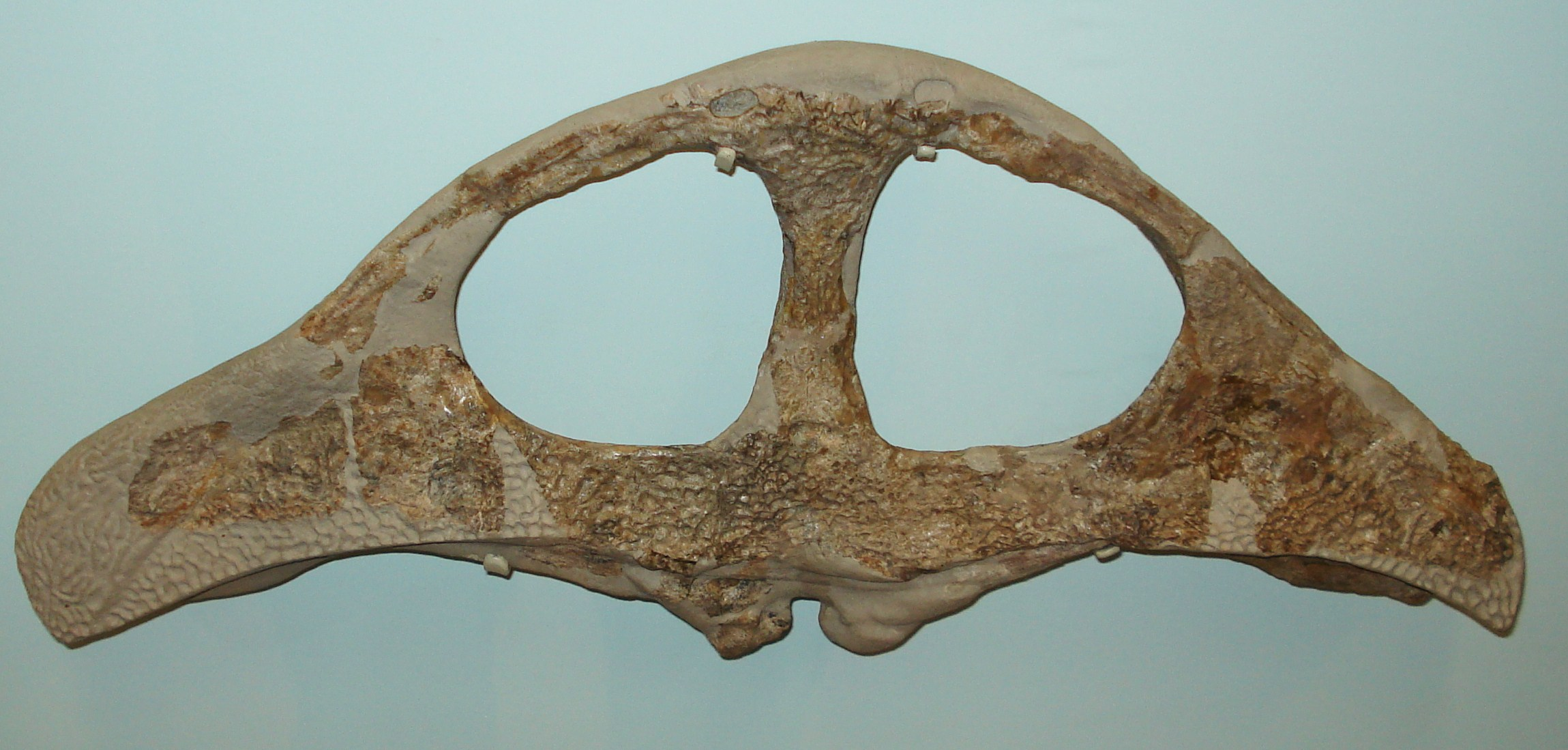
Skull of P. granulosoum

Plagiosternum (plae-jee-oh-ster-num, meaning "sideways breastbone") was a middle Triassic temnospondyl that is native to Spitzbergen.

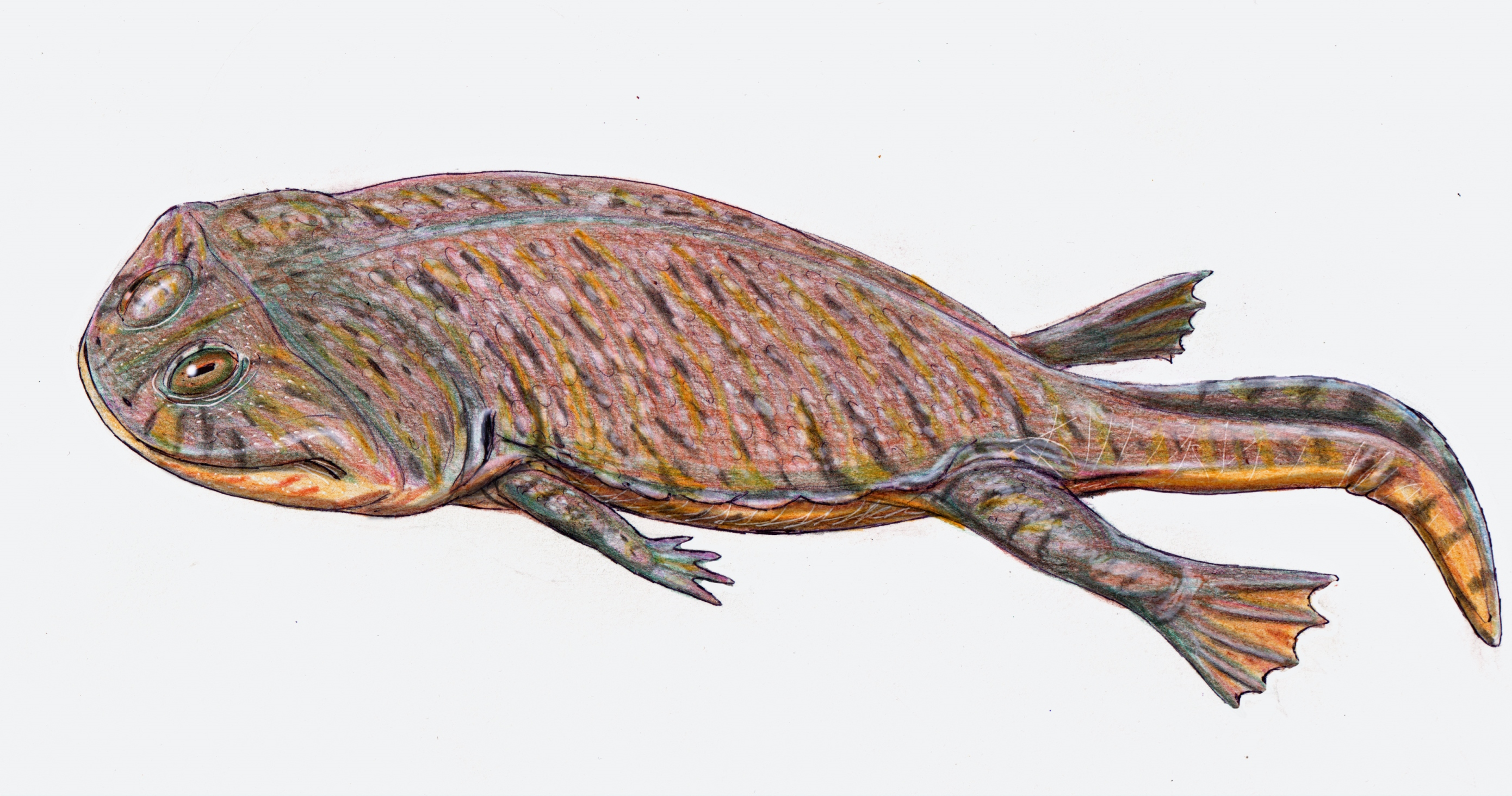
Restoration
