= Ladinian =

Age in the Middle Triassic

- 241.464 ± 0.28 – ~237 Ma
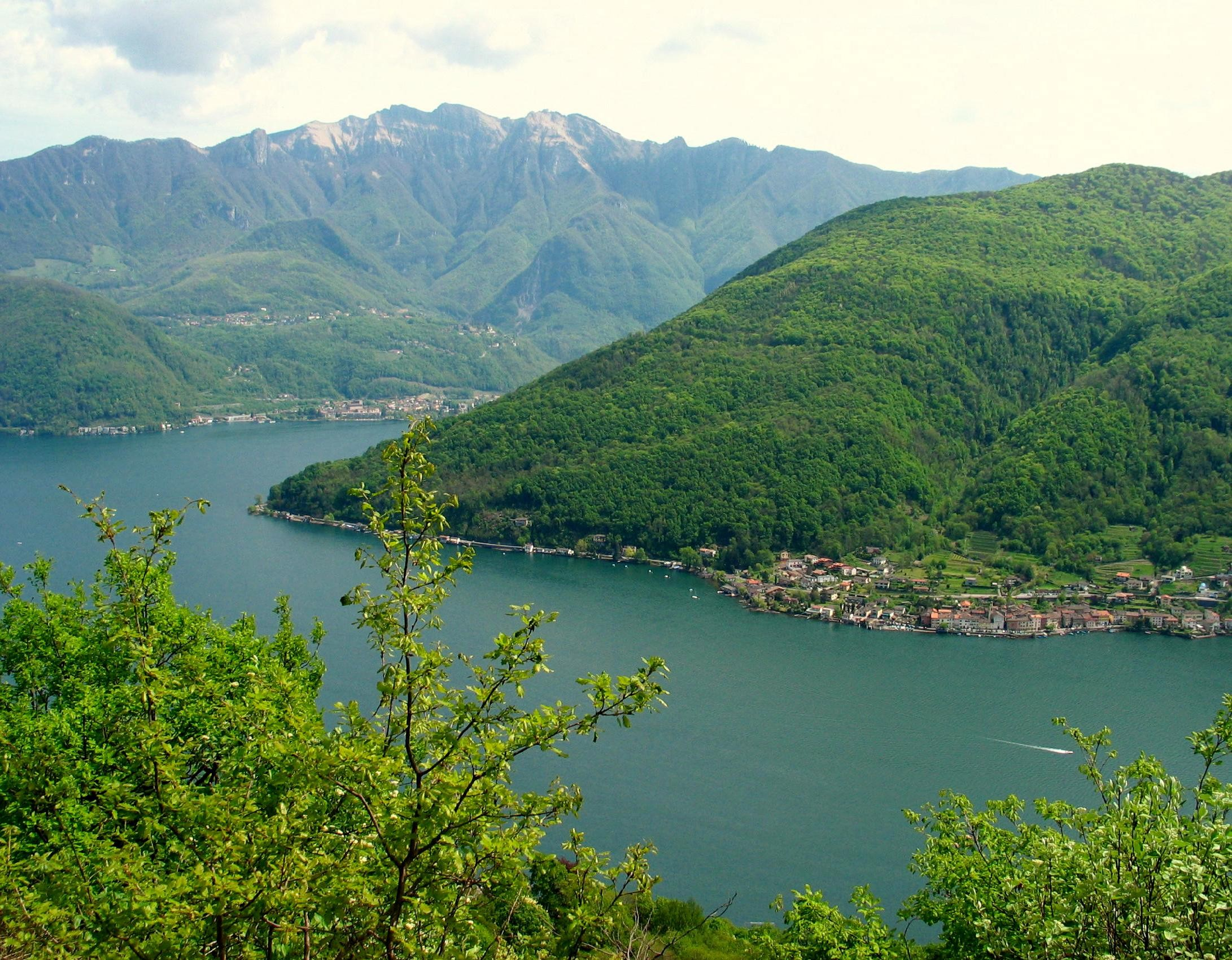
- Monte San Giorgio exhibits exceptionally preserved Ladinian vertebrate fossils

Chronology
← / Triassic–Jurassic extinction event; ← / Scleractinian corals & calcified sponges; ← / Carnian pluvial episode; ← / Manicouagan impact; ← / Coals return; ← / Full recovery of woody trees; ← / Smithian–Spathian boundary event; ← / Permian-Triassic extinction event
Subdivision of the Triassic according to the ICS, as of 2024. Vertical axis scale: Millions of years ago

Etymology
- Name formality: Formal

Usage information
- Celestial body: Earth
- Regional usage: Global (ICS)
- Time scale(s) used: ICS Time Scale

Definition
- Chronological unit: Age
- Stratigraphic unit: Stage
- Time span formality: Formal
- Lower boundary definition: FAD of the Ammonite Eoprotrachyceras curionii
- Lower boundary GSSP: Bagolino, Lombardian pre-Alps, Italy; 45.8193°N 10.4710°E
- Lower GSSP ratified: 2005
- Upper boundary definition: FAD of the Ammonite Daxatina canadensis
- Upper boundary GSSP: Prati di Stuores, Dolomites, Italy; 46.5269°N 11.9303°E
- Upper GSSP ratified: 2008

The Ladinian is a stage and age in the Middle Triassic series or epoch. It spans the time between 241.464 Ma and ~237 Ma (million years ago). The Ladinian was preceded by the Anisian and succeeded by the Carnian (part of the Upper or Late Triassic).

The Ladinian is coeval with the Falangian regional stage used in China.

== Stratigraphic definitions ==
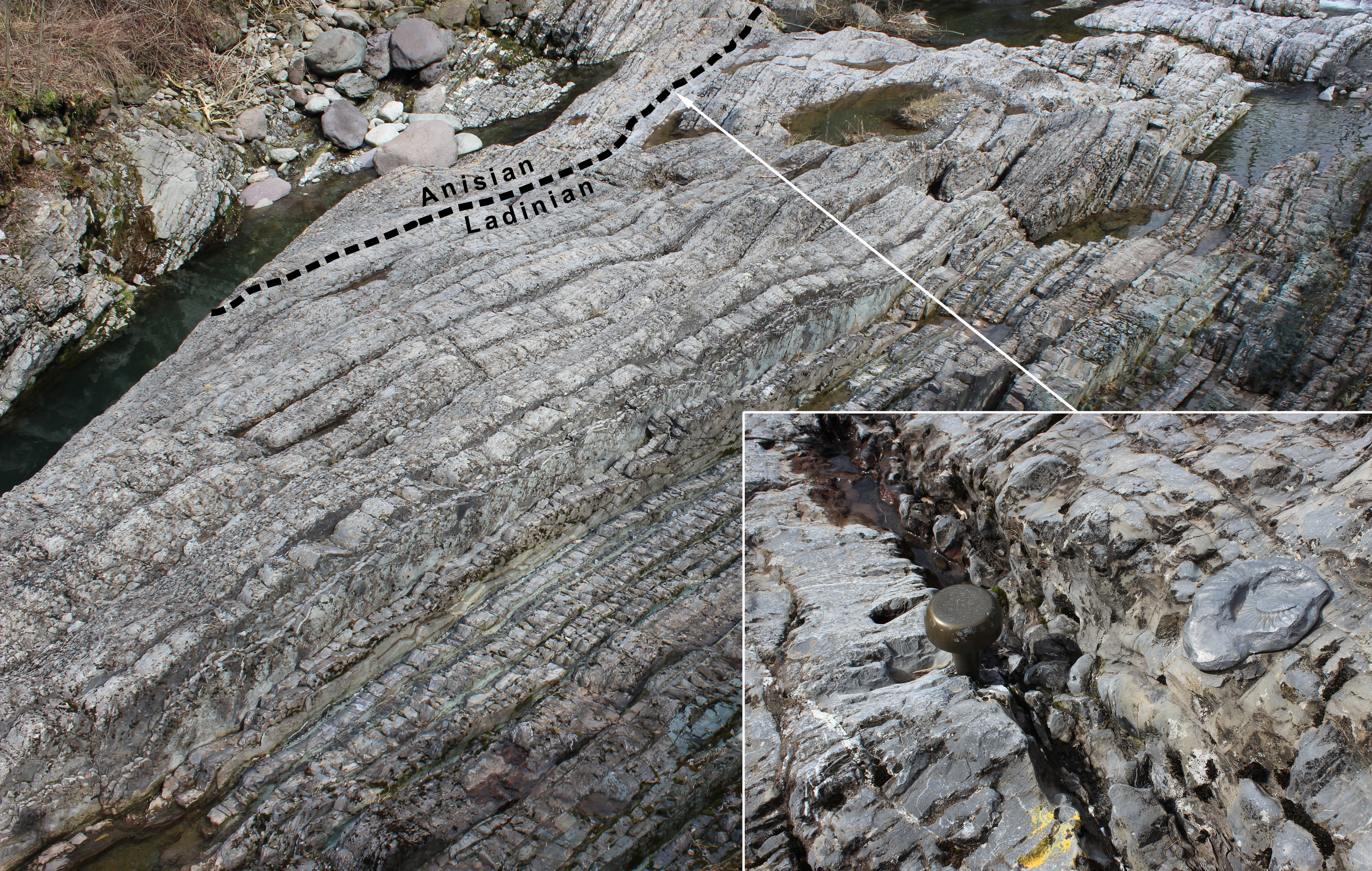
The GSSP of the Ladinian at Bagolino in Italy

The Ladinian was established by Austrian geologist Alexander Bittner in 1892. Its name comes from the Ladin people that live in the Italian Alps (in the Dolomites, then part of Austria-Hungary).

The base of the Ladinian Stage is defined as the place in the stratigraphic record where the ammonite species Eoprotrachyceras curionii first appears or the first appearance of the conodont Budurovignathus praehungaricus. The global reference profile for the base (the GSSP) is at an outcrop in the river bed of the Caffaro river at Bagolino, in the province of Brescia, northern Italy. The top of the Ladinian (the base of the Carnian) is at the first appearance of ammonite species Daxatina canadensis.

The Ladinian is sometimes subdivided into two subages or substages, the Fassanian (early or lower) and the Longobardian (late or upper). The Ladinian contains four ammonite biozones, which are evenly distributed among the two substages:

- zone of Frechites regoledanus
- zone of Protrachyceras archelaus
- zone of Protrachyceras gredleri
- zone of Eoprotrachyceras curionii

== Notable formations ==
- Upper Besano Formation (Switzerland and Italy)
- San Cassiano Formation (Italy)
- Wengen Formation (Italy and Montenegro)
- Erfurt Formation / Lower Keuper (Germany)
- Jilh Formation (Saudi Arabia)
- Meride Limestone (Switzerland and Italy)
- Upper Muschelkalk (central Europe)
- Perledo-Varenna Formation (Italy)
- Prosanto Formation (Switzerland)
- Zhuganpo Formation / Zhuganpo Member of the Falang Formation (late Ladinian - early Carnian) (Guizhou and Yunnan, China)
