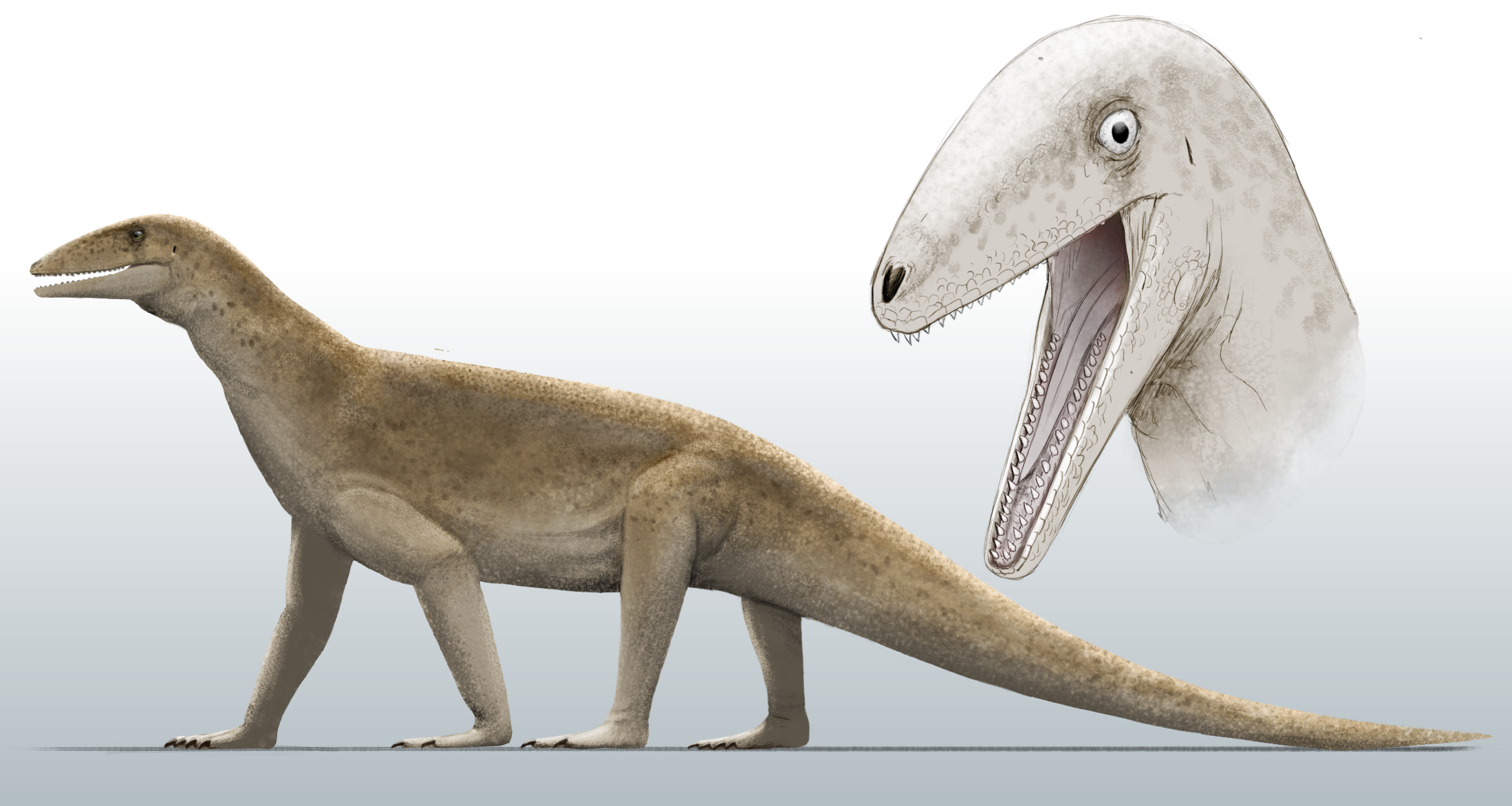
- Life reconstruction of Puercosuchus traverorum

Scientific classification
- Kingdom: Animalia
- Phylum: Chordata
- Class: Reptilia
- Clade: †Allokotosauria
- Family: †Azendohsauridae
- Subfamily: †Malerisaurinae
- Genus: †Puercosuchus; Marsh et al., 2022
- Species: †P. traverorum

Binomial name
- †Puercosuchus traverorum Marsh et al., 2022

= Puercosuchus =

Puercosuchus Temporal range: Late Triassic, Norian 220–218 Ma

Extinct genus of reptile

Puercosuchus (translated literally as "Puerco River crocodile") is an extinct genus of archosauromorph reptile from the Late Triassic (Norian) of what is now Arizona, North America. It includes only the type species P. traverorum, and was described and named in 2022. Puercosuchus is known mainly from two bonebeds in the Blue Mesa Member of the Chinle Formation, preserving the mixed remains of multiple individuals in each one representing almost the entire skeleton.

It is a member of the Azendohsauridae, a clade of Triassic reptiles that was initially recognised by adaptations for herbivory. However, Puercosuchus and its close relatives in the subclade Malerisaurinae retained the carnivorous diet and body form ancestral to archosauromorphs. Unlike non-malerisaurine azendohsaurids, Puercosuchus had a long and shallow snout with sharp, blade-like teeth similar to those of carnivorous dinosaurs.

Despite its seemingly ancestral morphology and ecology, Puercosuchus is the youngest known genus of azendohsaurid in the world. The discovery of Puercosuchus allowed palaeontologists to recognise similar bones and teeth that had been collected from Late Triassic southwestern North America in the past as belonging to it or similar animals, acting as a sort of "rosetta stone" for malerisaurine azendohsaurid anatomy.

== Description ==
Puercosuchus was a mid-sized quadrupedal reptile that broadly resembled other large azendohsaurids in general shape. It was robustly built–albeit less bulky than Azendohsaurus or Shringasaurus–with deep shoulders, sprawling limbs and the characteristically long and raised neck of azendohsaurids. Unlike other large azendohsaurids, its skull was more like those of earlier predatory archosauromorphs, with a proportionally longer and lower snout as well as recurved teeth with fine serrations. The tail of Puercosuchus is also longer and more tapering compared to the shortened tails of other large azendohsaurids. Puercosuchus is known by almost its entire skeleton, but because its bones have only been found disarticulated and mixed together in bonebeds with few associated remains its overall limb and body proportions cannot be determined.

=== Skull ===
The skull of Puercosuchus is longer and lower than those of non-malerisaurine azendohsaurids, similar to that of Prolacerta, with a shallow and triangular-shaped maxilla lacking the tall ascending process of Azendohsaurus and possessing at least 19 teeth (compared to the 12–14 in the maxilla of Azendohsaurus). Like other azendohsaurids the nasal bones and premaxilla do not meet to form an internarial bar separating the nostrils, leaving a single confluent opening for the nostrils that faces up and forwards at the tip of the snout.

Several bones from the roof of the skull are known, including the frontals, prefrontals, postfrontals and parietal bones, although the fragmentary parietal preserves little information on the surrounding structures (namely the upper temporal fenestra and pineal foramen). The frontals are roughly rectangular and lack bony ornamentation (including along the margin of the orbits, unlike Azendohsaurus) but are drawn up to form a low bony keel down the middle of the skull where the two frontals meet. This is a unique to Puercosuchus among azendohsaurids. The prefrontals form the curved top front corner of the orbits. Unlike the frontals, the bone around the orbital margin is thickened and rugose. It has two fossae, a large triangular one on the inside surface and another smaller one laterally at its upper front edge. Its articulations with other bones of the skull are unclear. The postfrontal is a tall bone forming the rear edge of the orbit, it has a ridge of bone on its lower process that runs up and back to rim the edge of the lower temporal fenestra (the opening in the skull behind the eye). Its upper surface behind the orbital rim is flat and ornamented with striations.

The quadrate bone sits at the rear corner of the skull, and like other azendohsaurids its head sports a prominent hook projecting back from the skull. However, this hook is sharper and more pointed in Puercosuchus than other azendohsaurids. This hook sits above the otic notch where the tympanic membrane, or eardrum, would have sat just behind the quadrate.

The mandible is known by the tooth-bearing dentary, the angular, prearticular, and the fused surangular and articular. The dentary is long, slender and straight edged along its length, although it is slightly expanded down towards its tip (though not deflected down as in Azendohsaurus) with the bottom edge curving up at the tip. The back of the dentary connects to the postdentary bones, namely the surganular above and the angular below. The angular is elongate, deepest at the front and is straight edged along the bottom. There is no sign of a mandibular fenestra behind the angular, and it articulates with the prearticular on its inner surface. The surangular sports a raised triangular coronoid eminence just behind the dentary, which then tapers downwards through to the fused articular and to the jaw joint. The retroarticular process of the articular, which attached to the jaw-opening depressor mandibulae muscle, is short and hooked upwards.

==== Braincase ====
Numerous bones of the braincase are preserved. The single supraoccipital, paired opisthotics and prootics are fused together. The supraoccipital forms the upper rear surface of the skull and has a pair of short processes that would have contacted the parietals in front. Beneath it, the paired opisthotics on either side of the braincase have long but narrow paraoccipital processes that are vertically expanded at their tips. Another processes that descends below each opisthotic is pierced by a foramen not known in any other azendohsaurid, and its function is unclear. The prootics within the skull are fused to the front of each opisthotic, and they curve up and inwards to partially roof the brain cavity. The prootic has two processes that meet the opisthotic, a lateral process that runs along the paraoccipital processes, and a ventral process that contributes to the fenestra ovalis (the opening to the inner ear).

The ventral prootic processes also contacts the parabasisphenoid, a single bone which forms the floor of the braincase. Around half of the length of the parabasisphenoid is the cultriform process, a long and narrow blade-like process that extends along the middle of the palate. The cultriform process of Puercosuchus is deflected upwards but kinked in the middle so that its front half continues horizontally. Both the basipterygoid processes (contacting the pterygoid bones beneath it) in front and the basal tubera at the rear project out and down from the parabasisphenoid on either side. Unusually, Puercosuchus had a single tooth between the basipterygoid processes at the base of the cultriform processes, a trait unknown in other azendohsaurids and typically seen in more basal diapsids.

==== Teeth ====
The teeth of Puercosuchus are heterodont, with noticeably different sizes and shapes throughout the jaw. The first tooth in each premaxilla is long and slightly procumbent (projecting forwards from the jaw). The first tooth also lacks serrations, while the remaining three premaxillary teeth are finely serrated. All the premaxillary teeth have a rounded cross section at their base, but taper to more compressed sharp points at their tips. In the maxilla, the teeth at the front are large, recurved and blade-like with fine serrations, resembling the teeth of predatory theropod dinosaurs. Further back, the teeth gradually become shorter, stouter and more leaf-shaped with larger denticles. The dentary teeth are similarly heterodont, shifting from sharp and blade-like to leaf-shaped teeth further back. Like in the upper jaw, the first tooth sits very far forward, almost at the very tip of the dentary. All of its teeth are ankylothecodont–their roots fused with the jaw bones–as is typical for azendohsaurids and other archosauromorphs.

Like other azendohsaurids, Puercosuchus has palatal teeth on the roof of its mouth, with a single diagonal row of about 15 small teeth on each palatine and numerous more on the pterygoid bones. The pterygoid teeth are arranged into four fields, a horizontal row of approximately five along the rear edge (T1), two diagonal rows in front (T2 and T3), and a short row (approximately four) on its inner edge (T4). The T2 and T3 fields further divide into two bifurcated ridges each (T2a, T2b, T3a, and T3b) and contain ~22 and ~30 teeth, respectively. The palatal teeth are simpler and more peg-like than the well-developed palatal teeth of Azendohsaurus and Shringasaurus or even Malerisaurus, with only a slight recurve to them and lacking serrations.

=== Skeleton ===
The vertebral column of Puercosuchus is almost completely known, with vertebrae from every major section of the neck, back, hips and tail represented in the bonebeds. However, the total vertebral count and their relative proportions cannot be known without a single associated skeleton. Like other azendohsaurids, the neck was long with elongated cervical vertebrae that gradually decrease in length down to the base of the neck. The front and rear faces of the cervical centra, the main body of the vertebrae, are vertically offset from each other, a trait found in other azendohsaurids indicative of an elevated neck posture. The neural spines of the anterior cervicals are long and expand in length towards the top to overhang the front of the centrum. The tops of the neural spines are flattened out and broader than their bases, widest toward the front and slightly bifurcated at both ends. The shorter posterior cervicals also have tall neural spines, but they are much less expanded and are only flared out at the top at their midpoints.

The dorsal vertebrae in the back are proportionally more elongate in Puercosuchus compared to Azendohsaurus and are of roughly consistent size, unlike the shortened posterior trunk of Azendohsaurus. Like other azendohsaurids, Puercosuchus had two sacral vertebrae with large sacral ribs that articulated with the ilia of the hips. Notably, the sacral ribs of Puercosuchus project largely horizontally from the vertebrae, compared to the relatively more downward deflected ribs of Azendohsaurus and Shringasaurus. Unlike other azendohsaurids, whose caudal vertebrae decrease in length down the tail, the anterior caudals of Puercosuchus are the shortest (indeed, they are the relatively shortest vertebrae in the whole column) while the middle to posterior caudals are more elongate and slender, giving it a long and tapering tail. Similarly, the neural spines start off tall and subrectangular, projecting dorsally, but become longer and lower with raised rounded and expanded tips down the tail until they are reduced to a low ridge before disappearing entirely. Unusually, Puercosuchus has an extra processes projecting up in front of the neural spines on the posterior caudals, and they are indeed taller than the low neural spines themselves.

The cervical ribs of the neck are long and narrow at first, similar to other azendohsaurids; however, the ribs at the back of the neck are shorter and stouter. Both the cervical and trunk ribs are double headed (dichocephalous) with separate diapophyses and parapophyses on the vertebrae, unlike Malerisaurus robinsonae. However, these fuse into a single facet further back in the trunk and so the last ribs were likely single headed (holocephalous). Puercosuchus also possessed a basket of gastralia, or belly ribs, which may have been relatively well ossified compared to Azendohsaurus. Chevrons are present along the length of the tail, the first of which have only short arms that do not meet below the vertebrae, while those further down the tail form complete haemal arches with long ventral processes that become more pointed and tapered down the length of the tail.

==== Limbs and girdles ====
The humerus is broadly similar to other azendohsaurids, with widely expanded ends and a prominent deltopectoral crest, although its shaft is more slender than those of Azendohsaurus or Shringasaurus. The ulna is more expanded proximally with a developed olecranon process at the elbow, which is comparatively more rounded rather than pointed as in Azendohsaurus. Some of the referred specimens also have an extra bony ossification sutured to the end of the olecranon process, which only occurs in some other archosauromorphs such as Protorosaurus. The anteromedial (or coronoid) process of the ulna is uniquely hooked in Puercosuchus, compared to the rounded anteromedial process of Azendohsaurus. The radius is also wider proximally, and like other malerisaurines (but not Azendohsaurus) its proximal end has an upward-curving and pointed posterior process, although it is larger in Puercosuchus than Malerisaurus. Only the metacarpals are known from the hand, lacking the phalanges of the digits, of which the fifth metacarpal is noticeably proportionately shorter than the others. Isolated claws (unguals) of Puercosuchus are hooked, as in other azendohsaurids, with the largest showing the strongest curvature. It is not known whether these claws come from the fore or hind feet, but strongly curved claws are present on both in other azendohsaurids.

The scapula (shoulder blade) of Puercosuchus is similar to other azendohsaurids, being tall and relatively broad, although it is not constricted anywhere along its length unlike those of Azendohsaurus or Shringasaurus. Like them, though, the glenoid (shoulder joint) faces not only out to the side but back as well. The interclavicle, a bone that connects each side of the shoulder girdle down the middle of the chest, is T-shaped with two sharply projecting lateral processes that articulate with the clavicles. It sports a pair of short anterior processes at the front with a notch in between, typical of various other archosauromorphs (such as Prolacerta) but differing from both the single pointed anterior process of Azendohsaurus and Shringasaurus and the smooth anterior margin of Malerisaurus.

The hips (pelvic girdle) are overall similar to that of Azendohsaurus, including a pointed and tapering posterior process on the ilium. However, the anterior process in front of the hip socket is much shorter in Puercosuchus. Its femur is long and somewhat S-shaped, as in Azendohsaurus, but like the humerus is comparatively more gracile. Similarly, the tibia is not as robust, including a smaller cnemial crest for muscle attachment. The fibula is twisted into an S-shape and compressed from side-to-side, with a ridge on its front and rear surfaces. Uniquely, Puercosuchus also has a rounded ridge and associated groove on the lower half of its inner surface. In some regards, the bones of the ankle such as the astragalus bone are more similarly shaped to those of Trilophosaurus, but still bear azendohsaurid features (such as a longer attachment for the fibula). Similar to the forelimb, the only definitively known parts of the feet are the metatarsals, of which the hooked fifth metatarsal has a unique tubercle on its top surface.

== History of discovery ==
Fossils of Puercosuchus are known primarily from two bonebeds in Arizona: the type locality PFV 217 (informally known as "Dinosaur Wash") in the Petrified Forest National Park (PEFO) where Puercosuchus was first recognised, and NMMNH L-3764 (or the "Krzyzanowski bonebed") near the city of St. Johns. Although Dinosaur Wash was discovered in 1998, the Puercosuchus bonebed itself was not discovered until 2014 during a guided Girl Scouts hike as part of an outreach event in 2014. The 10 m^{2} (110 sq ft) bonebed was then subsequently mapped and excavated during the summers of 2014 and 2015, with large blocks of material jacketed and collected along with individually collected isolated bones. The majority of the bones in the Dinosaur Wash are disarticulated and only very rarely in association with each other, even in the same jacket. A single Puercosuchus tooth was discovered at a third locality in Petrified Forest National Park known as PFV 456 (or "Thunderstorm Ridge").

Over 900 bones were collected from the quarry in all, with 492 of the prepared bones belonging to Puercosuchus and hundreds more that remain in field jackets as of 2022. Over 90% of the fossils excavated at Dinosaur Wash belong to Puercosuchus, with the remaining belonging to various fish, temnospondyl amphibians, and other archosauromorphs, making it a monodominant but multitaxic bonebed. At least eight individuals of Puercosuchus are represented at Dinosaur Wash based upon duplicated elements (including eight right fibulae, seven left fibulae and six right quadrates) and belong to animals of varying size and presumably also maturity. Although Puercosuchus was not recognised until the discovery of the bonebed in 2014, additional isolated remains of Puercosuchus had been collected at Dinosaur Wash decades prior, including a large cervical misidentified as belonging to a long-necked plateosaurid dinosaur in 1999.

At the Krzyzanowski Bonebed, fossils of Puercosuchus had been discovered from the early 1990s to 2013. However, they had been incorrectly identified as the bones and teeth of various other disparate reptiles, including theropod, sauropodomorph and ornithischian dinosaurs, phytosaurs, "sphenosuchian" crocodylomorphs, and the related allokotosaur Trilophosaurus. Some isolated bones were even mistakenly referred to actinopterygian fish. The discovery of the Dinosaur Wash bonebed was described by the palaeontologists as like a "Rosetta Stone" for Puercosuchus, allowing for all the previously disparate remains at the Krzyzanowski Bonebed (and elsewhere in the southwestern US) to be referred to a single taxon. Material from the Krzyzanowski Bonebed is found in association more often than at Dinosaur Wash, including parts of the jaws, limbs and backbones.

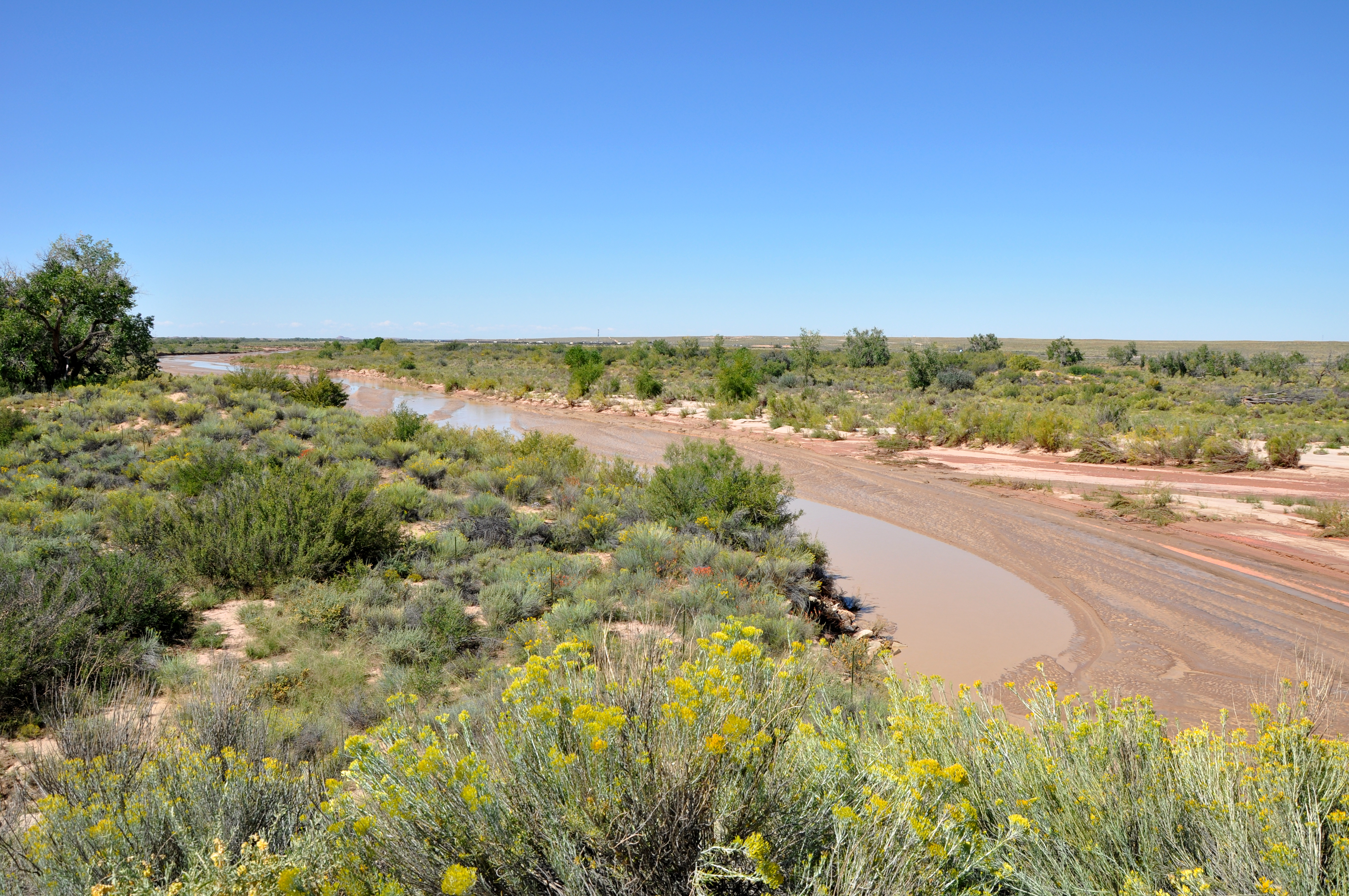
The Puerco River in Arizona, namesake of Puercosuchus

The remains of Puercosuchus were preliminarily described in late 2021, and a full description was published in 2022 wherein it was named as the new genus and species Puercosuchus traverorum. The generic name comes from the Puerco River, which runs through the Petrified Forest National Park and just to the north of the type locality. 'Puerco' itself is Spanish vernacular for "mucky" or "foul", referring to the muddy contents of the river. The suffix -suchus is from Ancient Greek meaning "crocodile", and is a reference to the sprawling "crocodile-like" body plan inferred for it and other allokotosaurs. The specific name traverorum honours both the former superintendent of Petrified Forest National Park and his wife, Brad and Denise Traver, for their support in the park's palaeontology program. Of the numerous bones in each of the bonebeds, an associated right premaxilla and maxilla from Dinosaur Wash catalogued as PEFO 43914 was named as the holotype specimen, with the remaining hypodigm of cranial and entire postcranial referred to it on the basis that no other allokotosaur could be recognised in each of the bonebeds.

Both bonebeds are stratigraphically located within the Blue Mesa Member of the Chinle Formation, which has been radiometrically dated to between 221 and 218 million years old during the Norian stage of the Late Triassic. Dinosaur Wash more precisely correlates to the upper Blue Mesa Member, and so has been roughly estimated to be between 220 and 218 million years old. This corresponds to the Adamanian teilzone, a local biostratigraphic unit in the southwestern United States that precedes a faunal turnover between it and the succeeding Revueltian that saw the extinction of almost all allokotosaurs in North America.

== Classification and taxonomy ==
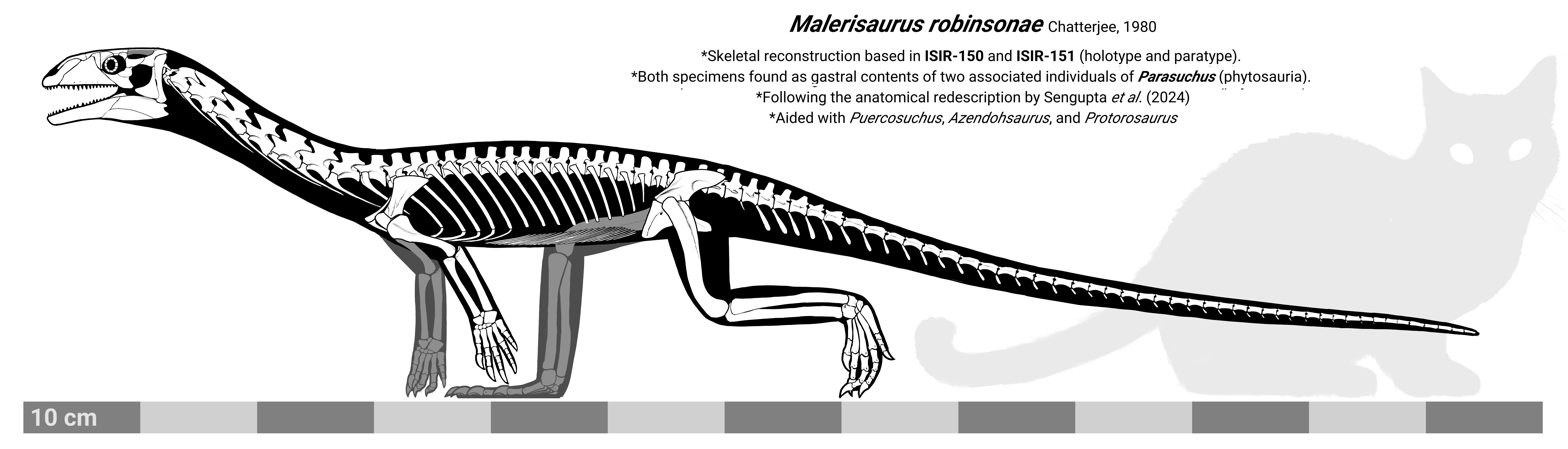
Skeletal reconstruction of the related Malerisaurus robinsonae

Puercosuchus is a member of Azendohsauridae, one of the major subclades of the unusual archosauromorph clade Allokotosauria that was established from the herbivorous and stockily built Azendohsaurus. Puercosuchus further forms the azendohsaurid subclade Malerisaurinae with the closely related but smaller Malerisaurus, which unlike other azendohsaurids and indeed other allokotosaurs were carnivorous.

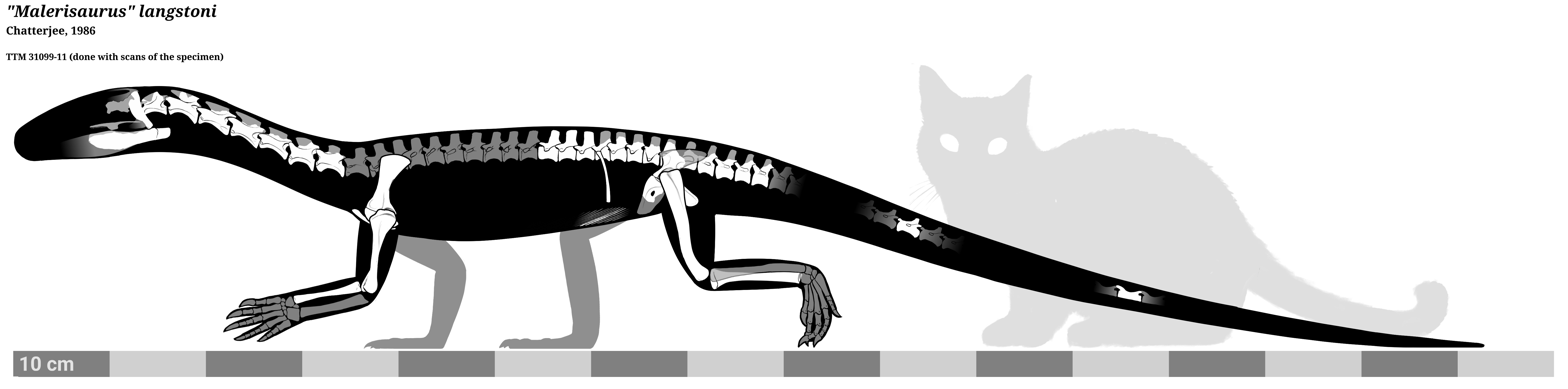
Skeletal reconstruction of the american "Malerisaurus" langstoni, likely more closely related to Puercosuchus

A phylogenetic analysis performed by palaeontologist Sterling J. Nesbitt and colleagues in 2021 included a taxon representing what would later be named Puercosuchus as "Malerisaurus-like taxon PEFO". In their analysis, Puercosuchus was a derived member of Malerisaurine, which was the sister to a subclade including the herbivorous Shringasaurus and two species of Azendohsaurus. Within Malerisaurinae, Puercosuchus was found to potentially be closer to the North American species of Malerisaurus (M. langstoni) than to the Indian M. robinsonae, as well as to another large North American taxon represented by material previously referred to as 'Otischalkia' from the Dockum Group of Texas. The same relationship between Puercosuchus and Malerisaurus spp. were recovered in an updated analysis following the redescription of Malerisaurus robinsonae by Saradee Sengupta and colleagues, irrespective of variations elsewhere within Allokotosauria.

The cladograms below depicts the simplified consensus result of Nesbitt et al. (2021)—where the uncertain relationships of Puercosuchus (as "Malerisaurus-like taxon PEFO") to other malerisaurines are presented as a polytomy—and the results of Sengupta et al. (2024). Relationships in bolded terminal clades are not reproduced for simplicity.

Nesbitt et al. (2021):

- Allokotosauria
  - **Kuehneosauridae**
  - - **Trilophosauridae**
    - Azendohsauridae
      - Pamelaria
      - - - Shringasaurus
          - - Azendohsaurus madagaskarensis
            - Azendohsaurus laaroussii
        - Malerisaurinae
          - Malerisaurus robinsonae
          - - Malerisaurus langstoni
            - Malerisaurus-like form large (Note: Representing material referred to 'Otischalkia elderae' and similar-sized material.)
            - **Malerisaurus-like taxon PEFO** (Note: Puercosuchus.)

Sengupta et al. (2024):

- Allokotosauria
  - **Trilophosauridae**
  - Azendohsauridae
    - - Pamelaria
      - - Shringasaurus
        - - Azendohsaurus madagaskarensis
          - Azendohsaurus laaroussii
    - Malerisaurinae
      - Malerisaurus robinsonae
      - - Malerisaurus langstoni
        - **Puercosuchus**

Based only on the holotype specimen PEFO 43914, Puercosuchus is diagnosed from other azendohsaurids by its procumbent first premaxillary tooth and its heterodont maxillary teeth—although the state of the former feature is unknown in both species of Malerisaurus and the latter unknown for M. langstoni. However, additional diagnostic autapomorphies have been identified from the referred hypodigm, and include the keeled frontals, a quadrate with a hooked and pointed head and a foramen penetrating its body, the cultriform tooth, a foramen on the ventral ramus of the opisthotic, posterior caudal vertebrae with a high anterior process taller than their neural spines, a hooked anteromedial process of the ulna, a ridge on the inner surface of the distal, and a tubercle on the dorsal surface of the fifth metatarsal.

Although Puercosuchus and other malerisaurines are interpreted as retaining the ancestral carnivorous biology of azendohsaurids, it is simultaneously one of the youngest known members of the clade, with most other azendohsaurids only being known from the Middle Triassic and the older Carnian stage of the Late Triassic—only indeterminate malerisaurines from another bonebed in Petrified Forest National Park are slightly younger. Puercosuchus then appears to represent a late-surviving member of a relatively early-diverging lineage of azendohsaurid, having survived later than its more specialised, herbivorous relatives. Its appearance in the fossil record coincides with a faunal turnover in North America between the Adamanian and Revueltian teilzones, which appears to represent the extinction of most allokotosaurs in at least North American ecosystems. As one of the youngest azendohsaurids known, the extinction of Puercosuchus would have coincided with the extinction of azendohsaurids globally. However, in 2024 fossils of malerisaurines distinct from Puercosuchus were discovered in the slightly younger Kaye Quarry of Petrified Forest National Park, dated to the earliest Revueltian (roughly 215-213 million years ago). Puercosuchus thus pre-dates the final extinction of azendohsaurids.

== Palaeobiology and palaeoecology ==
The serrated, recurved teeth of Puercosuchus closely resemble those of theropod dinosaurs (indeed, they are indistinguishable in isolation), and like them Puercosuchus would have had a carnivorous diet (as would other malerisaurines).

Puercosuchus follows a recurring pattern in azendohsaurids where their fossils are found in bonebeds. It remains unclear whether these aggregations are simply due to taphonomy or if it represents a genuine behavioural trait common to Puercosuchus and other azendohsaurids. Gregarious behaviour has been suggested at least for Shringasaurus, which may have lived in mixed-age herds.

=== Growth and pathology ===
The long bones of the limbs of Puercosuchus appear to have grown isometrically, meaning that the proportions of the limb bones (both individually and to each other) stayed approximately the same as it grew (except possibly for the humerus). However, it is not known for sure whether the relative size of each limb bone is indicative of their growth stage, although the smallest and the largest femurs at least do show changes in the size and number of muscle scars associated with ontogenetic growth. Histological analysis of the largest humerus shows signs of skeletal maturity, including more lines of arrested growth and an external fundamental system (a microstructure in the outer layer of the cortical bone in mature bones).

One specimen of Puercosuchus, a small femur, is notably pathological. The distal third of its shaft is noticeably warped and twisted, artificially shortening the length of the femur, and its surface is scarred and shows excessive bone growth (hyperossification). However, it is unclear if this pathology is due to a bone fracture, a cancerous growth, infection (e.g. osteomyelitis), a metabolic bone disease (e.g. osteomalacia) or a developmental disease (e.g. osteogenesis imperfecta) without further investigation.

=== Palaeoecology ===
Although dominating the bonebeds they are known from, Puercosuchus was found alongside a variety of other Late Triassic vertebrates. Metoposaurid temnospondyls and phytosaurs are found at both quarries, while a more diverse fauna of fish and reptiles is known from Dinosaur Wash. This includes coelacanths, hybodont sharks, lungfish, actinopterygian (ray-finned) fishes, a tanystropheid archosauromorph, the semi-aquatic archosauriform Vancleavea, the armoured aetosauriforms Acaenasuchus and a non-desmatosuchin aetosaur, a predatory paracrocodylomorph, and an indeterminate dinosauromorph.
