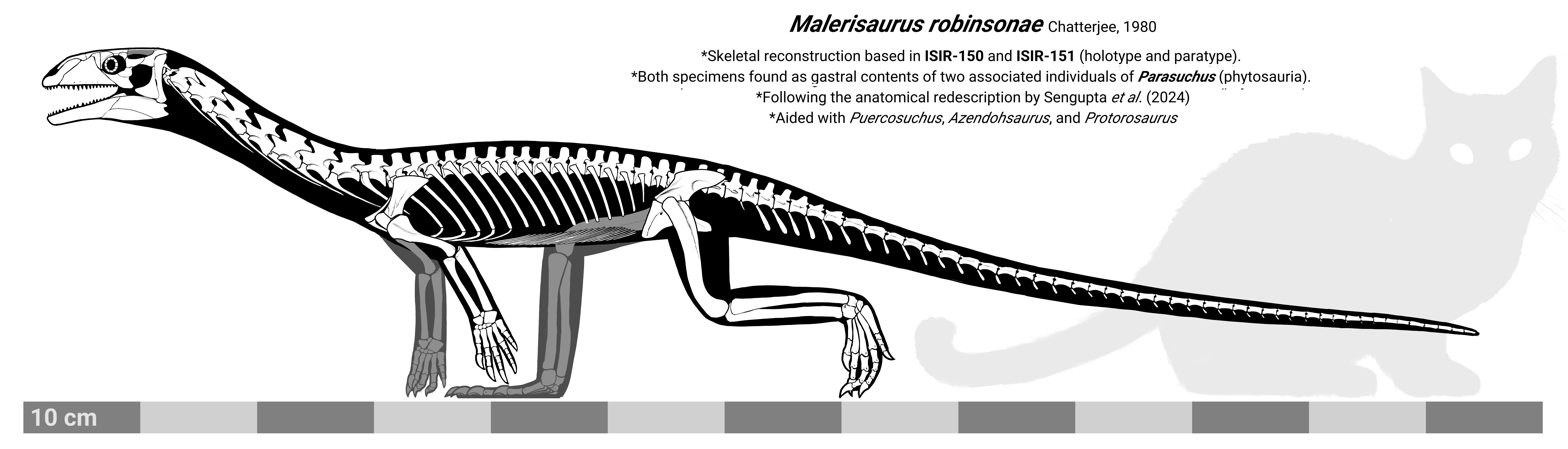
- Skeletal reconstruction
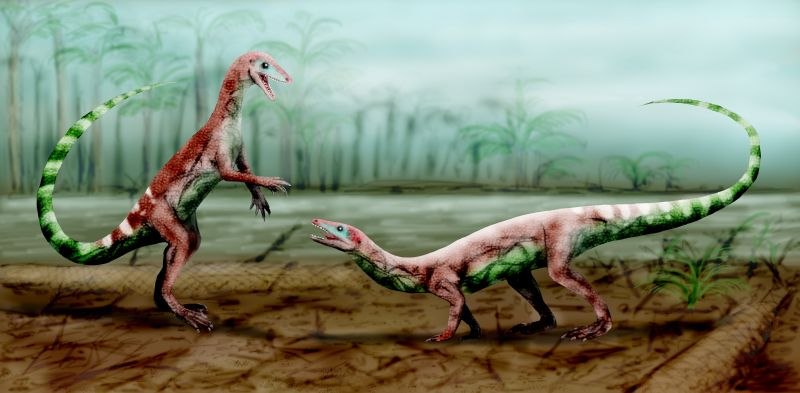
- Malerisaurus robinsonae

Scientific classification
- Kingdom: Animalia
- Phylum: Chordata
- Class: Reptilia
- Clade: †Allokotosauria
- Family: †Azendohsauridae
- Subfamily: †Malerisaurinae
- Genus: †Malerisaurus; Chatterjee, 1980

Species
- †M. robinsonae Chatterjee, 1980 (type); †"M". langstoni? Chatterjee, 1986

= Malerisaurus =

Malerisaurus Temporal range: Late Triassic, 228–215 Ma

Extinct genus of reptiles

Malerisaurus is an extinct genus of archosauromorph known from Telangana of India and Texas of the USA.

== Description ==
Malerisaurus was a medium-sized archosauromorph which averaged 1.3 meters in length. Malerisaurus is known from the holotype ISIR 150, two articulated and almost complete skeletons which were discovered as the presumable gastric contents of two skeletons of Parasuchus hislopi. It was collected from the Lower Maleri Formation, dating to the late Carnian or early Norian stage of the Late Triassic. Malerisaurus robinsonae was a small archosauromorph, probably capable of climbing trees and swimming. The skull has some adaptations to a carnivorous diet, but is nevertheless unspecialised and probably more of an insectivore. Malerisaurus, seen as a diapsid skull, shows primitive and advanced facies in its unossified laterosphenoid, absence of antorbital and mandibular fenestrae, gracile form, primitive girdles, elongated cervicals and absence of dermal armour. Chatterjee (1980) assigned it to the suborder Prolacertiformes, which currently represents four families: Sharovipterygidae, Protorosauridae, Prolacertidae and Tanystropheidae. Chatterjee provisionally regarded Malerisaurus as close to Protorosaurus.

A second species, "Malerisaurus". langstoni, is known from the holotype TMM 31099-11, a partial but poorly preserved skeleton. It was collected in the Otis Chalk Quarry 2 (TMM 31099 locality) from the Colorado City Formation, Chinle Group, dating to the early Carnian stage of the Late Triassic, about 228–227.5 million years ago. It was found in the Howard County of Texas. Spielmann et al. (2006) redescribed the type material of M. langstoni and concluded that it was a chimera from different bones belonging toTrilophosaurus and other small archosaurs, but once more information was available from other allokotosaurs, the specimen was revised and concluded to be the same Malerisaurine individual, likely more closely related to Puercosuchus.

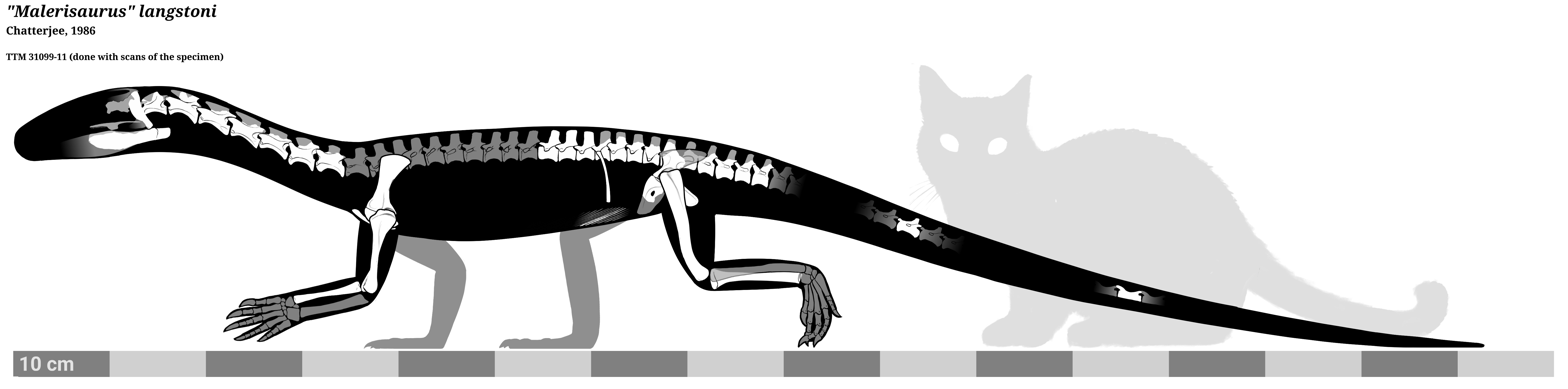
Skeletal reconstruction of the american "Malerisaurus" langstoni, likely more closely related to Puercosuchus

Nesbitt et al. (2017) presented evidence identifying Malerisaurus as an allokotosaurian archosauromorph belonging to the family Azendohsauridae. In 2021, that same group of researchers formally published their work by redescribing Malerisaurus, and found it to be an early-diverging, but late surviving, carnivorous azendohsaurid.Etymology

Malerisaurus was named by Sankar Chatterjee in 1980 and the type species is Malerisaurus robinsonae named in honour of the British Paleontologist who worked in India, Pamela Lamplugh Robinson. A second species, M. langstoni, was named by him in 1986. The generic name is derived from the name of the Lower Maleri Formation, where the holotype of the type species was collected, and sauros, Greek for "lizard". The specific name of M. langstoni honors the American paleontologist and professor Wann Langston, Jr.

== Classification ==
In their 2024 review of Malerisaurus, Sengupta, Ezcurra & Bandyopadhyay analyzed its phylogenetic placement within Azendohsauridae. They recovered Malerisaurus langstoni as the sister taxon to Puercosuchus, with this clade in turn sister to Malerisaurus robinsonae, together forming the clade Malerisaurinae. Their results are displayed in the cladogram below:

- Allokotosauria
  - Trilophosauridae
  - Azendohsauridae
    - Malerisaurinae
      - Malerisaurus robinsonae
      - - Malerisaurus langstoni
        - Puercosuchus
    - - Pamelaria
      - - Shringasaurus
        - - Azendohsaurus laaroussii
          - Azendohsaurus madagaskarensis
