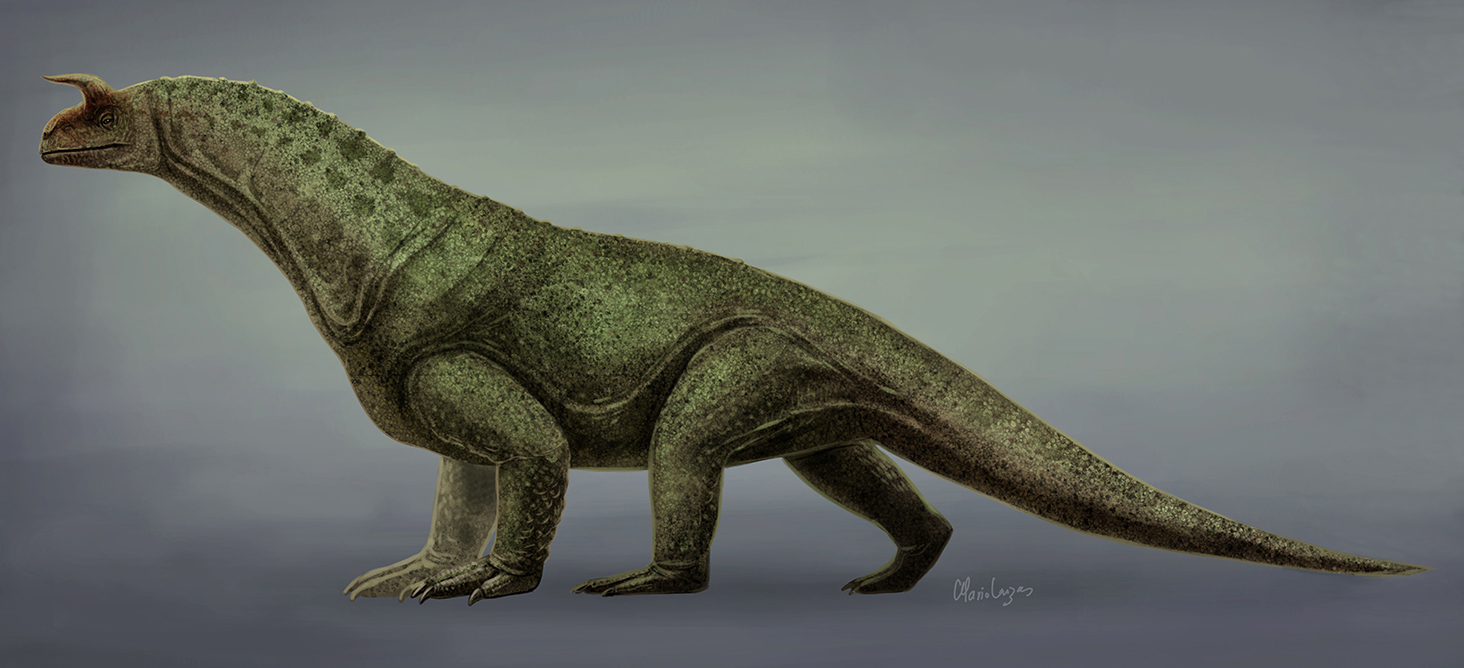
- Life restoration of Shringasaurus indicus
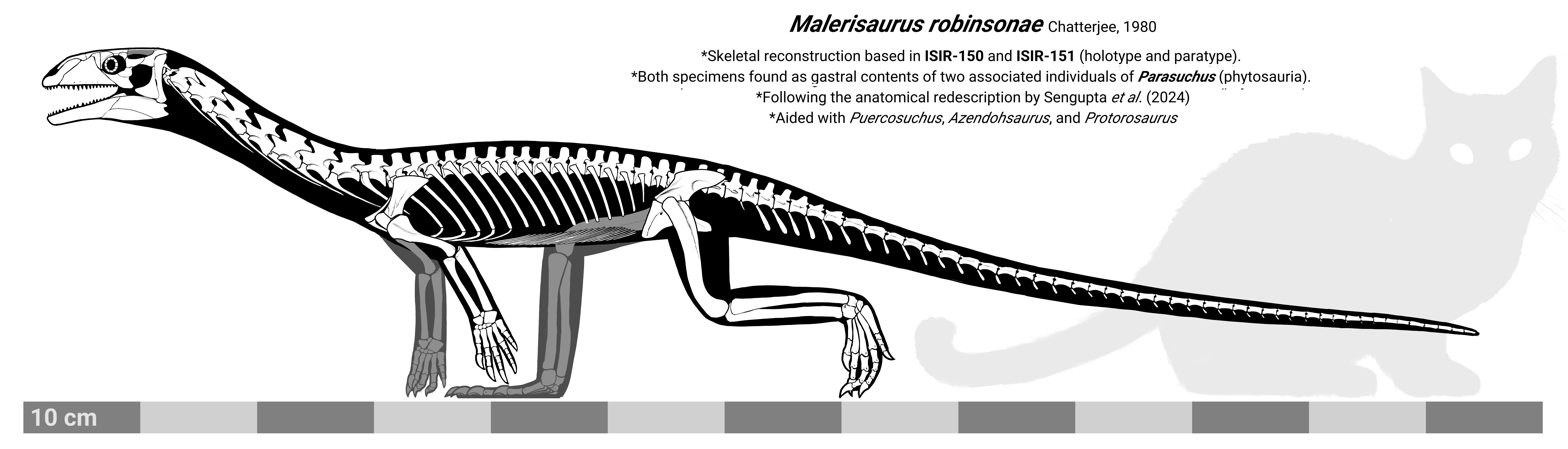
- Skeletal reconstruction of the malerisaurine Malerisaurus robinsonae

Scientific classification
- Kingdom: Animalia
- Phylum: Chordata
- Class: Reptilia
- Clade: †Allokotosauria
- Family: †Azendohsauridae; Nesbitt et al., 2015

Subgroups
- †Azendohsaurus; †Pamelaria; †Shringasaurus; †Malerisaurinae Nesbitt et al., 2021; †Malerisaurus; †Otischalkia? Nomen dubium; †Puercosuchus

= Azendohsauridae =

Azendohsauridae Temporal range: Middle to Late Triassic, Anisian to Norian (~215 Ma) (Precise date of first Anisian appearance uncertain)

Extinct family of reptiles

Azendohsauridae is a family of allokotosaurian archosauromorphs that lived during the Middle to Late Triassic period, minimally between 242-215 million years ago. The family was originally named solely for the eponymous Azendohsaurus, marking out its distinctiveness from other allokotosaurs, but as of 2022 the family now includes four other genera: the basal genus Pamelaria, the large horned herbivore Shringasaurus, and two carnivorous genera grouped into the subfamily-level subclade Malerisaurinae, Malerisaurus and Puercosuchus, and potentially also the dubious genus Otischalkia. Most fossils of azendohsaurids have a Gondwanan distribution, with multiple species known from India, across Morocco and Madagascar in Africa and in Brazil in South America, although fossils of malerisaurine azendohsaurids have also been found in the Southwestern United States of North America.

Azendohsaurids are notable for the various dinosaur-like traits found in some species, including the sauropodomorph-like neck, jaws and teeth of Azendohsaurus, the ceratopsid-like horns of Shringasaurus, and theropod-like teeth of Puercosuchus. These traits are all convergently evolved with later dinosaurs, and some similarities are so striking that it is difficult to distinguish isolated azendohsaurid teeth and jaw bones from those of dinosaurs. Indeed, Azendohsaurus itself was initially described as a herbivorous dinosaur until better remains of its skull and skeleton were found.

== Description ==
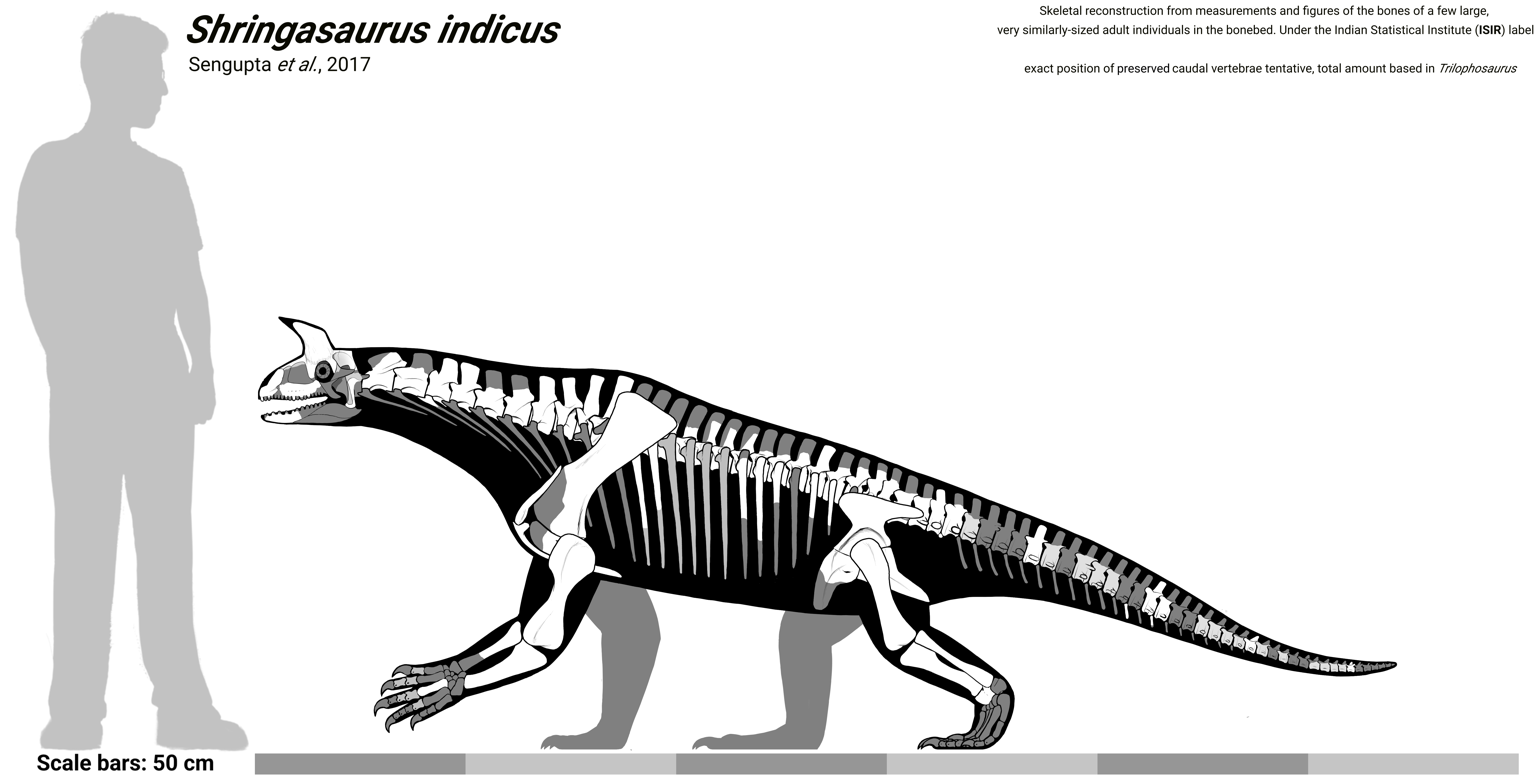
Skeletal reconstruction of Shringasaurus, the largest member of the family.

Azendohsaurids were robust quadrupeds with sprawled limbs, characterised by their long necks and proportionately small heads, and reached body sizes of up to 3 m (9.8 ft) in length in the largest species. Although initially characterised as herbivores based solely on Azendohsaurus, azendohsaurids had a diverse diet and lifestyles including large herbivores, insectivores, and carnivores. Consequently, although broadly similar in body form, their skulls varied from short and boxy with leaf-shaped teeth, to long and narrow with recurved, blade-like teeth.

Azendohsaurids lack a prenarial process, the bony splint of the premaxilla that otherwise divides the two external nares in typical reptile skulls, giving them a single fused (confluent) opening for their nostrils. Another characteristic of azendohsaurids is that they often possess palatal teeth on the roof of their mouths similar in size and shape to those along the jaw margins, including serrations, compared to the typical tiny and conical palatal teeth of other reptiles. Such large and specialised palatal teeth are known definitively in Pamelaria, Azendohsaurus and Shringasaurus, while simpler but notably large palatal teeth with coarse serrations are found in Malerisaurus. The palatal teeth of Puercosuchus, however, are simply described as "peg-like".

All known azendohsaurids have long necks, with neck vertebrae very similar in shape and construction to those of early sauropodomorph dinosaurs, and held them raised above their shoulders. The shoulder girdles themselves are tall and very well developed, with long scapular blades. Azendohsaurids had a sprawling gait like other early archosauromorphs, although their shoulder joint faces back as well as out to the sides, suggesting they may have been able to hold their forelimbs closer to their body. Their bodies are deep, ranging from relatively narrow-bodied in Pamelaria to barrel-shaped in Azendohsaurus, and their tails are proportionally shorter and stockier compared to other archosauromorphs.

== Classification and evolution ==
Azendohsaurids are one of two or three families included in the clade Allokotosauria, a group of unusual Triassic non-archosaur archosauromorphs that also includes the families Trilophosauridae and possibly the gliding Kuehneosauridae. They have consistently been recognised as the sister taxon of trilophosaurids, initially united on shared yet differing herbivorous traits. However, as more azendohsaurids have been discovered and recognised, they demonstrate that the group was likely to be ancestrally carnivorous.

A phylogenetic analysis performed by palaeontologist Sterling J. Nesbitt and colleagues in 2021 included all recognised azendohsaurids and other allokotosaurian taxa. Their results found Pamelaria to be the earliest branching azendohsaurid, with the remaining azendohsaurids divided into two subclades, one containing the herbivores Shringasaurus and two species of Azendohsaurus, and the Malerisaurinae containing both species of Malerisaurus and similar larger material (including the material that would be named Puercosuchus). The cladogram below depicts the simplified consensus result of their analysis, where the uncertain relationships within Malerisaurinae are presented as a polytomy:

- Allokotosauria
  - Kuehneosauridae
  - - Trilophosauridae
    - Azendohsauridae
      - Pamelaria
      - - - Shringasaurus
          - - Azendohsaurus madagaskarensis
            - Azendohsaurus laaroussii
        - Malerisaurinae
          - Malerisaurus robinsonae
          - - Malerisaurus langstoni
            - Malerisaurus-like form large (Note: Representing material referred to 'Otischalkia elderae' and similar-sized material.)
            - Malerisaurus-like taxon PEFO (Note: Taxon described as Puercosuchus in 2022.)

=== Biogeography ===
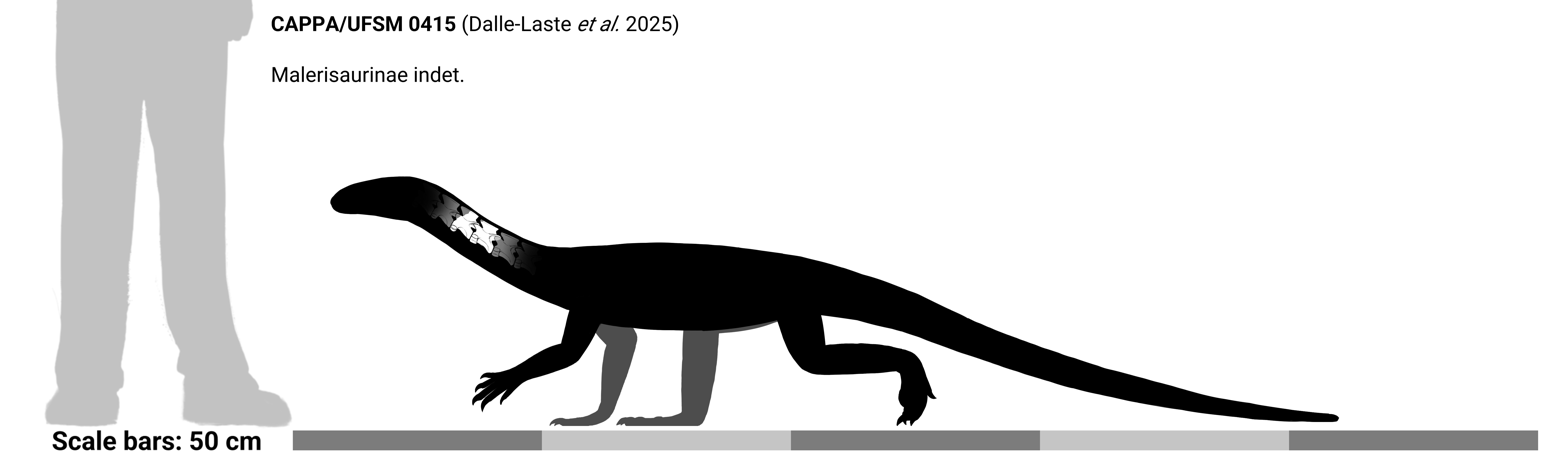
Size comparison of a Malerisaurine specimen from the Late Triassic of Brazil

The oldest known azendohsaurids are Pamelaria and Shringasaurus, both from India and dated to the Anisian stage of the Middle Triassic. Azendohsaurus itself has been dated from the end of the Middle Triassic during the Ladinian (at least for A. madagaskarensis) into the Carnian stage of the earliest Late Triassic in Morocco and Madagascar. Malerisaurines, including Malerisaurus and Puercosuchus, are exclusively known from the Late Triassic during an interval from the late Carnian into the early Norian of both North and South America as well India, and are the latest-surviving azendohsaurids known. This is in spite of their relatively plesiomorphic (i.e. ancestral) features compared to other azendohsaurids, representing a relictual lineage of early-diverging carnivorous azendohsaurids that survived longer than their more derived herbivorous kin.

Malerisaurines were previously thought to disappear from the fossil record in North America at or the near the end of the Adamanian teilzone (a local biostratigraphic unit in the southwestern United States) roughly 216 million years ago, associated with a local faunal turnover in North America. The extinction of malerisaurines in this turnover would then also have marked the extinction of azendohsaurids globally. In 2024, fossils of Puercosuchus-like malerisaurines were identified from the Kaye Quarry of Petrified Forest National Park, which has been dated to roughly 215-213 million years ago during the earliest Revueltian teilzone (immediately following the Adamanian). This then indicates that malerisaurine azendohsaurids survived and persisted beyond the faunal turnover, if only for a brief period, before the final extinction of azendohsaurids.
