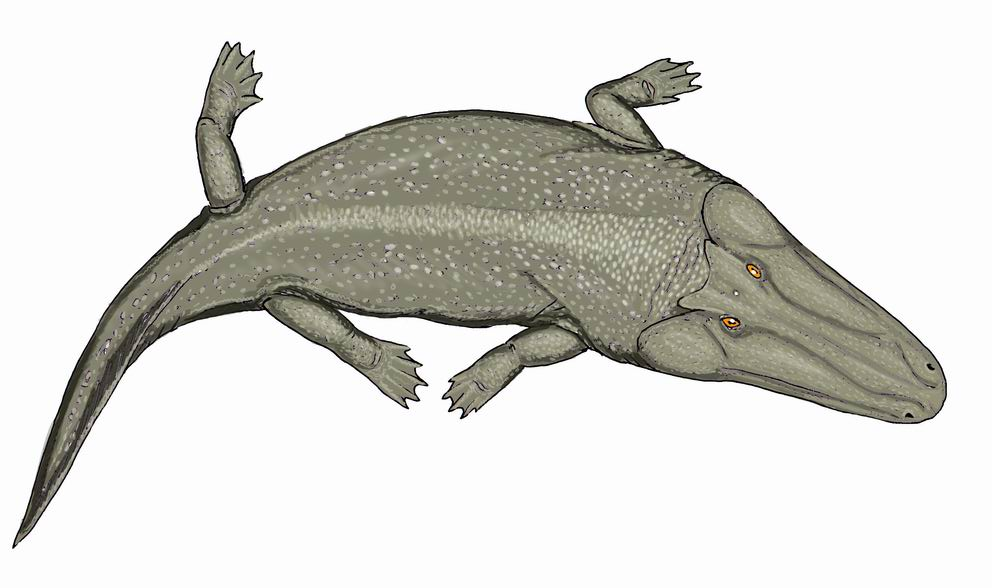
- Life restoration of Cherninia denwai

Scientific classification
- Domain: Eukaryota
- Kingdom: Animalia
- Phylum: Chordata
- Order: †Temnospondyli
- Suborder: †Stereospondyli
- Clade: †Capitosauria
- Family: †Mastodonsauridae
- Genus: †Cherninia; Damiani, 2001

Species
- †C. denwai Mukherjee & Sengupta, 1998 (type); †C. megarhina Chernin & Cosgriff, 1975

= Cherninia =

Cherninia Temporal range: Middle Triassic 247.0–242.0 Ma

Extinct genus of temnospondyls

Cherninia is an extinct genus of mastodonsaurid temnospondyl known from the Denwa Formation of India and the Ntawere Formation of Zambia.

== Discovery and species ==
The type species, Cherninia denwai, is known from the Denwa Formation. It is based on a massive skull, ISI A 54, which was originally considered a species of Parotosuchus in 1998 before being given its own genus in 2001.

Another species, Cherninia megarhina, is known from the Upper Ntawere Formation. C. megarhina is based on another large skull, BP/1/4223, which had also been previously referred to Parotosuchus. Though not as well-preserved as the skull of C. denwai, BP/1/4233 was described earlier in 1974. It was described by Sharon Chernin, a paleontologist at the Bernard Price Institute and the namesake of the genus.

== Description ==
Cherninia denwai was initially described on the basis of cranial material from the Denwa Formation. A redescription in 2024 described new material from the Denwa Formation referred to C. denwai. This new material consists of a partial skull, a mandible, clavicles, interclavicles, vertebrae, neural arches and spines, ulnae, an ilium, a femur, and a fibula, which sum up to roughly 80 individual skeletal elements.

C. denwai can be distinguished from C. megarhina, the second known species of Cherninia, by short and narrow postparietals, the presence of a septomaxilla, both anteriorly and posteriorly pointed interpterygoid vacuities, lack of parasphenoid groove, lack of occipital sensory canal, posteriorly directed and distally recurved tabular horns, the deeply concave occipital margin of the skull and the posteriorly broad otic.

C. denwai 's skull roof possessed conspicuous, paired and forked ridges anterior to the orbits. The otic notch is angular and the tabular horns are posteriorly directed and are recurved distally. The mandible is slender with a distinct post glenoid area and a well-developed, hamate process. The prearticular is separated from the splenial by the dentary and the coronoid series. The hemi-mandible is low. In labial view, the angular shows well-defined ornamentation that becomes feeble on the postsplenial. A well-developed mandibular sulcus is found in the posterior part of the hemi-mandible, and the oral sulcus extends all the way to the dentary.

== Paleoenvironment ==
The type species is known from the Middle Triassic Denwa Formation of Satpura Gondwana Basin, Central India. Mastodonsaurids are common in the Formation. The Formation comprises os heterolithic deposits encompassing sequences of sandstone and mudstone. The prevailing paleoenvironment of the Formation is a fluvio-lacustrine habitat, which would have contributed to a larger braided river system. The Denwa Formation is notable for its abundance of Triassic vertebrate fossils. Temnospondyli are common, including other mastodonsaurids such as Paracyclotosaurus crookshanki., lonchorhynchine trematosaurids and brachyopids. Ceratodus, the horned archosauromorph Shringasaurus, Rhynchosaurs and large and medium sized dicynodonts are also known.
