= Otischalkia =

Otischalkia Temporal range: Carnian

Scientific classification
- Kingdom: Animalia
- Phylum: Chordata
- Class: Reptilia
- Clade: †Allokotosauria
- Family: †Azendohsauridae
- Subfamily: †Malerisaurinae
- Genus: †Otischalkia; Hunt & Lucas, 1991

Species
- †O. elderae Hunt & Lucas, 1991 (type)

Extinct genus of reptiles

Otischalkia is an extinct genus of archosauromorph from late Triassic (late Carnian stage) deposits of Howard County, Texas, US It is known from the holotype TMM 31025-263, left humerus and from the referred specimens TMM 31025-262, TMM 31025-266, TMM 31025-264, TMM 31185-92 and TMM 31185-93. It was found in the Lower Dockum Group near the abandoned settlement of Otis Chalk. It was first named by Adrian P. Hunt and Spencer G. Lucas in 1991 and the type species is Otischalkia elderae.

Originally described as a rhynchosaur, several recent studies found O. elderae to represent a nomen dubium. Nesbitt et al. (2021) came to the conclusion that the holotype of Otischalkia actually belongs to an azendohsaurid, specifically a malerisaurine.
