= Teilzone =

In biostratigraphy, a local-range zone, topozone or teilzone (German teil = part + Greek zone) is the stratigraphic range of the rock unit between the first and last appearance datum of a particular taxon in a local area. It is a subset of the global biozone for that taxon. For the teilzone data to be meaningful, the local area must be identified. The term was coined in 1914 by German paleontologist and geologist Josef Felix Pompeckj.

== See also ==
- Biozone
- Acme zone
