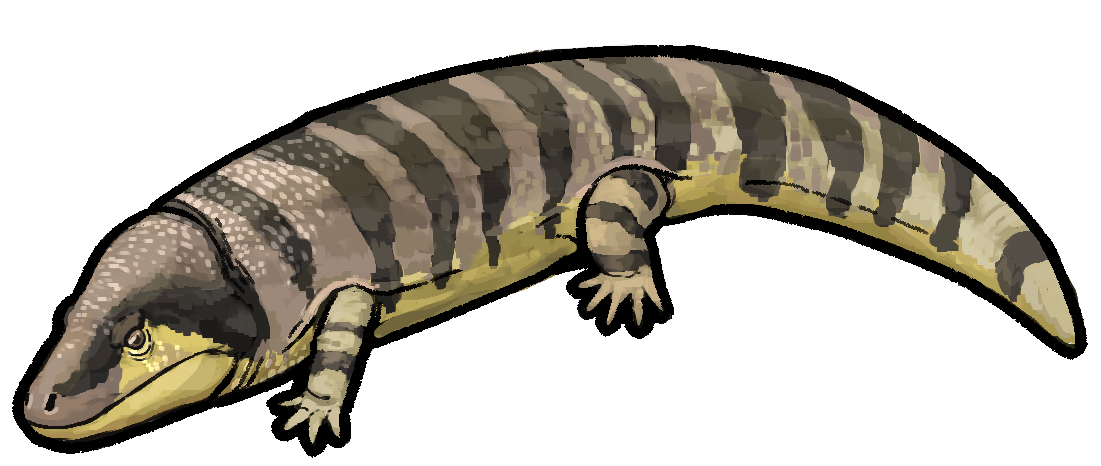
- Life restoration

Scientific classification
- Kingdom: Animalia
- Phylum: Chordata
- Clade: Tetrapoda
- Order: †Temnospondyli
- Suborder: †Stereospondyli
- Family: †incertae sedis
- Genus: †Ninumbeehan; So et al., 2024
- Species: †N. dookoodukah

Binomial name
- †Ninumbeehan dookoodukah So et al., 2024

= Ninumbeehan =

Extinct genus of temnospondyls

Ninumbeehan (from the Shoshone words ninumbee for mountain-dwelling Little People, -han as a possessive affix) is a genus of stereospondyl temnospondyl from the Late Triassic Jelm Formation of Wyoming. It is represented by the type species, Ninumbeehan dookoodukah, which was named from a holotype and three paratypes; the holotype is from the Serendipity site within the informal Serendipity beds.

== Description ==
Ninumbeehan dookoodukah is one of several small-bodied Late Triassic temnospondyls that have been named from North America, including the uncertain Latiscopus disjunctus, Rileymillerus cosgriffi, and Chinlestegophis jenkinsi. It also shares some similarities with the small-bodied Almasaurus habbazi from the Late Triassic of Morocco. There are two autapomorphies of N. dookoodukah: (1) a ventrally sloping unornamented posterior process along the midline formed by the postparietals; and (2) anterior dorsal ribs subequal in length to the dorsoventral height of the skull and mandible. It shares with C. jenkinsi and perhaps R. cosgriffi the absence of a distinct lacrimal, but lacks a lateral exposure of the palatine that is found in both of these taxa. A falciform crest of the squamosal, posteriorly situated pineal foramen, otic notch, and developed tabular horn further separate it from R. cosgriffi. The otic notch is more developed than in C. jenkinsi, the cultriform process is narrower, and the supratemporal is subrectangular, more like other stereospondyls than like the subcircular element in C. jenkinsi. The absence of a lacrimal separates it from A. habbazi, as does the expanded posterolateral region of the premaxilla along the lateral narial margin, a wider posterior region of the parietal, a flat cultriform process, and a palatoquadrate fissure.

Much of the skeleton is known for N. dookoodukah. The holotype is represented by a skull, lower jaws, and pectoral girdle in articulation, along with loosely articulated/associated left forelimb, ribs, and intercentra. Other postcrania may be present. The described paratypes also comprise skulls of varying completeness in articulation or association with the lower jaws, pectoral girdle, and axial column. The largest skull is approximately 7 cm in length, larger than C. jenkinsi and R. cosgriffi. Lateral line grooves indicate an aquatic life history, while the wedge-shaped lateral profile is thought to be evidence for inferred burrowing behavior. Like C. jenkinsi and modern caecilians, there is a second row of teeth on the coronoids that lie medial to the primary marginal row on the dentary, a feature originally proposed to link C. jenkinsi to this modern group but subsequently disputed as such a feature occurs in some other stereospondyls. The function of the greatly elongated anterior ribs of N. dookoodukah remains unclear. The limbs are relatively small compared to the skull (about one-third of the length), further suggesting that burrowing was accomplished primarily through head-based functionality.

== Discovery and naming ==
Specimens of N. dookoodukah were collected over several field seasons (2015, 2016, 2018) by field crews from the University of Wisconsin Geology Museum (UWGM). Many of the specimen occur entirely within burrows interpreted as having been used for estivation that are distributed across three sites: DoJo, Independence, and the type locality, Serendipity. Several dozen have been collected, most of which contain some skeletal material. The burrows are predominantly sub-vertical to vertical with a diameter correspondent with the skull width of the encapsulated animal. They are predominantly contained within the host fluvial sandstone that comprises the Serendipity beds, within the upper 10 m of the Jelm Formation, but some penetration into the underlying mudstone is observed. Not all burrows contain skeletal material, and the articulation of remains is variable between burrows. As some spatially adjacent burrows cross-cut one another, it is thought that there were repeated episodes of excavation and thus that the assemblages represent time-averaging rather than a singular event.

The taxon was named by researchers from the University of Wisconsin-Madison, George Washington University, University of Exeter, the Field Museum of Natural History, the Australian Nuclear Science and Technology Organisation, and a local school system (Fort Washakie Schools) and preservation office (Eastern Shoshone Tribal Historic Preservation Office). The species epithet, dookoodukah, is derived from the Shoshone words dookoo for flesh and dukah for eater, giving a full etymological meaning of 'Little People's flesh eater', honouring the Little People and referencing the sharp teeth of the fossil.

== Paleoecology ==
While temnospondyls have been previously discovered in burrows, N. dookoodukah is proposed to represent the first definitive instance of a temnospondyl with demonstrated capacity for constructing a burrow, rather than being a potential opportunistic reuser. The authors proposed that this largely aquatic taxon would have burrowed into point bar deposits in the river channel during dry periods, potentially over many seasons to years. As the near-equatorial regions of Pangea were subjected to a megamonsoon system, pronounced seasonality likely typified the paleoenvironment, with estivation as one adaptive strategy, similar to many modern amphibians that utilize burrowing in monsoonal climates. The exact age of the Jelm Formation remains unresolved, but the overlying Popo Agie Formation has been dated to the mid-late Carnian (231-227 Ma), so the Serendipity beds may have been deposited prior to the Carnian Pluvial Episode. The presence of abundant temnospondyl remains suggests, contrary to previous hypotheses, that the paucity of vertebrate fossils in the Carnian of North America may be related to sampling and not to a harsh environment leading to scarcity. The authors also suggest that estivation, either in directly constructed burrows or repurposed burrows, may have been more widespread and potentially explain temnospondyls' survival across the end-Permian mass extinction and subsequent radiation into Triassic habitats across the globe.
