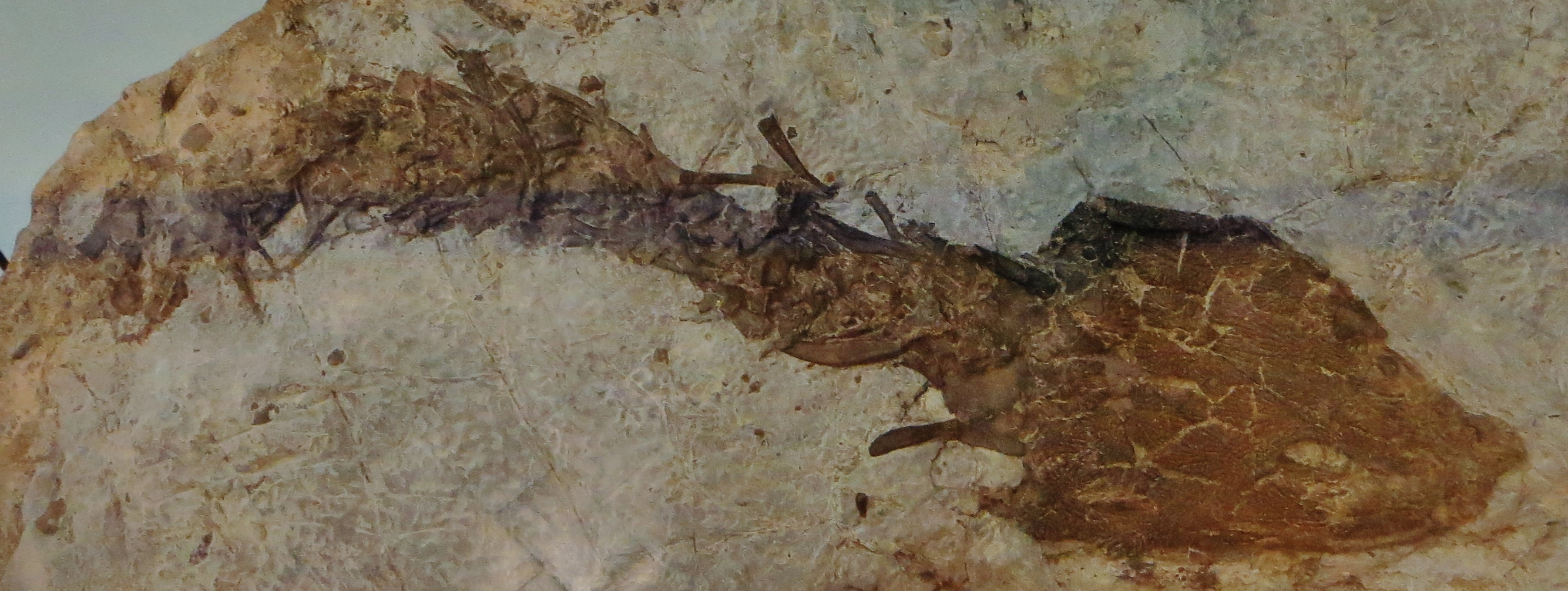
- Fossil

Scientific classification
- Kingdom: Animalia
- Phylum: Chordata
- Clade: Tetrapoda
- Order: †Temnospondyli
- Suborder: †Stereospondyli
- Superfamily: †Metoposauroidea
- Genus: †Callistomordax; Schoch, 2008

Type species
- †Callistomordax kugleri Schoch, 2008

= Callistomordax =

Callistomordax Temporal range: Middle Triassic, Ladinian

Extinct genus of amphibians

Callistomordax is an extinct genus of temnospondyl amphibian from the Middle Triassic of Germany. The type and only species, Callistomordax kugleri, was named in 2008. It is known from several well-preserved skeletons found in the Erfurt Formation, part of the Lower Keuper, which dates back to the late Ladinian stage.

== History of study and provenance ==
The first specimen of Callistomordax kugleri, which is currently reposited at the Staatliches Museum für Naturkunde (SMNS) in Stuttgart, Germany, was collected from the Middle Triassic (Upper Ladinian-aged) Erfurt Formation of Baden-Württemberg by Werner Kugler, for whom the species is named. Various authors speculated on the taxonomic affinities of the specimen, but it was not formally resolved until 2008. The specimen was subsequently donated to the SMNS and additional excavation at the original locality in 2000 led to the discovery of two nearly complete skeletons by private collectors Hans Michael Salomon and Traugott Haubold.

== Anatomy ==
Callistomordax was distinguished from other temnospondyls by characters such as a single co-ossified frontal (normally paired in tetrapods), a pterygoid with both a broad and flat quadrate ramus and a slender and narrow palatine ramus, and lateral compression of the palatal and symphyseal fangs. It shares a number of metoposaurid synapomorphies such as deeply sloping postparietals and tabulars but also retains more primitive features found in earlier diverging temnospondyls and a number of probable homoplasies.

== Ecology ==
As with many Triassic temnospondyls, Callistomordax is considered to have been an aquatic freshwater tetrapod, evidenced by both its anatomy (e.g., lateral line system) and its depositional environment. The Lower Keuper Basin where Callistomordax was found was subjected to repeated transgression-regression cycles, resulting in mixed deposits of freshwater and marine taxa. Callistomordax is relatively rare and consists only of isolated elements in bonebeds with higher abundances of marine taxa, and the most complete specimens are found with various invertebrates and fish that suggest a relatively low salinity environment.

== Phylogeny ==
Below is a cladogram from Schoch (2008):

- Stereospondyli
  - Rhinesuchidae
  - - Lydekkerina
    - - - Rhytidosteidae
        - - Brachyopoidea
            - Siderops
            - Batrachosuchus
          - - Laidleria
            - Plagiosauroidea
              - Gerrothorax
              - Plagiosaurus
      - - Capitosauroidea
        - Trematosauria
          - - Aphaneramma
            - Trematolestes
          - - Lyrocephaliscus
            - Rileymillerus
            - - Almasaurus
              - - Callistomordax
                - Metoposauridae

Callistomordax is significant in filling a gap in the fossil record that inhibited firm conclusions regarding the origins of the Metoposauridae, which had previously been variably suggested to be placed in the Permian Dvinosauria or within the Triassic Trematosauria. As seen in the above phylogeny, Callistomordax is the sister taxon to the Metoposauridae and places the Metoposauroidea (Metoposauridae + Callistomordax) within Trematosauria.
