= Latiscopidae =

Latiscopidae Temporal range: Triassic

Scientific classification
- Domain: Eukaryota
- Kingdom: Animalia
- Phylum: Chordata
- Order: †Temnospondyli
- Suborder: †Stereospondyli
- Superfamily: †Metoposauroidea
- Family: †Latiscopidae

Genera
- Almasaurus; Chinlestegophis; Ninumbeehan; Rileymillerus; Latiscopus (nomen dubium)

Extinct family of temnospondyls

Latiscopidae is an extinct family of Triassic temnospondyls. It was first described in 1940 based on a fossil skull found in Texas. It includes small sized temnospondyls that are thought to have engaged in burrowing and seasonal aestivation. Members of the group had wedge shaped skulls that are thought to have assisted in burrowing.
