= Rileymillerus =

Rileymillerus Temporal range: Late Triassic, 223–200 Ma

Scientific classification
- Domain: Eukaryota
- Kingdom: Animalia
- Phylum: Chordata
- Order: †Temnospondyli
- Suborder: †Stereospondyli
- Superfamily: †Metoposauroidea
- Genus: †Rileymillerus; Bolt and Chatterjee, 2000

Type species
- †Rileymillerus cosgriffi Bolt and Chatterjee, 2000

Extinct genus of amphibians

Rileymillerus is an extinct genus of temnospondyl amphibian from the Late Triassic Post Quarry in the Dockum Group of Texas that was described by John Bolt and Sankar Chatterjee in 2000. The holotype, a nearly complete skull with articulated jaws, is housed at the Museum of Texas Tech University. The genus is named for Riley Miller, who allowed Chatterjee to work on the Post Quarry, and the species is named for the paleontologist John Cosgriff.

== Description ==
Rileymillerus cosgriffi most closely resembles the poorly-known Latiscopus disjunctus that was described from similarly aged deposits of the Dockum Group near Otis Chalk, Texas. As was noted by Wilson (1948) and Bolt & Chatterjee (2000), both of these taxa differ substantially from the morphology seen in large, flat-skulled aquatic temnospondyls of the Late Triassic (metoposaurids in North America). Examples of their more unusual anatomy (most of which are confidently known only in R. cosgriffi) include the absence of a lacrimal bone, the presence of a lateral exposure of the palatine bone, a tall skull with laterally facing orbits, and an anteromedial inflection of the palatal ramus of the pterygoid. Both are also exceptionally small for Triassic temnospondyls, with skull lengths estimated around 3.5 cm (compared to those of metoposaurids, which exceeded 50 cm), and appear to have been relatively terrestrial (evidenced by an absence of lateral line grooves found in aquatic temnospondyls). Other than the holotype skull, only a few small, isolated, potentially diplospondylous intercentra were referred to R. cosgriffi.

== Classification ==
The phylogenetic relationships of Rileymillerus have historically been unresolved. Bolt & Chatterjee (2000) immediately recognized the similarities with Latiscopus, which was placed in a monogeneric family, the Latiscopidae, but which remains poorly-resolved (and considered as a nomen dubium by Bolt & Chatterjee). Affinities with the similarly enigmatic Almasaurus habbazi from the Late Triassic of Morocco were considered but ultimately considered to be largely superficial similarities related to their shared small size; various other differences between the taxa exist. Bolt & Chatterjee considered close affinities with brachyopoids to be the most probable at the time, but they did not conclusively place Rileymillerus within the clade and did not perform a phylogenetic analysis to test this hypothesis, thus designating it as Temnospondyli incertae sedis. Subsequent analysis of Rileymillerus within a phylogenetic analysis recovered it as being close to both Almasaurus and to metoposaurids (see below). This interpretation has been predicated on the interpretation of the small bone at the anteroventral margin of the orbit. Bolt & Chatterjee (2000) identified it as a lateral exposure of the palatine, a feature typically seen in Paleozoic and not Mesozoic temnospondyls, which resulted in the interpretation of an absent lacrimal, a rare condition best seen in rhytidosteids and brachyopoids. Conversely, Schoch (2008) interpreted this bone as a lacrimal in a restricted position similar to that of Almasaurus and metoposaurids. Most recently, Rileymillerus has been shown to be closely related to brachyopoids and plagiosauroids and to Chinlestegophis jenkinsi, a similarly small Late Triassic temnospondyl interpreted as a stem caecilian.

== Phylogeny ==
Below is a cladogram from Schoch (2008):

- Stereospondyli
  - Rhinesuchidae
  - - Lydekkerina
    - - - Rhytidosteidae
        - - Brachyopoidea
            - Siderops
            - Batrachosuchus
          - - Laidleria
            - Plagiosauroidea
              - Gerrothorax
              - Plagiosaurus
      - - Capitosauroidea
        - Trematosauria
          - - Aphaneramma
            - Trematolestes
          - - Lyrocephaliscus
            - Rileymillerus
            - - Almasaurus
              - - Callistomordax
                - Metoposauridae

The results of the phylogenetic analysis of Pardo et al. (2017):

- Stereospondyli
  - Rhinesuchidae
  - - Lydekkerina
    - - - Capitosauria
        - - - Trematosauria
            - Metoposauroidea
          - - Chigutisauridae
            - - - Brachyopoidea
                - Plagiosauroidea
              - - Rileymillerus
                - - Chinlestegophis
                  - caecilians
