= Latiscopus =

Latiscopus Temporal range: Late Triassic

Scientific classification
- Kingdom: Animalia
- Phylum: Chordata
- Clade: Tetrapoda
- Order: †Temnospondyli
- Suborder: †Stereospondyli
- Family: †Latiscopidae
- Genus: †Latiscopus; Wilson, 1948

Type species
- †Latiscopus disjunctus Wilson, 1948

Extinct genus of amphibians

Latiscopus disjunctus is a small Late Triassic temnospondyl collected in 1940 by a Works Projects Administration crew working near Otis Chalk, Texas that was described by John Wilson in 1948.

== Description ==
The holotype and only known specimen consists of a largely complete skull that was unfortunately overprepared, removing many of the surficial details; the specimen is reposited at the Texas Vertebrate Paleontology Collections, Jackson School Museum of Earth History, The University of Texas at Austin. Wilson provided a short description of features that he could observe, remarking on its distinction from the much larger, aquatic temnospondyls found in the Late Triassic and referred the taxon to a new family, the Latiscopidae. He placed this family within the Stereospondyli based on a few aspects of the palate and the absence of rhachitomous temnospondyls in the Dockum Group. He considered it somewhat similar to the Trematosauridae based on the relatively long and narrow skull but remarked that Latiscopus was probably not aquatic based on the laterally facing orbits. Subsequent authors proposed various affinities, including to rhytidosteids, with Almasaurus habbazi, another small temnospondyl from the Late Triassic of disputed phylogenetic affinities, and to trematosaurs. Because of its poor condition, Latiscopus has never been analyzed in a phylogenetic analysis, but Almasaurus, which is sometimes placed within the Latiscopidae, is typically recovered as a trematosaur.

Latiscopus was re-examined as part of the description of the morphologically similar Rileymillerus from the Late Triassic of Texas. Bolt & Chatterjee amended many of the statements made by Wilson, frequently noting that claims about the anatomy could not be verified or were erroneous. They concluded that the specimen was too poorly preserved in its current state to be properly comparable to other temnospondyls and designated it as a nomen dubium.
