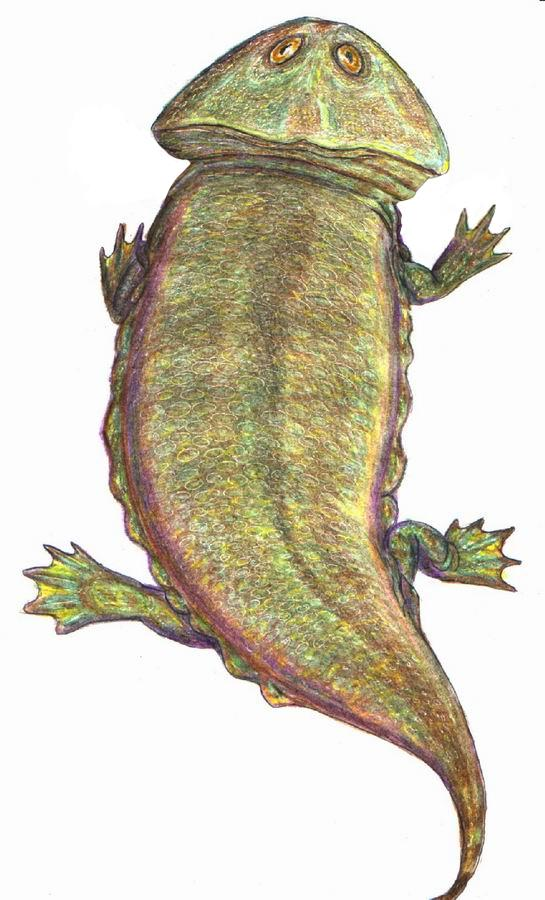
- Life restoration of Plagiosaurus

Scientific classification
- Kingdom: Animalia
- Phylum: Chordata
- Clade: Tetrapoda
- Order: †Temnospondyli
- Suborder: †Stereospondyli
- Clade: †Trematosauria
- Superfamily: †Plagiosauroidea; Abel, 1919

= Plagiosauroidea =

Plagiosauroidea Temporal range: Early - Late Triassic 252.3–201.3 Ma

Extinct superfamily of amphibians

Plagiosauroidea is a superfamily of stereospondyl temnospondyls that lived in the Triassic period.

This clade was defined as Laidleria + Plagiosauridae by Yates and Warren (2000).
