= Chinlestegophis =

Chinlestegophis Temporal range: Late Triassic, 221–206 Ma

Scientific classification
- Kingdom: Animalia
- Phylum: Chordata
- Order: †Temnospondyli
- Suborder: †Stereospondyli
- Superfamily: †Metoposauroidea?
- Genus: †Chinlestegophis Pardo et al., 2017

Binomial name
- †Chinlestegophis jenkinsi Pardo et al., 2017

Extinct genus of amphibians

Chinlestegophis is a diminutive Late Triassic stereospondyl that has been interpreted as a putative stem caecilian, a living group of legless burrowing amphibians. If Chinlestegophis is indeed both an advanced stereospondyl and a relative of caecilians, this means that stereospondyls (in the form of caecilians) survived to the present day; historically the group was thought to have gone extinct by the early Cretaceous. Chinlestegophis jenkinsi, the type and only species, is known from two partial skulls discovered in the Chinle Formation in Colorado.

== History of study ==
Chinlestegophis was described in 2017 by Jason Pardo, Adam Huttenlocker, and Bryan Small based on two specimens collected in the late 1990s by Small. The genus name is derived from the name of the formation (Chinle), the Greek root stego- ('roof' or 'cover'), and the Greek root -ophis ('serpent'). The species name honors Farish Jenkins, the longtime curator of the Museum of Comparative Zoology at Harvard University who described Eocaecilia, the oldest known caecilian. The taxon is readily diagnosed by numerous features given its distinctive small size and consequent diverging morphology from many contemporaneous stereospondyls; Pardo et al. noted numerous features shared between Chinlestegophis and brachyopoids (e.g., lacrimal-maxilla fusion), Rileymillerus (e.g., lateral exposure of the palate), and caecilians (e.g., double tooth row on the lower jaw).

== Relationships ==
The phylogenetic positions of many small-bodied temnospondyls have often been controversial, including that of the closely related Rileymillerus cosgriffi from the Late Triassic of Texas. The analysis by Pardo et al. (2017) used a modified matrix from Schoch (2013), which looked at the relationships of all temnospondyls. In addition to recovering Chinlestegophis as the sister taxon to Rileymillerus, the authors also recovered these taxa as the closest relatives of brachyopoids, another clade of stereospondyl that were the last non-lissamphibian temnospondyls to survive in the Mesozoic. In turn, the analysis recovered Chinlestegophis as the closest relative to Eocaecilia, the oldest known caecilian. As such, these results form the basis for a fourth major hypothesis regarding lissamphibian origins, namely that all lissamphibians are derived from temnospondyls, but that batrachians (frogs and salamanders) are descended from dissorophoids, whereas caecilians came from Chinlestegophis-like taxa nested among the stereospondyls.

Other workers have disputed the interpretation of Chinlestegophis as a stem caecilian on various grounds. For example, Marjanović & Laurin (2019) note that the original study reported only a Bayesian consensus and a majority-rule consensus tree of the main data matrix, and while both support the claimed caecilian affinities of Chinlestegophis jenkinsi, the strict parsimony consensus tree does not, given that it is compatible with lissamphibian monophyly (indeed, this topology is found in some of the most parsimonious trees); those workers generally favor and recover support for a monophyletic origin of lissamphibians from lepospondyls. Criticism of the use of the majority-rule consensus has also been published by Serra Silva & Wilkinson (2021). The use of a modified version of the Pardo et al. matrix by Daza et al. (2020) and Schoch et al. (2020) recovered a single origin of all lissamphibians from dissorophoids, consistent with the historic "temnospondyl hypothesis"; further analysis in the description of the unequivocal Late Triassic gymnophionomorph Funcusvermis gilmorei also recovered the traditional "temnospondyl hypothesis." The characters that have been used to support gymnophionan affinities of Chinlestegophis have also been criticized. No other studies to date have independently supported the hypothesis of relationships proposed by Pardo et al.
