= Almasaurus =

Almasaurus Temporal range: Late Triassic

Scientific classification
- Kingdom: Animalia
- Phylum: Chordata
- Clade: Tetrapoda
- Order: †Temnospondyli
- Suborder: †Stereospondyli
- Family: †Latiscopidae
- Genus: †Almasaurus; Dutuit, 1972

Type species
- †A. habbazi Dutuit, 1972

Extinct genus of amphibians

Almasaurus is an extinct genus of trematosaurian temnospondyl within the family Latiscopidae. It is known from several skulls and some postcranial material found from the Argana Formation in Morocco, which dates back to the Late Triassic.

When it was first named in 1972, Almasaurus was placed within its own superfamily, the Almasauroidea. Although the related latiscopid Latiscopus disjunctus possesses exoccipitals (the bones at the rear base of the skull) that are underplated (a feature that suggests that it is a member of the family Trematosauridae) Almasaurus is not considered to be a trematosaurid because it lacks such underplating. Almasaurus was considered to be a capitosaurian by Warren & Black (1985) because it shared several characters with the group, including a deeply notched squamosal (platelike part of the temporal bone) and a lacrimal flexure (curve in tear drainage canal), while supposedly exhibiting none of the characters associated with trematosaurians. However, more recent studies have concluded that Almasaurus is either a temnospondyl more basal than the clade formed from the dichotomy between Capitosauria and Trematosauria or that the genus is closely related to the trematosaurian family Metoposauridae, perhaps being a sister taxon of it.

A temnospondyl genus described in 2000, Rileymillerus, is thought to be closely related to Almasaurus.

Below is a cladogram showing the phylogenetic position of Almasaurus, from Schoch (2008):

- - Capitosauroidea
  - Trematosauria
    - unnamed
      - Aphaneramma
      - Trematolestes
    - unnamed
      - Lyrocephaliscus
      - Rileymillerus
      - unnamed
        - Almasaurus
        - unnamed
          - Metoposauridae
          - Callistomordax

== See also ==
- Prehistoric amphibian
- List of prehistoric amphibians
