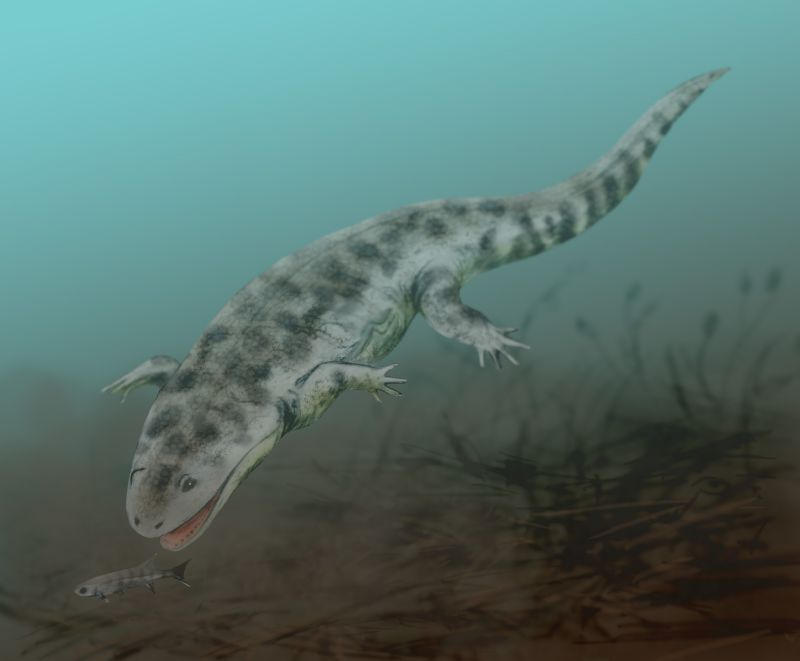
- Life restoration of Anaschisma browni

Scientific classification
- Domain: Eukaryota
- Kingdom: Animalia
- Phylum: Chordata
- Order: †Temnospondyli
- Suborder: †Stereospondyli
- Clade: †Trematosauria
- Superfamily: †Metoposauroidea; Watson, 1919

Subgroups
- †Callistomordax; †Rileymillerus?; †Latiscopidae; †Metoposauridae

= Metoposauroidea =

Metoposauroids Temporal range: Triassic, 237–208 Ma

Extinct superfamily of temnospondyls

Metoposauroidea is an extinct superfamily of temnospondyls that lived from the Middle to Upper Triassic in North America, Europe and North Africa. Metoposauroidea includes the families Metoposauridae and Latiscopidae.
