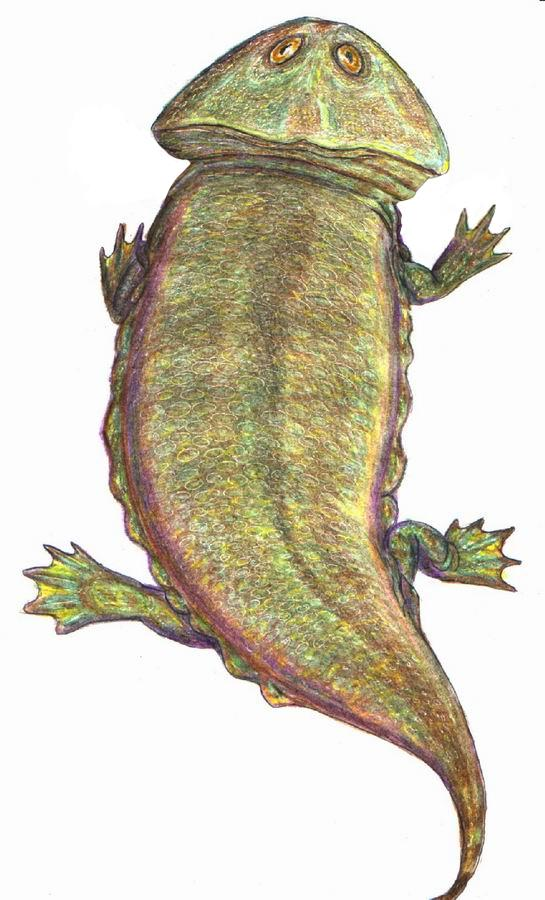

Scientific classification
- Domain: Eukaryota
- Kingdom: Animalia
- Phylum: Chordata
- Order: †Temnospondyli
- Suborder: †Stereospondyli
- Family: †Plagiosauridae
- Genus: †Plagiosaurus; Jaekel, 1914

Type species
- †Plagiosaurus depressus Jaekel, 1914

= Plagiosaurus =

Plagiosaurus Temporal range: Triassic

Extinct genus of amphibians

Plagiosaurus is an extinct genus of temnospondyl amphibian. The type and only species is P. depressus, first described by Otto Jaekel in 1914. Arthur Smith Woodward regarded the genus as a synonym of Plagiosternum, but most researchers consider it to be valid. It was paedomorphic, retaining the larval gills in adulthood. Like many stereospondyls, it had weak simplified vertebrae, consisting of large intercentra and neural arches, which is known as the stereospondylous condition.
